= List of war poets =

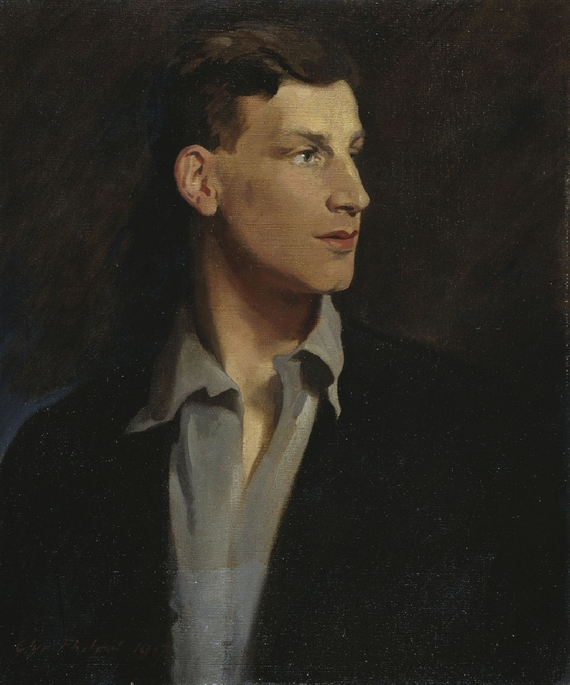
Siegfried Sassoon, a British war poet famous for his poetry written during the First World War.

This is a partial list of authors known to have composed war poetry.

== Pre-1500 ==
- King David, traditionally credited with Biblical poetry in the Book of Psalms
- Homer: The Iliad
- Quintus of Smyrna: Posthomerica
- Ferdowsi: Shahnameh
- Aneirin: Y Gododdin
- John Barbour: The Brus
- Blind Harry: The Wallace

== 1500–1800 ==
- Jean Elliot: The Flowers of the Forest
- Mícheál Ó Cléirigh: Cogad Gáedel re Gallaib
- Brne Karnarutić: Vazetje Sigeta grada
- Miklós Zrínyi: Szigeti veszedelem
- Pavao Ritter Vitezović: Odiljenje sigetsko
- Andreas Gryphius
- Sìleas na Ceapaich: Là Sliabh an t-Siorraim, Alistair à Gleanna Garadh
- Alasdair Mac Mhaighstir Alasdair
- John Roy Stewart
- Seán "Clárach" Mac Domhnaill: Mo Ghile Mear
- Walter Scott
- Carolina Nairne
- Agnes Maxwell MacLeod
- Allan Cunningham
- William Hamilton
- Henry Wadsworth Longfellow: Paul Revere's Ride
- Ralph Waldo Emerson: Concord Hymn
- David Humphreys
- Iain mac Mhurchaidh
- Cionneach MacCionnich

== 1800–1914 ==
- Haxhi Shehreti: Alipashiad
- Lord Byron
- Rigas Feraios
- Dionysios Solomos
- Georg Herwegh
- Sándor Petőfi
- Alfred, Lord Tennyson: "The Charge of the Light Brigade"
- Walt Whitman: "Beat! Beat! Drums!"
- Herman Melville
- Awenydd
- Abram Ryan
- Rudyard Kipling: "Lichtenberg"
- Thomas Hardy
- Hristo Botev: "My Prayer", "Hadzhi Dimitar", "At Farewell"

== First World War ==
- John Allan Wyeth
- Wilfred Owen
- Robert Graves
- Siegfried Sassoon
- David Jones
- Ivor Gurney
- Rupert Brooke
- Edward Thomas
- Isaac Rosenberg
- Charles Peguy
- Guillaume Apollinaire
- Blaise Cendrars
- Eugenio Montale
- Giuseppe Ungaretti
- Gabriele D'Annunzio
- Georg Trakl
- August Stramm
- Gottfried Benn
- Géza Gyóni
- August Stramm
- Walter Flex: Wildgänse rauschen durch die Nacht
- Yvan Goll: Requiem. Für die Gefallenen von Europa
- Stefan George
- Reinhard Sorge
- Anton Schnack
- Guillaume Apollinaire
- Adrien Bertrand
- Yvan Goll
- Charles Péguy
- Blaise Cendrars
- Jean de La Ville de Mirmont
- Yann-Ber Kalloc'h
- Alexander Blok
- Ilya Ehrenburg
- Nikolay Semenovich Tikhonov
- Nikolay Gumilyov
- Anna Akhmatova
- Leon Gellert
- John O'Donnell
- John McCrae: In Flanders Fields
- Robert W. Service: Rhymes of a Red-Cross Man
- William Butler Yeats: "On being asked for a War Poem"
- Allan MacDonald
- Tom Kettle
- Charles Sorley
- John Munro
- Pàdraig Moireasdan
- Dòmhnall Ruadh Chorùna
- Hedd Wyn
- Cynan
- Alan Seeger
- Joyce Kilmer: "Rouge Bouquet"
- Moina Michael: We Shall Keep the Faith

== Interwar period ==
- Roy Campbell
- Uys Krige
- Federico García Lorca
- José María Hinojosa Lasarte
- Antonio Machado
- Manuel Machado

== Second World War ==
- Czesław Miłosz
- Hirsh Glick
- Anna Świrszczyńska
- Miklós Radnóti
- Anna Akhmatova
- Alexander Solzhenitsyn
- Desanka Maksimović
- Yrjö Jylhä
- John Gillespie Magee Jr.
- Alun Lewis
- Keith Douglas
- Sidney Keyes
- Eoghan Ó Tuairisc
- H. W. Gretton
- Hamish Henderson
- Duncan Livingstone
- Sorley MacLean
- Dòmhnall Ruadh Chorùna
- Aonghas Caimbeul
- Calum MacNeacail
- Dylan Thomas
- Alun Lewis
- Richard Wilbur
- Anthony Hecht
- Dunstan Thompson
- Karl Shapiro
- Randall Jarrell
- Paul Celan: "Todesfuge"
- Tristan Tzara
- Ryuichi Tamura
- Sadako Kurihara
- Tadamichi Kuribayashi

== Korean War and later ==
- Rolando Hinojosa
- William Wantling
- Dòmhnall Ruadh Chorùna
- Michael Casey
- W. D. Ehrhart
- Richard Wilbur
- Rob Jacques
- Yusef Komunyakaa
- Bruce Weigl
- Caitlín Maude
- Brian Turner
- Erika Renee Land
