= Scottish Gaelic literature =

Scottish Gaelic literature refers to literary works composed in the Scottish Gaelic language, which is, like Irish and Manx, a member of the Goidelic branch of Celtic languages. Gaelic literature was also composed in Gàidhealtachd communities throughout the global Scottish diaspora where the language has been and is still spoken.

== Middle Ages ==
=== Early Middle Ages ===
In early Middle Ages what is now Scotland was culturally and politically divided. In the West were the Gaels of Dál Riata, who had close links with the clan system of Gaelic Ireland, from whence they had migrated and brought with them the name of Scots. Very few works of Gaelic poetry survive from the early medieval period, and most of these are in Irish manuscripts. There are works of Christian poetry that can be identified as Scottish, including the Elegy for St Columba by Dallán Forgaill (c. 597) and "In Praise of St Columba" by Beccan mac Luigdech of Rùm, c. 677. A series of anecdotes contained in the tenth century Betha Adamnáin (Life of St. Adomnán) are probably derived from works composed on Iona. Outside of these, there are works of Irish bardic poetry in praise of the Pictish kings preserved within Irish annals, that were almost certainly composed in Scotland.

Beginning in the later eighth century, Viking raids and invasions may have forced a merger of the Gaelic and Pictish crowns. The Kingdom of Alba emerged, which would eventually become known as the Kingdom of Scotland, and traced its origin to Cínaed mac Ailpín (Kenneth MacAlpin) in the 840s through the House of Alpin. The Kingdom of Alba was overwhelmingly an oral society dominated by Gaelic culture. Fuller sources for Ireland of the same period suggest that there would have been filidh, who acted as poets, musicians and historians, often attached to the court of a lord or king, and passed on their knowledge and culture in Gaelic to the next generation.

=== High Middle Ages ===
At least from the accession of David I (r. 1124–53), as part of a Davidian Revolution that introduced French culture and political systems, Gaelic ceased to be the main language of the royal court and was probably replaced by French. After this "de-gallicisation" of the Scottish court, a less highly regarded order of bards took over the functions of the filidh, and they would continue to act in a similar role in the Highlands and Islands into the eighteenth century. They often trained in bardic schools. A few of these, like the one run by the MacMhuirich dynasty, who were bards to the Lord of the Isles, continued until they were suppressed from the seventeenth century. Members of bardic schools were trained in the strict metres, rooted in Irish bardic poetry. Much of their work was never written down, and what survives was only recorded from the sixteenth century. It is possible that more Middle Irish literature was written in Medieval Scotland than is often thought, but has not survived because the Gaelic literary establishment of eastern Scotland died out before the fourteenth century. Thomas Owen Clancy has argued that the Lebor Bretnach, the so-called "Irish Nennius", was written in Scotland, and probably at the monastery in Abernethy, but this text survives only from manuscripts preserved in Ireland. Other literary works that have survived include that of the prolific poet Gille Brighde Albanach. His Heading for Damietta (c. 1218) dealt with his experiences of the Fifth Crusade.

== Renaissance and Reformation ==
In the late Middle Ages, Middle Scots, often simply called English, became the dominant language of the country. It was derived largely from Old English, with the addition of elements from Gaelic and Norman French. Although resembling the language spoken in northern England, it became a distinct dialect from the late fourteenth century onwards. As the ruling elite gradually abandoned Norman French, they began to adopt Middle Scots, and by the fifteenth century it was the language of government, with acts of parliament, council records and treasurer's accounts almost all using it from the reign of James I (1406–37) onwards. As a result, Gaelic, once dominant north of the Tay, began a steady decline. Lowland writers began to treat Gaelic as a second class, rustic and even amusing language, helping to frame attitudes towards the highlands and to create a cultural gulf with the lowlands. The major corpus of Medieval Scottish Gaelic poetry, The Book of the Dean of Lismore was compiled by the brothers James and Donald MacGregor in Glenlyon during the early decades of the sixteenth century. Beside Scottish Gaelic verse it contains a large number of poems composed in Ireland as well as verse and prose in Scots and Latin. The subject matter includes love poetry, heroic ballads and philosophical pieces. It also is notable for containing poetry by at least four women. These include Aithbhreac Inghean Coirceadal (f. 1460), who after being widowed composed a lament addressed to the rosary of her late husband, a Tacksman of Clan MacNeil and the constable of Castle Sween.

The same book also includes three poems by Iseabail Ní Mheic Cailéin, the daughter of Colin Campbell, Earl of Argyll and Chief of Clan Campbell (died 1493). Iseabail married William Drummond, Chief of Clan Drummond. She became the grandmother of David Drummond, 2nd Lord Drummond of Cargill and is the ancestor of all subsequent Earls of Perth.

By far the most famous of Iseabail's three poems is Éistibh, a Luchd an Tighe-se, which Thomas Owen Clancy has described as, "a fairly obscene boast to the court circle on the size and potency of her household priest's penis. The authenticity of the attribution to Iseabail has been questioned, but without substantial grounds."

In a 2017 article about Scottish Gaelic erotic literature, Peter Mackay suggested that Iseabail may have been following the established tradition in Scottish Renaissance literature of exposing, mocking, and criticizing the sexual sins of priests and consecrated religious. Mackay conceded, however, that Iseabail's poem could just as easily be an unashamed celebration of female promiscuity and lust.

The poet Walter Kennedy (d. 1518?), who was one of the Makars at the court of James IV, was a native speaker of Galwegian Gaelic and was the younger brother of a Tacksman of Clan Kennedy, based in Galloway, South Ayrshire.

William Dunbar in The Flyting of Dunbar and Kennedie characterises Kennedy as one "of the Irishry" who speaks a barbarous Highland dialect, as physically hideous and withered like a sort of living memento mori, as poor and hungry, and of committing bestiality with mares. Kennedy, by contrast, tells Dunbar to go over to England if he wants to speak English, suggests that Dunbar was descended from Beelzebub, is a dwarf, and has no control of his bowel movements (to the point of almost sinking a ship on which he was travelling).

While Kennedy may well have also written poems in his native Galwegian Gaelic, his poetry in Middle Scots is all that now survives.

During the Scottish Reformation, the Book of Common Order was translated into Gaelic by Séon Caramel, Bishop of the Isles, and released via the printing press in 1567. This is considered the first printed book in Scottish Gaelic though the language heavily resembles Classical Irish.

== Seventeenth-century ==
By the early modern era Gaelic had been in geographical decline for three centuries and had begun to be a minority language, which was increasingly confined to the Highlands and Islands. The traditions and educational roots of Classical Gaelic rooted in Irish bardic poetry survived much longer in Scotland than in Ireland, with the last fully competent member of the MacMhuirich dynasty, who were hereditary poets to the Lords of the Isles and then the Captains of Clanranald, still working in the early eighteenth century.

In Gaelic Ireland, Irish language bards were trained at special bardic schools based on the principle of memorization. Bards were expected, even after the bardic school system was replaced by hedge schools, to compose their verses lying down and in the dark, "to avoid the distraction which light and the variety of objects represented commonly occasions" and to concentrate solely, "upon the subject at hand and the theme given". In the Scottish Highlands and Islands, where Irish-inspired bardic schools survived until well into the 18th-century, Martin Martin described Gaelic poetry composition practices as almost identical, "They shut their doors and windows for a day's time, and upon their backs with a stone upon their belly, and [their] Plaids about their heads, and their eyes being cover'd they pump their brains for rhetorical encomium or panegyric; and indeed they furnish such a style from this dark cell as is understood by very few; and indeed if they purchase a couple of horses as the reward of their meditation, they think they have done a great matter."

Nevertheless, interest in the sponsorship of panegyric Gaelic poetry was declining among the clan leaders. Gaelic was gradually being overtaken by Middle Scots, which became the language of both the Scottish nobility and the majority population. Middle Scots was derived substantially from Old English, with Gaelic and French influences. It was usually called Inglyshe and was very close to the language spoken in northern England, Unlike many of his predecessors, James VI actively despised Gaelic culture. As the tradition of Classical poetry declined, a new tradition of vernacular Scottish Gaelic poetry began to emerge. While Classical Gaelic poetry had used a literary language largely fixed in the twelfth century while still being widely understood on both sides of the Irish Sea, the vernacular in both Ireland and Scotland had long since diverged from it, often radically. In further contrast to the Classical tradition, which had used syllabic metres (Dán Díreach), vernacular poets tended to use less complex forms of stressed metres (Scottish Gaelic: Òran) rooted in the repertoire of traditional singers. However, they shared with the Classic poets a set of complex metaphors and role, as the verse was still often panegyric. A number of these vernacular poets were women, such as Màiri nighean Alasdair Ruaidh (c. 1615–1707), a member of Clan MacLeod from the Isle of Harris. Iain Lom (c. 1624–c. 1710), a senior member of Clan MacDonald of Keppoch from Lochaber, was a Royalist poet and was appointed poet laureate of Scotland by King Charles II during the Restoration. Iain Lom recited a Gaelic eulogy at the King's coronation, and remained loyal to the House of Stuart even after their overthrow in 1688, opposing the Williamites and later, in his vituperative Òran an Aghaidh an Aonaidh, denouncing the 1707 Act of Union.

== Eighteenth century ==
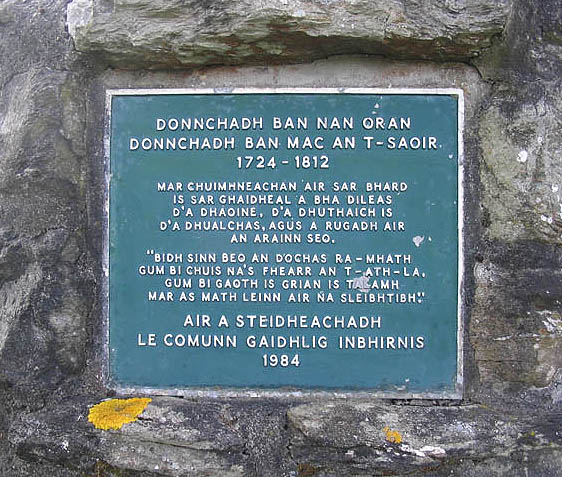
The Gaelic inscription plaque on the memorial to the poet Duncan Ban MacIntyre, born in 1724 at Druim Liaghart and who died in 1812.

The use of Scottish Gaelic suffered when Highlanders were persecuted after the Battle of Culloden in 1746, and during the Highland Clearances. The efforts of the Government to abolish the Gaelic language, however, dated back much earlier.

According to Marcus Tanner, the Society in Scotland for Propagating Christian Knowledge was incorporated under Queen Anne in 1709 and immediately began building both schools and libraries throughout the Gàidhealtachd with a twofold purpose. The first was to prevent the Gaels from, "backsliding to", the strictly illegal and still underground Catholic Church in Scotland. The second was to ensure, "that in process of time Britons from North to South may speak the same language". For this reason, S.S.P.C.K. schoolmasters were under orders to teach only in English and to subject any student who spoke Gaelic inside the school or on the playground to flogging.

Furthermore, in 1714 the Protestant Elector of Hanover mounted the British and Irish thrones as King George I and, with his assistance, the ascendent Whig political party seized absolute power and launched a purge of all Tories from the Government, the British Army, the Church of England, the legal profession, and local politics. Great Britain and Ireland became de facto single party states and were to remain so until King George III was crowned in 1760 and allowed the Tories back into the Government. Even so, some modern historians now call the period between 1714 and 1783 the "age of the Whig oligarchy."

An intense hostility felt by many Scottish Gaels to the House of Hanover was accordingly rooted in their enabling of its policies of centralized government, linguistic imperialism, and the systematic religious persecution of both the Catholic Church in Scotland and the Non-juring Scottish Episcopal Church. Opposition to these policies, which John Lorne Campbell was later to term, "a calculated genocidal campaign" against everything that truly mattered to the Gaels, are what motivated the Scottish clans to violently fight for regime change in the British Isles through the Jacobite risings, which Campbell has accordingly termed, "a natural reaction."

In the song Là Sliabh an t-Siorraim, Sìleas na Ceapaich, the daughter of the 15th Chief of Clan MacDonald of Keppoch, sings of the joy upon the arrival of Prince James Francis Edward Stuart, the indecisive Battle of Sheriffmuir and the state of uneasy anticipation between the battle and the end of the Jacobite rising of 1715.

The most iconic poem by Sìleas, however, inspired by the events of the Uprising was only completed many years later. When Ailean Dearg, the Chief of Clan Macdonald of Clanranald had been mortally wounded at the Battle of Sherrifmuir, Alasdair Dubh, 11th Chief of Clan MacDonald of Glengarry rallied the faltering warriors of Clan Donald by throwing up his blue bonnet and crying "Buillean an-diugh, tuiream a-màireach!" ("Blows today, mourning tomorrow!"). Following Alasdair Dubh's death (c. 1721 or 1724), he was eulogized by Sìleas in the song-poem Alistair à Gleanna Garadh, which hearkens back to the mythological poetry attributed to Amergin Glúingel and which remains an iconic and oft imitated work of Scottish Gaelic literature.

Roderick "Ruairidh Òg" Macleod, 19th Chief of Clan MacLeod, inspired the Bard Roderick Morison to compose the completely opposite song-poem Òran do Mhac Leoid Dhun Bheagain ("A Song to MacLeod of Dunvegan"). The song was meant to rebuke MacLeod for not fulfilling "the obligations of his office". Instead of patronizing the Gaelic Bards and hosting feasts at Dunvegan Castle for his clansmen and their families, Morison was disgusted that the Chief had become an absentee landlord in London, who, "spent his money on foppish clothes". In the poem, Morison urged the Chief in vain to emulate his predecessors.

Before Barra-born Traditional singer Calum Johnston performed Òran do Mhac Leoid Dhun Bheagain at the 1951 Edinburgh People's Festival Ceilidh, Hamish Henderson, who erroneously believed the poem to be about subsequent Whig Chief Norman MacLeod, who is still known in Gaelic as An Droch Dhuine ("The Wicked Man"), said, "It's one of the great songs in the Gaelic tongue, and the poetic concept in it is very great. The poet says that he left the castle, and he found on the slopes of the mountain the echo of past mirth, the echo of his own singing. And he then has a conversation with the echo about the fate of the House of MacLeod."

During the same era, the Jacobite war poet, satirist, and lexicographer Alasdair mac Mhaighstir Alasdair has been said to rank first among all bards of the Scottish Gaels, perhaps with only Sorley MacLean, of more recent fame, as an exception. He "owed little or nothing either to his predecessors or his contemporaries" in the field of poetry and many of his poems are available in anthologies of Scottish poetry.

He was the second son of Maighstir Alasdair (Fr. Alexander MacDonald) who was the Non-juring Episcopalian Rector of Kilchoan and Tacksman of Dalilea in Moidart and from whom his son received an education in the Western canon. His son's subsequent poetry, lexicography, and orthography were also informed by his acquisition and careful study of old Gaelic manuscripts.

While teaching at a school run by the Society in Scotland for Propagating Christian Knowledge at Kilchoan, the bard compiled the first secular book in Scottish Gaelic to be printed: Leabhar a Theagasc Ainminnin (1741), a Gaelic-English glossary.

The second secular book in Scottish Gaelic, which Alasdair published after serving as a Jacobite Army officer and teacher of the Gaelic language to Prince Charles Edward Stuart, was his 1751 poetry collection Ais-Eiridh na Sean Chánoin Albannaich (The Resurrection of the Ancient Scottish Language).

Until very recently, Gaelic poetry was widely assumed to be completely isolated from literature in other languages, but Alan Riach argues that Alasdair mac Mhaighstir Alasdair was both multi-lingual and very much aware of the ongoing Scottish Enlightenment. According to Riach, "With Duncan Ban MacIntyre, you have someone who is illiterate but fluent in Gaelic, and composes his poetry to be sung, to be performed, as music; with Alasdair mac Mhaighstir Alasdair and The Birlinn of Clanranald you have an extremely sophisticated poet who reads fluently in a number of languages. So he's familiar with Homer and Virgil and the great epics of classical literature. He's familiar with poetry being written in English at the time. He's familiar with poetry written in Scots. His own writing in Gaelic is part of that continuum, part of that context."

Due to his experiences as military officer and war poet during and after the Jacobite rising of 1745, Alasdair mac Mhaighstir Alasdair also remains the most overtly nationalist and anti-Whig Gaelic poet of the era and his 1751 poetry collection Ais-Eiridh na Sean Chánoin Albannaich was accordingly burned by the public hangman in Edinburgh.

Linguist Robert Dunbar, however, has called Alasdair mac Mhaighstir Alasdair, "the greatest poet of the eighteenth century Golden Age of Gaelic poets", and adds that the 1751 publication of Ais-eridh na Sean Chánoin Albannaich inspired the publication of, "an increasing number of important collections of Gaelic poetry."

In a 2020 article, Scottish nationalist Hamish MacPherson ranked the Clanranald Bard as one of the two greatest Scottish poets in any language. MacPherson also wrote, "It is a national disgrace that there is no national monument to Alasdair mac Mhaighstir Alasdair... I have no hesitation in saying that Alasdair is a seminal figure in the history of this country, for just as Robert Burns helped preserve the Scots language, so did Alasdair mac Mhaighstir Alasdair perform the same duty for Gaelic."

Another poet during the same uprising, Iain Ruadh Stiùbhart, the Colonel of the Edinburgh Regiment in the Jacobite Army, also composed well-known poems including "Lament for Lady Macintosh" and "Latha Chuil-Lodair" ("Culloden Day"), "Òran Eile air Latha Chu-Lodair ("Another Song on Culloden Day"), and Urnuigh Iain Ruadh ("John Roy's Prayer").

According to John Lorne Campbell, Stùibhart's literary and historical importance is increased by the fact that, "He was the only Jacobite leader who was a Gaelic poet. His Gaelic verse shows a polish and an elegance not possessed by his contemporaries, and it is much to be regretted that so few of his compositions have survived. He does not seem to have possessed the knowledge of writing his mother tongue. His two poems on Culloden are of great historical interest, revealing as they do the depth of bitterness that was felt towards the Prince's lieutenant general, Lord George Murray, by a section of the Jacobite leaders."

Due to the often "arbitrary and malicious violence" inflicted by Hanoverian Redcoats under the command of the Duke of Cumberland and Lord Albemarle, the aftermath of Culloden is still referred to in the Gàidhealtachd as Bliadhna nan Creach ("The Year of the Pillaging").

Other Scottish Gaelic poets produced laments on the Jacobite defeats of 1715 and 1745. Maighread nighean Lachlainn and Catriona Nic Fhearghais are among the female poets who reflected on the crushing effects of the aftermath of the Jacobite risings. A consequent sense of desolation pervaded the works of Scottish Gaelic writers such as Dughall Bochanan which mirrored many of the themes of the graveyard poets writing in England.

For example, Clan MacKay had sided with the House of Hanover during the Jacobite rising of 1745. Despite this, the MacKays were included in the repression of Gaelic culture that followed the Battle of Culloden in 1746. In Òran Nan Casagan Dubha ("The Song of the Black Cassocks"), Rob Donn MacKay's outraged response to the Dress Act 1746, the Bard denounced the banning of Highland dress and mocked the Lowland garb that was replacing it. Rob Donn considered the Dress Act to be so insulting that he urged Clan MacKay to change its allegiance from King George II to Prince Charles Edward Stuart.

When Robb Donn's patron, Ian mac Eachainn MacAoidh, died in 1757, Rob Donn praised the Clan MacKay tacksman of Strathmore (Scottish Gaelic: An Srath Mòr), in poetry, in a way normally reserved for much higher level members of the Scottish nobility. However, Rob Donn made an extremely, "uncharacteristic choice", for the writer of a Gaelic elegy or work of praise poetry. Rob Donn underlined his praise of Iain mac Eachainn, "by referring to the shortcomings of others... of his class. Here is a tacksman who is not simply concerned to gather wealth, but who is ready to share it with the needy. Robb Donn turns his elegy into a social document, in what is a highly refreshing way at this period."

A legacy of Jacobite verse was later compiled (and adapted) by James Hogg in his Jacobite Reliques (1819).

Donnchadh Bàn Mac an t-Saoir (usually Duncan Ban MacIntyre, in English; 20 March 1724 – 14 May 1812) a monoglot Gaelic-speaker who was illiterate in his own language, remains one of the most renowned of Scottish Gaelic poets and formed an integral part of one of the golden ages of Gaelic poetry in Scotland during the 18th century. He is best known for his poem about Beinn Dorain; "Moladh Beinn Dòbhrain" (English: "Praise of Ben Doran"). Most of his poetry is descriptive and the influence of Alasdair MacMhaighstir Alasdair is notable in much of it. Despite also composing poetry about fighting for the government in the Campbell of Argyll Militia during the 1745 Jacobite rising, MacIntyre also offers in his later poetry, according to John Lorne Campbell, "an interesting testimony to the bitter disillusionment of the Highlanders who had come to the aid of the Government, to be in the end treated no better that those who had rebelled against it." It was his experience as a ghillie in Argyll and Perthshire in the employ of the Duke of Argyll which had the greatest impact upon his poetry. Moladh Beinn Dòbhrain and Coire a' Cheathaich, both date from this period. The significance of Duncan Bàn's nature themed poetry is such that it has, along with that of MacMhaighstir Alasdair, been described as "the zenith of Gaelic nature poetry".

At Gairloch (Scottish Gaelic: Geàrrloch) during the same era lived the Romantic poet William Ross, who is, according to Derick S. Thomson, "justly regarded as the leading poet of love of the eighteenth century." Despite being widely viewed as a, "love-lorn romantic who died of unrequited love" for the noblewoman Mòr Ros (Lady Marion Ross), William Ross was very capable of poking fun at himself, as he did in the self-flyting poem Òran eadar am Bàrd agus Cailleach-mhilleadh-nan-dàn ("Exchange of Verses between the Poet and the Hag-who-spoils-poems").

His poetic range also covered Scotch whisky, chasing girls, and an iconic lament over the death in exile of Prince Charles Edward Stuart in 1788. According to John Lorne Campbell, William Ross' Gaelic lament for the Prince, which begins "Soraidh bhuan do'n t-Suaithneas Bhàn", ("Farewell to the White Cockade"), "is at once the Prince's only true elegy and the last genuine Jacobite poem composed in Scotland."

In his 1783 poem Moladh Gheàrrloch ("In Praise of Gairloch"), William Ross describes the Highland winter sport of shinty (Scottish Gaelic: camanachd, iomain), which was traditionally played by the Gaels upon St. Andrew's Day, Christmas Day, New Year's Day, Handsel Monday, and Candlemas. The Bard's account of the annual match played upon New Year's Day at ebb tide upon the Big Sand (Scottish Gaelic: Gainmheach Mhòr) of Gairloch, is, according to Ronald Black, "as succinct a description as we have of the great festive shinty matches of the past."

William Ross is said to have burned all his manuscripts, but his verses survived in Gairloch as oral poetry. They were ultimately written down by John MacKenzie from the dictation of those who had memorized them and published posthumously. His most famous song is the lament, Cuachag nan Craobh ("Cuckoo of the Tree"), the tune of which is now known throughout the Anglosphere as The Skye Boat Song, based on multiple sets of Scottish English lyrics composed a century later.

More recently, William Ross' poetry was a major influence upon Sorley MacLean, who remains one of the most important figures in 20th century Gaelic literature. MacLean considered William Ross' last song, Òran Eile, "one of the very greatest poems ever made in any language", in the British Isles and comparable to the best of William Shakespeare's 154 sonnets.

The North Uist poet John MacCodrum, the official Bard to Sir Alexander MacDonald of Sleat, composed poetry criticizing both the Scottish clan chiefs and the Anglo-Scottish landlords of the Highlands and Islands for the often brutal mass evictions of the Scottish Gaels that followed the Battle of Culloden and on mundane topics such as old age and whiskey.

Among MacCodrum's most popular anti-landlord poems mocks Aonghus MacDhòmhnaill, the post-Culloden tacksman of Griminish. It is believed to date from between 1769 and 1773, when overwhelming numbers of Sir Alexander MacDonald's tenants on the isles of North Uist and Skye were reacting to his rackrenting and other harsh treatments by immigrating to the district surrounding the Cape Fear River of North Carolina. The song is known in the oral tradition of North Uist as Òran Fir Ghriminis ("A Song of the Tacksman of Griminish"). The song is equally popular among speakers of Canadian Gaelic in Nova Scotia, where it is known under the differing title, Òran Aimereaga ("The Song of America").

=== Scottish Diaspora ===
Among the "earliest Scottish Gaelic poets in North America about whom we know anything", is Kintail-born Iain mac Mhurchaidh, descendant of the Clan Macrae tacksmen of Inverinate, who emigrated at the urging of Rev. John Bethune to a homestead along McLendons Creek, in what is now Moore County, North Carolina, around 1774. He continued composing Gaelic-poetry there until his death around 1780.

In the traditional Scottish culture of the Highlands and Islands, hunting was a traditional pastime for both nobles and warriors and eating fish or seafood was considered a sign a low birth or status. By this time, however, hunting was being increasingly treated as poaching by the Anglo-Scottish landlords. Iain mac Mhurchaidh had already composed a poem complaining that his hunting rights were being restricted and, for this and many other reasons, he decided on emigrating to the Colony of North Carolina.

He had no intention of going alone and composed many Gaelic poems and songs in which he urged his friends and relations to join him. In those poems, like many other Gaelic poets who were urging emigration during the same era, Iain mac Mhuirchaidh complained that warriors were no longer valued and that greed had come to mean more to the Chiefs and the Tacksmen than honor, family, or clan ties. Iain mac Mhurchaidh always concluded his poems by arguing that the Gaels would do well to abandon such a corrupted nobility and emigrate to the New World.

During the American Revolution, Iain mac Mhuirchaidh and his son Murdo Macrae fought as a Loyalist soldiers in the famous Highland charge at the Battle of Moore's Creek Bridge in February 1776. Even though his son fell, Iain mac Mhurchaidh later fought again as a Loyalist under the command of Major Patrick Ferguson at the Battle of King's Mountain in 1780. His many war poems which celebrate the British cause remain an important part of Scottish Gaelic literature.

According to Michael Newton, Iain mac Mhuirchaidh the war poet so inspired the Gaels settled along the Cape Fear River to rise up and fight for King George III that American Patriots, "treated him with great severity."

Even though there many other poems like it, one of the only surviving pro-Patriot Gaelic poems from the American Revolution was composed in Scotland, rather than in America. The poet skillfully invokes the two traditional attributes of an unworthy Scottish clan chief, raising the rent needlessly and spending the money on himself, and then lays those very attributes at the doors of both the Scottish nobility and King George III.

In 1783, the year that saw the end of the American Revolution and the beginning of the Highland Clearances in Inverness-shire, Cionneach mac Cionnich (Kenneth MacKenzie) (1758–1837), a poet from Clan MacKenzie who was born at Castle Leather near Inverness, and who died at Fermoy, County Cork, Ireland, composed The Lament of the North. In the poem, Cionneach mac Cionnich mocks the Scottish clan chiefs for becoming absentee landlords, for both rackrenting and evicting their clansmen en masse in favor of sheep, and of "spending their wealth uselessly", in London. He accuses King George III both of tyranny and of steering the ship of state into shipwreck. MacCionnich also argues that truth is on the side of George Washington and the Continental Army and that the Gaels would do well to emigrate from the Highlands and Islands to the United States before the King and the landlords take every farthing they have left. The poem appeared in MacKenzie's poetry collection, Òrain Ghaidhealach, agus Bearla air an eadar-theangacha.

The poet Mìcheal Mór MacDhòmhnaill emigrated from South Uist to Cape Breton around 1775 and a poem describing his first winter there survives. Anna NicGillìosa emigrated from Morar to Glengarry County, Ontario in 1786 and a Gaelic poem in praise of her new home there also survives.

=== The Ossian of James Macpherson ===
James Macpherson (1736–96), the nephew of Ewen MacPherson of Cluny, was the first Scottish poet to gain an international reputation. Claiming to have collected poetry by the demigod Ossian from the Fenian Cycle of Celtic mythology, Macpherson published translations from Scottish Gaelic that he proclaimed were an equivalent to the Classical epics of Homer and Virgil and which immediately became an international sensation. Fingal was published in 1762 and was speedily translated into many European languages. Its awe of the natural world and the melancholy tenderness of its treatment of ancient legends did more than any single work to create the Romantic movement, especially in German literature, where it influenced Herder and Goethe. Eventually it became clear that the poems were not exact translations from the Gaelic, but Mythopoeic adaptations. MacPherson had collected many contradictory accounts of the same stories from the Fenian Cycle and then chose to rewrite them into a coherent plot in order to suit the aesthetic expectations of his readers.

=== Bible translation ===
A Middle Irish translation of the Christian Bible, dating from the Elizabethan period but revised in the 1680s, was in use until the Bible was translated into Scottish Gaelic. Author David Ross notes in his 2002 history of Scotland that a Scottish Gaelic version of the Bible was published in London in 1690 by the Rev. Robert Kirk, Episcopalian Rector of Aberfoyle; however it was not widely circulated. The first well-known translation of the Bible into modern Scottish Gaelic was begun in 1767 when Rev. James Stuart of Killin and Dugald Buchanan of Rannoch produced a translation of the New Testament. Very few other European languages have developed a modern literary language without a much earlier vernacular and more widely available translation of the Bible. The lack of a well-known translation until the late 18th century may well have contributed to the decline of Scottish Gaelic. A highly acclaimed Roman Catholic translation of the New Testament into the Arisaig dialect of Scottish Gaelic, was made by Fr. Ewen MacEachan, worked over by Fr. Colin Grant, and finally published in 1875. Fr. MacEachan, a graduate of the Royal Scots College at Valladolid, also produced an important Gaelic-English dictionary as well as translations of Thomas a Kempis' The Imitation of Christ (Scottish Gaelic: Leanmhainn Chriosda), published in 1826, and Lorenzo Scupoli's The Spiritual Combat (Scottish Gaelic: An cath spioradail), published in 1835.

== Nineteenth century ==
The Highland Clearances and widespread emigration significantly weakened Gaelic language and culture and had a profound impact on the nature of Gaelic poetry.

=== Diaspora ===
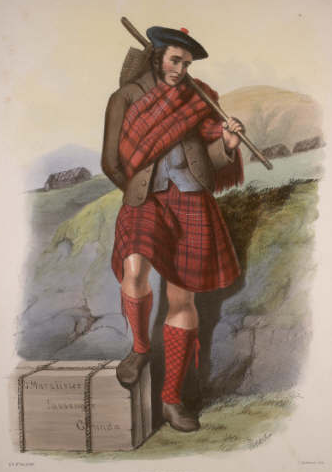
A romanticised early Victorian depiction of a member of Clan MacAlister leaving Scotland for Canada, by R. R. McIan

Emigration also resulted in Gàidhealtachd communities abroad, most notably in Canada and the United States, both of which produced a very large quantity of literature in the Scottish Gaelic language outside Scotland. Canadian and American Bards made sense of their relationship to their homeland as a diaspora in both romantic poetry praising their "an t-Seann Dùthaich" (English: "the Old Country") and political songs about the Highland Clearances. Many songs, such as "O mo dhùthaich," contain both themes.

In the Gàidhealtachd settlements along the Cape Fear River in North Carolina, the first Gaelic books published locally were religious tracts for the region's Presbyterian congregations. The first such book, Searmoin Chuaidh a Liobhairt ag an Raft Swamp ("Sermons at Raft Swamp"), was published by Rev. Dùghall Crauford, a Presbyterian minister and native speaker of Arran Gaelic, at Fayetteville, North Carolina in 1791. An edition of Dàin Spioradail ("Spiritual Verses") by Rev. Pàdraig Grannd was printed on the same press in 1826. The North Carolina Gaelic dialect by then was already going into decline. According to Marcus Tanner, despite the post-American Revolution redirection of Scottish Highland emigration towards Canada, a Gàidhealtachd continued to exist in North Carolina, "until it was well and truly disrupted", by the American Civil War.

According to Michael Newton, however, "Professor Catrìona Persons of St Francis Xavier University of Antigonish presented a talk about a recently discovered item to the International Celtic Congress in Edinburgh in 1994. The four verse song seems to have been composed in North Carolina about the time of the Civil War and mentions the dance the Reel of Tulloch, suggesting that the members of the Highland community were still engaged in traditional Gaelic song and dance to some degree at that time."

Lord Selkirk's early settler in Canada Calum Bàn MacMhannain, alias Malcolm Buchanan, left behind the song-poem Òran an Imrich ("The Song of Emigration"), which describes his 1803 voyage from the Isle of Skye to Belfast, Prince Edward Island and his impressions of his new home as Eilean an Àigh ("The Island of Prosperity"). Ailean a' Ridse MacDhòmhnaill emigrated from Glen Spean, Lochaber to Mabou, Cape Breton, Nova Scotia in 1816 and composed several Gaelic poems in the New World. The most prolific emigre poet was Iain mac Ailein, a native of Caolas, Tiree, and the former chief bard to the Chief of Clan MacLean of Coll, who emigrated with his family to Pictou County, Nova Scotia in 1819. In Nova Scotia, Iain Mac Ailein is known colloquially today as, "The Bard MacLean".

Robert Dunbar has dubbed MacLean, "perhaps the most important of all the poets who emigrated during the main period of Gaelic overseas emigration".

As there was at first no Gaelic-language printing press in Atlantic Canada, in 1819, Rev. Seumas MacGriogar, the first Gaelic-speaking Presbyterian minister appointed to Nova Scotia, had to publish his collection of Christian poetry in Glasgow.

Printing presses soon followed, though, and the first Gaelic-language books printed in Canada, all of which were Presbyterian religious books, were published at Pictou, Nova Scotia and Charlottetown, Prince Edward Island in 1832. The first Gaelic language books published in Toronto and Montreal, which were also Presbyterian religious books, appeared between 1835 and 1836. The first Catholic religious books published in the Gaelic-language were printed at Pictou in 1836.

In 1835, while living on a homestead at Glenbard, near Addington Forks, Antigonish County, Nova Scotia, Tiree-born poet Iain mac Ailein published twenty of his works of Christian poetry in Gaelic at Glasgow under the title, Laoidhean Spioradail le Iain MacGilleain ("Spiritual Songs by John MacLean").

According to Natasha Sumner and Aidan Doyle, "due to exceptional circumstances", John The Bard MacLean and Allan The Ridge MacDonald are the only 19th century North American Gaelic Bards from whom, "sizeable repertoires", still exist. Unlike John The Bard MacLean, however, who both wrote his own poetry down and successfully sought publishers for it, Allan The Ridge MacDonald was well known as a poet and Seanchaidh, "but he was not a compiler of manuscripts." The Gaelic verse of Allan The Ridge was shared by its author only as oral literature and we owe its survival primarily to Canadian Gaelic literary scholar and Presbyterian minister Rev. Alexander MacLean Sinclair (1840–1924), who persuaded the Bard's son, Alasdair a' Ridse MacDhòmhnaill, to write down everything he had learned from his father. A phrase that was to become a mantra in the letters and manuscripts of Alasdair a' Ridse was, "Sin Mar a' chuala mis' aig m' athair e", ("This is how I heard it from my father").

So much of the history, culture, literature, and traditions of Lochaber, as well as the Gaelic poetry of his father were written down by Alasdair a' Ridse that Raasay-born poet Sorley MacLean, who along with Alasdair mac Mhaighstir Alasdair remains one of the two greatest figures in the history of Scottish Gaelic literature, was later to comment that Rev. Sinclair, "had no need to come or to write to Scotland, as there was in Nova Scotia a great Seanchaidh, Alexander MacDonald of Ridge."

=== Scotland ===
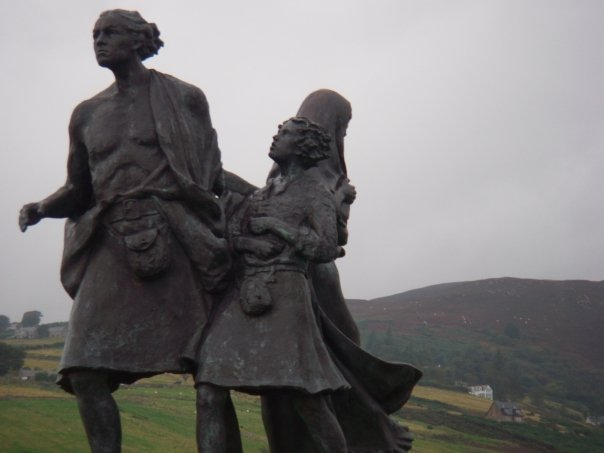
The Highland Emigrants' Monument at Helmsdale, Scotland.

Dr John MacLachlan, the author of Dìreadh a-mach ri Beinn Shianta, a poem on the Clearances in Ardnamurchan, is unusual for his outspoken criticism of the Anglo-Scottish landlords. More recently, the poem has influenced Sorley Maclean, who wrote a poem addressed Dr. MacLachlan.

In Sutherland, Eòghainn MacDhonnchaidh (Ewan Robertson, (1842 – 1895) of Tongue was called "the Bard of the Clearances"; is most famous for his song Mo mhallachd aig na caoraich mhòr ("My curses upon the Border sheep") mocking, among others, the Duchess of Sutherland and Patrick Sellar. The song has been recorded by notable singers Julie Fowlis and Kathleen MacInnes. There is a monument to Robertson in Tongue.

A similar poem in Gaelic attacks James Gillanders of Highfield Cottage near Dingwall, who was the Factor for the estate of Major Charles Robertson of Kincardine. As his employer was then serving with the British Army in Australia, Gillanders was the person most responsible for the mass evictions staged at Glencalvie, Ross-shire in 1845. The Gaelic-language poem denouncing Gillanders for the brutality of the evictions was later submitted anonymously to Pàdraig MacNeacail, the editor of the column in Canadian Gaelic in which the poem was published in the Antigonish, Nova Scotia newspaper The Casket. The poem, which is believed to draw upon eyewitness accounts, is believed to be the only Gaelic language source relating to the evictions in Glencalvie.

Enraged by what he saw as, "a war of attrition against the Gaels", embodied in the Highland Clearances, Bowmore poet and Scottish nationalist Uilleam Mac Dhun Lèibhe (1808–70) protested against the mass evictions ordered upon Islay, in the Inner Hebrides, after the island was purchased by James Morrison in the poem Fios Thun a' Bhard ("A Message for the Bard"), which was composed to the air When the kye came hame Mac Dhun Lèibhe presents in the poem, according to John T. Koch, "a stark view of an Islay in which the human world has been all but banished from the natural landscape."

In his 1861 poem Eirinn a' Gul ("Ireland Weeping"), Uilleam Mac Dhun Lèibhe recalled the many stories of his fellow Gaels on Inis Fáil (Ireland) he had heard in the Ceilidh houses of Islay, before that island was emptied by the Highland Clearances. He then lamented the destruction wreaked upon the Irish people by both famine and similar evictions ordered by Anglo-Irish landlords. He particularly laments the loss of the Chiefs of the Irish clans, who led their clansmen in war and provided "leadership of the old and true Gaelic kind". Mac Dhun Lèibhe comments sadly that the mid-19th century leaders and fighters for Irish republicanism had none of the heroic qualities shown by Red Hugh O'Donnell, Hugh O'Neill, and Hugh Maguire during the Nine Years War against Queen Elizabeth I. Sadly, but expressing hope for the future of the Irish people, Mac Dhun Lèibhe closes by asking where are the Irish clan warriors who charged out of the mist and slaughtered the armies of the Stranger at the Battle of the Yellow Ford and the Battle of Moyry Pass.

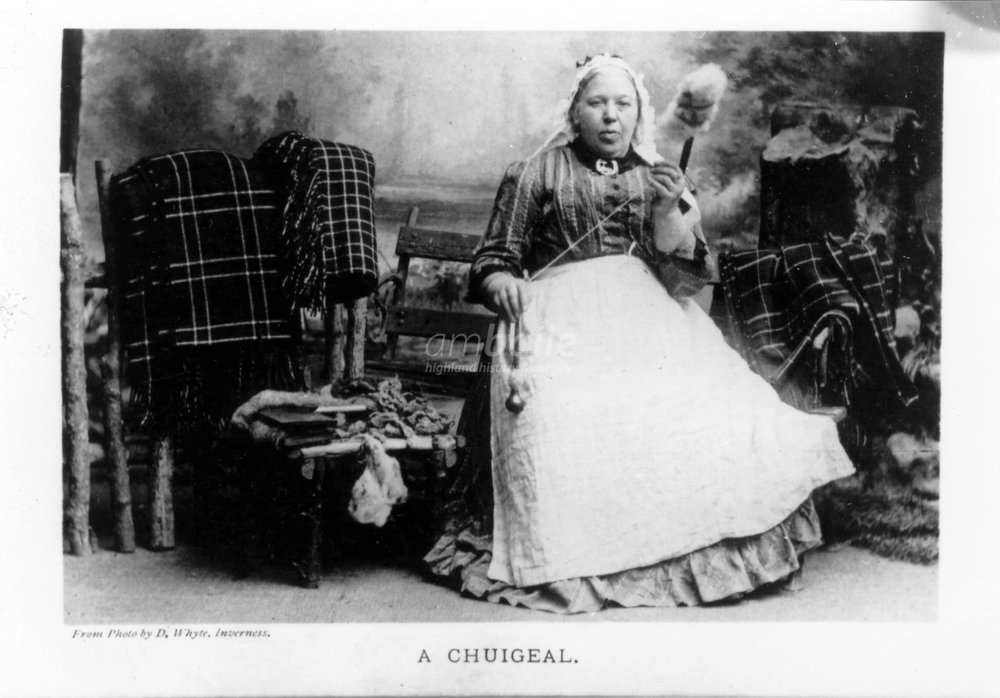
Photograph of Màiri Mhòr nam Òran (1818–1898).

Seonaidh Phàdraig Iarsiadair (John Smith, 1848–81) also composed a long and emotional condemnation of those responsible for the clearances Spiord a' Charthannais. The best known Gaelic poet of the era was Màiri Mhòr nan Òran, 1821–98), whose verse has been criticised for its lack of intellectual weight, but which embodies the spirit of the Highland Land League direct action campaigns of the 1870s and '80s and whose evocation of place and mood has made her among the most enduring Gaelic poets. Professor Donald E. Meek, however, has written that the songs of Mairi Mhòr nan Òran show the influence that the weekly newspaper The Highlander and its editor Murchadh na Feilidh had on both Scottish Gaelic literature and upon the opinions of ordinary Highland people, even though the articles were mainly printed in English.

Lochaber poet Eòghann MacLachlainn translated the first eight books of Homer's Iliad into Scottish Gaelic. He also composed and published his own Gaelic Attempts in Verse (1807) and Metrical Effusions (1816), and contributed greatly to the 1828 Gaelic–English Dictionary.

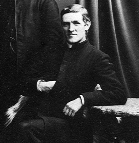
Fr. Allan MacDonald of Eriskay.

The Gaelic verse of Fr. Allan MacDonald (1859–1905), a Roman Catholic priest who was stationed at Oban, South Uist, and Eriskay, is mainly Christian poetry. He composed hymns and verse in honour of the Blessed Virgin, the Christ Child, and the Eucharist. However, several secular poems and songs were also composed by him. In some of these, Fr. MacDonald praises the beauty of Eriskay and its people, as in his iconic song poem Eilein na h-Òige ("Island of the Young").

In his comic verse drama, Parlamaid nan Cailleach ("The Parliament of Hags"), however, Fr. MacDonald lampoons the gossiping of his female parishioners and local courtship and marriage customs. Ronald Black has compared the play to similar works comic poetry from Irish literature in the Irish language, such as Domhnall Ó Colmáin's 1670 Párliament na mBan ("The Women's Parliament") and Brian Merriman's 1780 Cúirt an Mheán Oíche ("The Midnight Court").

Since his death, the enormous degree to which Fr. MacDonald's folklore and folksong research was plagiarized during his lifetime by other writers has been meticulously documented by John Lorne Campbell. Furthermore, Ronald Black praised Fr. MacDonald in 2002 as, "a huge literary talent", Black has also written that Fr. MacDonald's prophetic poem Ceum nam Mìltean deserves to be, "first in any anthology of the poetry of the First World War", and, "would not have been in any way out of place, with regard to style or substance", in Sorley MacLean's groundbreaking 1943 poetry collection Dàin do Eimhir. Black concluded by commenting that had Fr. Allan MacDonald not died prematurely at the age of only 45, "then the map of Gaelic literature in the twentieth century might have looked very different."

Under to the 1872 Education Act, school attendance was compulsory and only English was taught or tolerated in the schools of both the Lowlands and the Highlands and Islands. As a result, any student who spoke Scots or Scottish Gaelic in the school or on its grounds could expect what Ronald Black calls the, "familiar Scottish experience of being thrashed for speaking [their] native language."

In 1891, An Comunn Gàidhealach was founded in Oban to help preserve the Scottish Gaelic language and its literature and to establish the Royal National Mòd (Am Mòd Nàiseanta Rìoghail), as a festival of Gaelic music, literature, arts, and culture deliberately modelled upon the National Eisteddfod of Wales.

Before serving in the Seaforth Highlanders in British India and during the Fall of France in 1940, however, Gaelic language war poet Aonghas Caimbeul attended the 300-pupil Cross School on the Isle of Lewis after the 1872 Education Act. He later recalled, "A Lowlander, who had not a word of Gaelic, was the schoolmaster. I never had a Gaelic lesson in school, and the impression you got was that your language, people, and tradition had come from unruly, wild, and ignorant tribes and that if you wanted to make your way in the world you would be best to forget them completely. Short of the stories of the German Baron Münchhausen, I have never come across anything as dishonest, untruthful, and inaccurate as the history of Scotland as taught in those days."

Even so, large numbers of the Scottish people, both Highlander and Lowlander, continued to enlist in the British armed forces and Scottish regiments becoming renowned worldwide as shock troops.

For this reason, literary critic Wilson MacLeod has written that, in post-Culloden Scottish Gaelic literature, anti-colonialist poets such as Duncan Livingstone "must be considered isolated voices. The great majority of Gaelic verse, from the eighteenth century onwards, was steadfastly Pro-British and Pro-Empire, with several poets, including Aonghas Moireasdan and Dòmhnall MacAoidh, enthusiastically asserting the conventual justificatory rationale for imperial expansion, that it was a civilising mission rather than a process of conquest and expropriation. Conversely, there is no evidence that Gaelic poets saw a connection between their own difficult history and the experience of colonised people in other parts of the world."

== Twentieth century ==
The first novel in Scottish Gaelic was John MacCormick's Dùn-Àluinn, no an t-Oighre 'na Dhìobarach, which was serialised in the People's Journal in 1910, before publication in book form in 1912. The publication of a second Scottish Gaelic novel, An t-Ogha Mòr by Angus Robertson, followed within a year.

=== World War I ===
When the First World War began, Scotland was filled with patriotic euphoria and an enormous number of young men rushed up to enlist in the British armed forces. During the war, the devastating effectiveness of Highland charges in trench warfare caused the kilt-wearing soldiers the Scottish regiments to be dubbed, "Die Damen aus der Hölle" ("The Ladies from Hell") by the soldiers of the Imperial German Army on the Western Front. In the 1996 memoir The Sea Hunters: True Adventures with Famous Shipwrecks, American author and explorer Clive Cussler revealed that his father, Eric Edward Cussler, served with the Imperial German Army on the Western Front during World War I. In later years, Eric Cussler used to tell his son that French Poilus were, "mediocre fighters", that British Tommies were, "tenacious bulldogs", and that American Doughboys, were, "real scrappers." Eric Cussler always added, however, "But my German comrades took anything they could all dish out. It was only when we heard the bagpipes from, 'The Ladies from Hell,' that we oozed cold sweat and knew a lot of us wouldn't be going home for Christmas."

Despite their effectiveness, however, the Scottish regiments suffered horrendous losses on the battlefield, which included many war poets who wrote in Scottish Gaelic.

The Scottish Gaelic poet John Munro, a native of Swordale on the Isle of Lewis, won the Military Cross while serving as a 2nd Lieutenant with the Seaforth Highlanders and was ultimately killed in action during the 1918 Spring Offensive. Lt. Munro, writing under the pseudonym Iain Rothach, came to be ranked by critics alongside the major war poets. Tragically, only three of his poems are known to survive. They are Ar Tir ("Our Land"), Ar Gaisgich a Thuit sna Blàir ("Our Heroes Who Fell in Battle"), and Air sgàth nan sonn ("For the Sake of the Warriors"). Derick Thomson – the venerable poet and Professor of Celtic Studies at Glasgow – hailed Munro's work in his Companion to Gaelic Scotland as being: "the first strong voice of the new Gaelic verse of the 20th century".

Ronald Black has written that Munro's three poems leave behind, "his thoughts on his fallen comrades in tortured free verse full of reminiscence-of-rhyme; forty more years were to pass before free verse became widespread in Gaelic."

Pàdraig Moireasdan, a Scottish Gaelic bard and seanchaidh from Grimsay, North Uist, served in the Lovat Scouts during World War I. He served in the Gallipoli Campaign, in the Macedonian front, and on the Western Front. In later years, Moireasdan, who ultimately reached the rank of corporal, loved to tell how he fed countless starving Allied soldiers in Thessalonica by making a quern. Corporal Moireasdan composed many poems and songs during the war, including Òran don Chogadh ("A Song to the War"), which he composed while serving at Gallipoli.

In 1969, Gairm, a publishing house based in Glasgow and specializing in Scottish Gaelic literature, posthumously published the first book of collected poems by Dòmhnall Ruadh Chorùna. The poet, who had died two years previously in the hospital at Lochmaddy on the island of North Uist, was a combat veteran of the King's Own Cameron Highlanders during World War I and highly talented poet in the Gaelic language.

According to Ronald Black, "Dòmhnall Ruadh Chorùna is the outstanding Gaelic poet of the trenches. His best known song An Eala Bhàn ("The White Swan") was produced there for home consumption, but in a remarkable series of ten other compositions he describes what it looked, felt, sounded and even smelt like to march up to the front, to lie awake on the eve of battle, to go over the top, to be gassed, to wear a mask, to be surrounded by the dead and dying remains of Gaelic-speaking comrades, and so on. Others of his compositions contain scenes of deer hunting, a symbolically traditional pursuit of which he happened to be passionately fond, and which he continued to practice all his life."

Unlike Charles Sorley, Wilfred Owen and Siegfried Sassoon, Dòmhnall Ruadh believed himself to be fighting a just war against a terrible enemy. The Bard's anger over the futility of the war only boiled over after the Armistice.

=== Interwar period ===
According to John A. Macpherson, "After the war, Dòmhnall Ruadh returned home to Corùna, but although he was thankful to be alive, he was, like most other returning soldiers, disillusioned. The land which they had been promised was as securely held by the landlords as it had ever been, and so were the hunting and fishing rights."

Many years later, Dòmhnall expressed his feelings about the years that followed the war in his poem, Caochladh Suigheachadh na Duthcha ("Changed Days"). He recalled the poverty of his youth and how he and his fellow Gaels went away to war and frustrated the Kaiser's war aims at a truly unspeakable cost in lives. Meanwhile, the Anglo-Scottish landlords of the Highlands and Islands stayed home and got richer. He recalled how after the war there was no work and how the Gaels emigrated from Scotland to all corners of the world. For those who stayed, there was no food except what was grown and ground by hand and supplemented by occasional discreet defiance of the landlords' bans on hunting and fishing.

Dòmhnall used to often say of those same years, "If it weren't for the gun and what I poached, it would have been dire poverty."

In his poem Dhan Gàidhlig ("For Gaelic"), Dòmhnall called for language revival and urged his fellow Gaels to "forget English", saying he had no use for it. He urged his listeners to remember their warrior ancestors from the Scottish clans, who never gave way in battle while there was still a head on their shoulders. Dòmhmnall compared the Gaelic language to a tree that had lost its branches and leaves. But he said that if people were to dig and weed around the base of its trunk, the tree would grow again and spread its leaves and branches. Dòmhnall expressed the hope that the descendants of the Gaels who were evicted during the Highland Clearances would return from around the world to hear from those who had stayed how heartlessly the landlords treated their ancestors. Dòmhnall also expressed a vision of the Scottish Gaeldom prosperous and teeming with children and how sheep, with which the landlords replaced those whom they evicted, would be replaced with Highland cattle. Dòmhnall concluded by predicting that the women in the milking fold will sing Gaelic songs and recite Gaelic poems as they work.

=== World War II ===
The revitalisation of Gaelic poetry in the twentieth century, known as the Scottish Gaelic Renaissance was largely due to the work of Sorley Maclean (Somhairle MacGill-Eain, 1911–96). He was raised in the Free Presbyterian Church of Scotland, which he later described as "the strictest of Calvinist fundamentalism" on the Isle of Raasay. He had become, by the outbreak of World War II, a Communist-sympathiser. MacLean was also a war poet who wrote about his combat experiences with the Royal Corps of Signals during the Western Desert campaign. MacLean's time in the firing line ended after he was severely wounded at the Second Battle of El Alamein in 1941.

MacLean's most famous Gaelic war poem is Glac a' Bhàis ("The Valley of Death"), which relates his thoughts on seeing a dead German soldier in North Africa. In the poem, MacLean ponders what role the dead man may have played in Nazi atrocities against both German Jews and members of the Communist Party of Germany. MacLean concludes, however, by saying that whatever the German soldier may or may not have done, he showed no pleasure in his death upon Ruweisat Ridge.

Following the war, MacLean would go on to become a major figure in world literature. He was described by the Scottish Poetry Library as "one of the major Scottish poets of the modern era" because of his "mastery of his chosen medium and his engagement with the European poetic tradition and European politics". Northern Irish poet and winner of the Nobel Prize for Literature Seamus Heaney has credited MacLean with saving Scottish Gaelic poetry.

Aonghas Caimbeul (1903–1982), a Scottish Gaelic poet from Swainbost on the Isle of Lewis, had served during the Interwar Period with the Seaforth Highlanders in British India. While there, Caimbeul had heard Mahatma Gandhi speak and had also seen the aviator Amy Johnson. Therefore, upon the outbreak of World War II in September 1939, Caimbeul rejoined his old regiment and saw combat against the invading Wehrmacht during the Fall of France. After Major-General Victor Fortune surrendered the 51st (Highland) Division to Major-General Erwin Rommel at Saint-Valery-en-Caux on 12 June 1940, Caimbeul spent the rest of the war as a POW at Stalag XX-A, near Thorn, in Occupied Poland, where he mostly did unpaid agricultural labour.

In his award-winning memoir Suathadh ri Iomadh Rubha, Caimbeul recalled the origins of his poem, Deargadan Phòland ("The Fleas of Poland"), "We called them the Freiceadan Dubh ('Black Watch'), and any man they didn't reduce to cursing and swearing deserved a place in the courts of the saints. I made a satirical poem about them at the time, but that didn't take the strength out of their frames or the sharpness out of their sting."

Caimbeul composed other poems during his captivity, including Smuaintean am Braighdeanas am Pòland, 1944 ("Thoughts on Bondage in Poland, 1944").

After a three-month-long death march from Thorn to Magdeburg which he graphically describes in his memoirs, Caimbeul was finally liberated on April 11, 1945. He returned to his native Swainbost and spent his life there as a shopkeeper until he died at Stornoway on January 28, 1982.

Aonghas Caimbeul's collected poems, Moll is Cruithneachd, were published at Glasgow in 1972 and were favorably reviewed.

Caimbeul's memoirs, Suathadh ri Iomadh Rubha, which won the £200 prize in a contest offered by the Gaelic Books Council, were also published at Glasgow in 1973. Of the memoir, Ronald Black has written, "It is a remarkable achievement consisting as it does of the memoirs of an exciting life, woven together with a forthright personal philosophy and much detailed ethnological commentary on tradition and change in island communities during the twentieth century, all steeped in a solution of anecdote, sometimes brilliantly funny. It is the twentieth century's leading work of Gaelic nonfictional prose."

While similarly en route to captivity as a POW in Nazi Germany in June 1940, South Uist native and fellow 51st (Highland) Division soldier Dòmhnall Iain Dhonnchaidh composed a lament for his fellow soldiers who had lost their lives before the Division surrendered. The result is the Gaelic song poem "Na Gillean nach Maireann" ("The Lads that Are No More"), which he set to the air "O ho nighean, è ho nighean" and which bears a strong resemblance to the poem "Tha Mi Duilich, Cianail, Duilich" ("I am Sad, Lamenting, and Full of Sorrow"), which was composed for very similar reasons during World War I by his cousin Dòmhnall Ruadh Chorùna.

In accordance with the Third Geneva Convention, POWs like Dòmhnall MacDonald, who were below the rank of Sergeant, were required to work. MacDonald spent his captivity attached to Arbeitskommando ("labour units") and doing unpaid labour, mainly in quarries and salt mines. MacDonald later described, "in harrowing detail", his experiences in enemy captivity in the postwar memoir Fo Sgàil a' Swastika ("Under the Shadow of the Swastika").

Similarly to his contemporary Alexander Solzhenitsyn while imprisoned in the Gulag, Dòmhnall Iain Dhonnchaidh composed many works of oral poetry during forced labour in German captivity, all of which he memorized and was only able to write down and edit for publication following the end of the war and his release.

Furthermore, Dòmhnall Iain Dhonnchaidh's World War II experiences in both combat and as a POW in German captivity left him as a fervent Scottish nationalist with an intensive hatred of colonialism, militarism, and war; which later expressed itself in many works of Gaelic poetry condemning what he considered the wasteful loss of human life due to World War I, World War II, the Cold War, the Troubles in Northern Ireland, and the 1967 Abortion Act.

Furthermore, in "Moch sa Mhadainn 's Mi Dùsgadh" ("Rising Early"), Dòmhnall Iain Dhonnchaidh somewhat facetiously rewrote Scottish national poet Alasdair mac Mhaighstir Alasdair's "Òran Eile donn Phrionnsa" ("A New Song to the Prince"), which celebrates the arrival in Scotland of Prince Charles Edward Stuart, the raising of his standard at Glenfinnan, and the beginning of the Jacobite rising of 1745. In Dòmhnall Iain Dhonnchaidh's version, which is sung to the exact same melody, he instead speaks of his joy at waking up on board a ship that was about to return him to South Uist after five years in enemy captivity.

In 1948, MacDonald's poem "Moladh Uibhist" ("In Praise of Uist"), which he had composed while being held as a POW and carefully edited for publication following his release, won the Bardic Crown at the Royal National Mòd at Glasgow. In the poem, which is in strict bardic metre, Dòmhnall lamented what he had come to see in enemy captivity as his own stupidity in not properly appreciating the peacetime and civilian life that had once bored him so terribly. He called the reckoning of his wartime experiences bitter and praised the natural beauty, wildlife, history, and culture of his native island at considerable length.

With these changed beliefs in mind, Dòmhnall Iain Dhonnchaidh would often say following his return from German captivity, "I learned more in those five years than I could have in eighty years of ordinary living."

Calum MacNeacail (1902–1978), a Scottish Gaelic poet from Gedintailor, Isle of Skye, served in the Royal Air Force during the Second World War. In his 1946 poem Cùmhnantan Sìthe Pharis ("The Paris Peace Treaties"), MacNeacail praised the atomic bombings of Hiroshima and Nagasaki and threatened the same fate against Joseph Stalin and Vyacheslav Molotov if they continued refusing to cooperate with the Western Allies.

=== Postwar ===
After returning home following combat in the North African Campaign, Sorley MacLean abandoned the stylistic conventions of the Bardic tradition and opened up new possibilities for composition with his Symbolist-inspired poetry collection Dàin do Eimhir (Poems for Eimhir, 1943). Considered MacLean's masterpiece, the poems deal with intertwining themes of romantic love, landscape, Scottish history, the Highland Clearances, and the Spanish Civil War. They are among the most important literary works ever written in the Scottish Gaelic language.

MacLean's work inspired a new generation to take up nea bhardachd ("The New Poetry"). These included Deòrsa Mac Iain Dheòrsa, (1915–1984), Lewis-born poets Ruaraidh MacThòmais, (1921–2012) and Iain Mac a' Ghobhainn, (1928–98). They all focused on the issues of exile, the fate of the Gaelic language and bi-culturalism. Aonghas MacNeacail, (b. 1942), amongst the most prominent post-war Gaelic poets, was influenced by new American poetry, particularly the Black Mountain School.

On March 28, 1956, when BBC Scotland played a recording of a Scottish Gaelic language ceilidh by the soldiers of the King's Own Cameron Highlanders during the Korean War, Dòmhnall Ruadh Chorùna, who has served in the same regiment during World War I, was listening. He later composed the poem Gillean Chorea ("The Lads in Korea"), in which he declared that the recording had brought back his youth.

The 1960s and 1970s also saw the flourishing of Scottish Gaelic drama. Key figures included Iain Mac a' Ghobhainn, whose plays explored wide-ranging themes. Often humorous, they also dealt with serious topics such as the betrayal of Christ in An Coileach (A Cockerel, 1966) of the Highland Clearances in A' Chùirt (The Court, 1966). Iain Moireach's plays also used humour to deal with serious subjects, as in Feumaidh Sinn a Bhith Gàireachdainn (We Have to Laugh, 1969), which focused on threats to the Gaelic language. Other major figures included Tormod Calum Dòmhnallach (1927–2000), whose work included Anna Chaimbeul (Anna Campbell, 1977), which was influenced by Japanese Noh theatre. Fionnlagh MacLeòid's (Finley Macleod) work included Ceann Cropic (1967), which was strongly influenced by the theatre of the absurd. Similarly, Donaidh MacIlleathain (Donnie Maclean), made use of absurd dialogue in An Sgoil Dhubh (A Dark School, 1974). Many of these authors continued writing into the 1980s and even the 1990s, but this was something of a golden age for Gaelic drama that has not been matched.

=== Diaspora ===
The cowboy poet Murchadh MacGilleathain ("Murdo MacLean"), a native of Coigach in Wester Ross, was one of many Gaels who emigrated to the American West prior to the Great War. Around 1910, MacGilleathain expressed his loneliness and homesickness in a song-poem composed upon his cattle ranch in Montana: 'S ann a fhuair mi m' àrach an taobh tuath de Alba mhòr ("It was in the north of great Scotland that I was reared"). As he expressed hope to do in the song, Murchadh permanently returned home to Coigach and his song was collected and recorded by the School of Scottish Studies from Maighread Cros in the village of Ceann Loch Iù, along Loch Maree, in Wester Ross.

For Gaels from the Canadian Gaelic-speaking communities of Nova Scotia and Prince Edward Island, the American city of Boston, Massachusetts and its suburbs remained a particular draw to the point that one contemporary writer compared emigration to Boston to a gold rush, and many works of Gaelic poetry were composed there. For example, according to Celticist Michael Newton, "After Mrs. Catherine MacInnes moved from Cape Breton to Boston, she composed a Gaelic translation of The Star Spangled Banner."

In 1917, Rev. Murdoch Lamont (1865-1927), a Gaelic-speaking Presbyterian minister from Orwell, Queens County, Prince Edward Island, published a small, vanity press booklet titled, An Cuimhneachain: Òrain Céilidh Gàidheal Cheap Breatuinn agus Eilean-an-Phrionnsa ("The Remembrance: Céilidh Songs of the Cape Breton and Prince Edward Island Gaels") in Quincy, Massachusetts. In Rev. Lamont's pamphlet and due to his work as a collector, the most complete versions survive of the Canadian Gaelic oral poetry composed upon Prince Edward Island before the loss of the language there, including the 1803 song-poem Òran an Imrich ("The Song of Emigration") by Calum Bàn MacMhannain (Malcolm Buchanan) and Òran le Ruaraidh Mór MacLeoid by Ruaraidh Mór Belfast, (Roderick MacLeod), both of whom were from the district of Belfast, Prince Edward Island.

In 1924, a Canadian Gaelic poetic tribute to the Canadian Corps soldiers of the 85th Battalion (Nova Scotia Highlanders) was composed by Alasdair MacÌosaig of St. Andrew's Channel, Cape Breton, Nova Scotia. The poem praised the courage of the fallen Canadian Gaels and told them that they had fought better against the Imperial German Army than the English did, while also lamenting the absence of fallen soldiers from their families and villages. The poem ended by denouncing the invasion of Belgium and vowing, even though Kaiser Wilhelm II had managed to evade prosecution by seeking and being granted political asylum in the neutral Netherlands, that he would one day be tried for war crimes and hanged. The poem was first published in the bilingual Antigonish newspaper The Casket on February 14, 1924.

The Gaelic poet Iain Eairdsidh MacAsgaill, (1898—1934), who is widely known as the Bàrd Bheàrnaraigh ("the Bard of Bernera"), was one of many Gaels who emigrated from Scotland during the interwar period. After arriving in the Wheatbelt region of Western Australia, Iain Eairsidh farmed near Lake Varley from 1925 to 1933. He is best known for his poems and songs expressing homesickness and his regret for ever leaving Scotland, which remain an important part of Gaelic literature.

The poet Duncan Livingstone (1877–1964) was born in his grandfather's Croft at Reudle, near Torloisk on the Isle of Mull. His father, Donald Livingstone (Dòmhnall Mac Alasdair 'ic Iain 'ic Dhòmhnall 'ic Dhonnchaidh) (1843–1924) was a joiner and stone-mason. According to the family oral tradition, the poet's paternal grandfather was the uncle of the missionary and explorer David Livingstone. The Poet's mother was Jane MacIntyre (Sine nighean Donnchaidh mhic Iain) (1845–1938), a native of Ballachulish who was said to be the grandniece of the Gaelic poet Duncan Ban MacIntyre (1724–1812).

After serving in the British Army during the Second Anglo-Boer War, Livingstone emigrated permanently to South Africa in 1903. While living a comfortable and prosperous life with his wife in Pretoria, Livingstone published several poems in Gaelic about the Second World War. They included an account of the Battle of the River Plate and also a lament, in imitation of Sìleas na Ceapaich's iconic 1723 lament, Alistair à Gleanna Garadh, in honor of Livingstone's nephew, Pilot Officer Alasdair Ferguson Bruce of the Royal Air Force, who was shot down and killed during a mission over Nazi Germany in 1941.

From his home in South Africa, Gaelic-poet Duncan Livingstone contemptuously mocked the collapse of the British Empire after World War II with the satirical Gaelic poem, Feasgar an Duine Ghil ("The Evening of the White Man").

The subsequent rise of the Afrikaner nationalist National Party and its White Supremacist policy of Apartheid, however, troubled Livingstone deeply. The Poet's nephew, Prof. Ian Livingstone, recalls, "I visited Duncan (from Uganda) at his hotel (the Union Hotel, Pretoria) in 1959. He was resident there. Later, when I was back in Uganda, he sent me a long poem, in English (10 pages) on Sharpeville, where some 77 Africans had been shot dead by police (mostly in the back). This had obviously affected him greatly. Unfortunately, I don't have the copy anymore."

The Sharpeville massacre also inspired Livingstone to write the Gaelic poem Bean Dubha' Caoidh a Fir a Chaidh a Marbhadh leis a' Phoiles ("A Black Woman Mourns her Husband Killed by the Police").

=== Recent developments ===
Modern Gaelic poetry has been most influenced by Symbolism, transmitted via poetry in English, and by Scots language poetry. Traditional Gaelic poetry utilised an elaborate system of metres, which modern poets have adapted to their own ends. Deòrsa Mac Iain Dheòrsa looks beyond the popular metres of the 19th and 20th centuries back to Dán Díreach and other forms from Irish bardic poetry. Donald MacAuley's poetry is concerned with place and community. The following generation of Gaelic poets writing at the end of the 20th century lived in a bilingual world to a greater extent than any other generation, with their work most often accompanied in publication by a facing text in English. Such confrontation has inspired semantic experimentation, seeking new contexts for words, and going as far as the explosive and neologistic verse of Fearghas MacFhionnlaigh (1948- ).

Scottish Gaelic poetry has been the subject of literary translation not only into English, but also into other Celtic languages. For example, the poetry of both Maoilios Caimbeul and Màiri NicGumaraid has been translated into the Irish-language, and John Stoddart has produced anthologies of Gaelic poetry translated into Welsh.

Scottish Gaelic literature is currently undergoing a revival. In the first half of the 20th century only about four or five books in Gaelic were published each year. Since the 1970s this number has increased to over 40 titles per year.

South Uist-born Gaelic poet and novelist Angus Peter Campbell (Scottish Gaelic: Aonghas Pàdraig Caimbeul), whose writings combine Hebridean mythology and folklore with Magic realism inspired by the writings of Gabriel García Márquez, Jorge Luis Borges, and Italo Calvino, credits his mentors Iain Crichton Smith and Sorley MacLean with teaching him, "that poetry was a great international language and that Gaelic could proudly stand alongside Spanish or Greek or Russian or English or whatever in that great discourse."

In a 1992 interview with The Highland Free Press, Sorley MacLean referred to Angus Peter Campbell as one of the best living Scottish poets in any language.

== Twenty-First century ==
With regard to Gaelic poetry this includes the Great Book of Gaelic, An Leabhar Mòr, a Scottish Gaelic, English and Irish language collaboration featuring the work of 150 poets, visual artists and calligraphers. Established contemporary poets in Scottish Gaelic include Meg Bateman, Aonghas Phàdraig Caimbeul, Maoilios Caimbeul, Rody Gorman, Aonghas MacNeacail and Crìsdean MacIlleBhàin. Marcas Mac an Tuairneir, an award-winning poet cemented the place of second-language Gaelic learners and gay people in his 2014 collection, Deò.

According to Natasha Sumner, the current language revival of Canadian Gaelic in Nova Scotia was largely instigated by Kenneth E. Nilsen (1941–2012), an American linguist with a specialty in Celtic languages. During his employment as Professor of Gaelic Studies at St. Francis Xavier University in Antigonish, Nilsen was known for his contagious enthusiasm for the distinctive Nova Scotia dialect of the Gaelic language, its folklore and its oral literature. Several important figures in the recent Canadian Gaelic revival, including the poet Lewis MacKinnon (Lodaidh MacFhionghain), have credited Nilsen with sparking their interest in learning the Gaelic language and in actively fighting for its survival.

In a major innovation, the 2011 Royal National Mòd, held at Stornoway on the Isle of Lewis, crowned Lewis MacKinnon (Lodaidh MacFhionghain), a poet in Canadian Gaelic from Antigonish County, Nova Scotia, as the winning Bard. It was the first time in the 120-year history of the Mòd that a writer of Gaelic poetry from the Scottish diaspora had won the Bardic Crown.

Following Prof. Nilsen's death in 2012, Antigonish bard Lewis MacKinnon (Lodaidh MacFhionghain) composed a Gaelic-language poetic lament for his former teacher, which is titled Do Choinneach Nilsen, M'Oide.

Gaelic prose has expanded also, particularly with the development since 2003 of the Ùr-sgeul series published by CLÀR, which encourages new works of Gaelic fiction by both established and new writers.

Since the turn of the millennium, Angus Peter Campbell, besides his three Scottish Gaelic poetry collections, has also published five Gaelic novels: An Oidhche Mus Do Sheol Sinn (2003), Là a' Deanamh Sgeil Do Là (2004), An Taigh-Samhraidh (2006), Tilleadh Dhachaigh (2009) and Fuaran Ceann an t-Saoghail (2011).

Other established fiction writers include Alasdair Caimbeul and his brother Tormod, Catrìona Lexy Chaimbeul, Alison Lang, Dr Finlay MacLeod, Iain F. MacLeod, Norma MacLeod, Mary Anne MacDonald and Duncan Gillies. New fiction writers include Mairi E. MacLeod and the writers of the An Claigeann Damien Hirst (Ùr-sgeul, 2009) and Saorsa (Ùr-sgeul, 2011) anthologies. In 2013, the first ever Scottish Gaelic hard science fiction novel, Air Cuan Dubh Drilseach by Tim Armstrong, was published by CLÀR.

Lewis MacKinnon's 2017 Canadian Gaelic poetry collection Ràithean airson Sireadh ("Seasons for Seeking"), includes both his original poetry and his literary translations of the Persian poetry of Sufi mystic Rumi, all of which are themed around the seasons of the year.

Within Gaelic drama, two Gaelic theatre companies were recently professionally active: Fir Chlis and Tosg, which was managed by the late Simon MacKenzie. Most recently, the Gaelic drama group Tog-I, established by Arthur Donald, has attempted to revive the sector.

Even though some resent the promotion of a Scottish Gaelic language revival through the use of immersion schools in the Lowlands, in 2019 Niall O'Gallagher, a poet in the new urban dialect known as Glasgow Gaelic, was appointed Bàrd Baile Ghlaschu, or as the City of Glasgow's first ever Gaelic language Poet Laureate.

== Collections ==
- The National Library of Scotland holds over 3000 Gaelic books, including several distinct collections.
- The University of Edinburgh's Gaelic material includes the School of Scottish Archives Studies, the Carmichael Watson Collection, the archives of Gaelic scholar Donald MacKinnon, and the Laing Collection.
- University College London holds c.700 items from the Gaelic Society of London.

== See also ==
- Book of Deer
- Book of the Dean of Lismore
- CLÀR
- Fernaig manuscript
- Glenmasan manuscript
- Islay Charter
- Ùr-sgeul
