= Iain mac Mhurchaidh =

Scottish Gaelic poet

Iain Mhurchaidh
- Born: c. 1725; Scotland, Great Britain
- Died: c. 1780 (aged c. 55)
- Allegiance: Great Britain
- Service years: 1776–1780
- Conflicts: American Revolutionary War Battle of Moore's Creek Bridge (POW) Battle of Kings Mountain
- Children: 1 son

Iain mac Mhurchaidh, alias John MacRae (c. 1725 – c. 1780), was a Scotland-born bard from Kintail, a member of Clan Macrae, and an early immigrant to the Colony of North Carolina. MacRae has been termed one of the "earliest Scottish Gaelic poets in North America about whom we know anything."

MacRae fought as a Loyalist soldier during the American Revolution at the Battle of Moore's Creek Bridge and at the Battle of King's Mountain. His many war poems which celebrate the British cause during the Revolutionary War are an important part of Scottish Gaelic literature and remain popular among speakers of Canadian Gaelic.

According to Michael Newton, MacRae the war poet so inspired the Gaels settled along the Cape Fear River to rise up and fight for King George III that American Patriots, "treated him with great severity." During the 21st century, his song (Scottish Gaelic: Tha mi sgìth ‘n fhògar seo) ("I am weary of this exile"), was recorded for the soundtrack to the 7th season of the television series Outlander.

== Early life ==
Iain mac Mhurchaidh was born at Lianag a’ Chùl Doire in Kintail. He was the son of Murdo, who was the son of Farquhar, who was the fourth son of Alasdair MacRae of Inverinate (Scottish Gaelic: Inbhir Ìonaid), a gentleman in the service of the Earls of Seaforth.

Through their mutual descent from Alasdair MacRae, 8th of Inverinate, Iain mac Mhurchaidh was the first cousin once removed of fellow Kintyre Gaelic poet Donnchadh MacRae, 9th of Inverinate, the scribe of the Fernaig manuscript.

The MacRaes of Inverinate were well known for their loyalty to the chief (Scottish Gaelic: Caberféidh) of Clan MacKenzie (Scottish Gaelic: Clann Choinnich). In view of their loyal and effective service to the Mackenzie Chiefs, Clan Macrae of Kintail was known as Clan Mackenzie's "shirt of mail."

Despite the sitting Chief's decision to side with the House of Hanover during the Jacobite rising of 1745, however, Clan Macrae was divided. A number of Macraes are known to have fought for Prince Charles Edward Stuart under George Mackenzie. Others joined the government's Independent Highland Companies under Captain Colin Mackenzie. In June 1746, the Mackenzie Company at Shiramore in Badenoch had over sixty Macraes, including an Ensign John MacRae.

In interviews with John Lorne Campbell, Barra seanchaidh John The Coddy MacPherson recalled that Clan Macrae of Kintail were famous throughout Scotland for cooking high quality moonshine, or "peatreek" in Scots, from illegal pot stills (Scottish Gaelic: poit dhubh).

As a member of the minor Scottish gentry, MacRae lived a very privileged life compared with the vast majority of his fellow Gaels following the Battle of Culloden in 1746. MacRae served Kenneth Mackenzie, Chief of Clan MacKenzie, as a ground-officer, deer stalker, and forester throughout Kintail and Lochalsh. This was a very comfortable and well-paid position. Furthermore, MacRae's wit made him so popular among both the Scottish nobility (Scottish Gaelic: flath) and commons that no formal dress ball or village ceilidh was considered complete without his presence.

== Decision to emigrate ==
Around 1773, MacRae received a letter encouraging him to emigrate from an t-Urr. Iain Beutan (Rev. John Bethune), a native of Glenelg and minister of the Barbecue Presbyterian Church in would later become Harnett County, in the Colony of North Carolina. Although it is not known what Rev. Beutan's letter said, it is considered likely by literary scholars that he mentioned the abundance of wild game in the New World.

In Scottish culture, deer hunting was a traditional pastime for both nobles and warriors and eating fish or seafood was considered a sign a low birth or status. By this time, however, hunting was being increasingly treated as poaching by the Anglo-Scottish landlords. Iain mac Mhurchaidh had already composed a poem complaining that his hunting rights were being restricted and, for this and many other reasons, he decided on taking the minister's advice and emigrating to North Carolina.

As news spread of Iain Mac Mhuirchaidh's plans, his friends and relations were reportedly very distressed. Three noblemen with massive holdings in Ross-shire lavishly entertained MacRae at dinner and offered him any farm on their estates he desired, but to no avail.

MacRae, however, had no intention of going alone and composed many Gaelic poems and songs in which he urged his friends and relations to join him. In those poems, like many other Gaelic poets of the era who favored voluntary emigration, MacRae complained that warriors were no longer valued and that greed had come to mean more to the Chiefs and the Tacksmen than family or clan ties. Iain mac Mhurchaidh always concluded his poems by arguing that the Gaels would do well to emigrate to the New World and abandon such a corrupted nobility.

In one such poem, he bade farewell to his fellow Gaels in Glen Cannich and Strathglass, whom he highly praised, according to Colin Chisholm, for, "their well known hospitality and convivial habits; [and] the musical sweetness and modest demeanor of their matrons and maidens, uncontaminated by modern fashions and frivolities."

After making the final arrangements for his departure, Iain hosted the Captain of the emigrant ship to dinner at his house. According to an 1882 article in The Celtic Monthly, "His guest, seeing his table better provided with good things than was the ordinary lot of common emigrants, enquired of his host if he was always able to have such a spread for himself. Being answered in the affirmative, the captain told the bard that he would not be able to have such in America and, at the same time, advised him to stay at home. His wife and many of his friends he was leaving behind him also urged him to do this. Being undecided as to what in the circumstances, he should do, his friend Ardintoul pointed out to him that, if he turned home after all that he had said, sang, and done, he would live despised ever after as a weak-minded coward. The thought of being held dishonoured and a coward decided the matter."

== Revolutionary War Poet ==
Iain mac Mhuirchaidh arrived in North Carolina in 1774. By 1775, he had amassed enough wealth to purchase 150 acres along McLendons Creek, in what is now Moore County.

Following his emigration Iain mac Mhuirchaidh is believed by some scholars to have composed the Gaelic lullaby Dèan cadalan sàmhach, a chuilean a rùin ("Go to sleep peacefully, little beloved one").

Marcus Tanner has called Iain mac Mhurchaidh's arrival in the New World, "a real case of bad timing", as he, "had hardly gotten himself established before he was fighting his fellow Americans."

At the beginning of the American Revolution Allan Maclean of Torloisk dispatched Brigadier General Donald MacDonald and Major Alexander MacLean of the 84th Regiment of Foot to North Carolina on a covert mission. After successfully bluffing their way through an interrogation by the North Carolina Committee of Safety, both British officers arrived in the Cape Fear Valley and issued an appeal to all Scottish Gaels in the Colony to take up arms on behalf of the Loyalist cause. Proclamations were sent out demanding that, "all the King's loyal subjects... repair to the King's Royal Standard, at Cross Creek ... to join the King's Army; otherwise, they must expect to fall under the melancholy consequences of a declared rebellion, and expose themselves to the just resentment of an injured, though gracious Sovereign." The latter statement would have been understood by North Carolina Highlanders as a threat that those who refused military service would be treated to both the land confiscations and the "arbitrary and malicious violence" used in the aftermath of the Battle of Culloden, which is still referred to in the Highlands and Islands as Bliadhna nan Creach ("The Year of the Pillaging").

Beginning what would later be dubbed "The Insurrection of Clan Donald", on 1 February 1776, Brigadier General MacDonald raised the Royal Standard in the Public Square of Cross Creek. Nightly balls were held and all other means were used to instill the military spirit. Meanwhile, Iain mac Mhuirchaidh was one of the first North Carolina Gaels to enlist.

Even though Loyalist Gaels in North Carolina were often accused at the time accused of ingratitude by their Patriot neighbors, according Michael Newton, they themselves felt very differently; "Gaelic poetry of the Jacobite period discussed the conflict in the following terms: the ultimate reason for taking action is consistently presented as a moral imperative – (Scottish Gaelic: còir), 'right, what one should do', (Scottish Gaelic: ceart) 'what is right, just', and (Scottish Gaelic: dlighe) 'what is due (to and from one)' being the operative terms. The Gaelic worldview, and sense of right and wrong, had been forged during centuries of life in a kin-based society with a strong sense of hereditary right and loyalty to leadership."

When Loyalist forces gathered at Cross Creek on 15 February 1776, they numbered about 3,500 men. According to John Patterson MacLean, "When the day came, the Highlanders were seen coming from near and from far, from the wide plantations on the river bottoms, and from the rude cabins in the depths of the lonely pine forests, with broadswords at their side, in tartan garments and feather bonnet, and keeping step to the shrill music of the bag-pipe. There came, first of all, Clan MacDonald with Clan MacLeod near at hand, with lesser numbers of Clan MacKenzie, Clan Macrae, Clan MacLean, Clan MacKay, Clan MacLachlan, and still others – variously estimated at fifteen hundred to three thousand, including about two hundred others, principally Regulators. However, all who were capable of bearing arms did not respond to the summons, for some would not engage in a cause where their traditions and affections had no part. Many of them hid in the swamps and in the forests."

According to tradition, as the loyalist Gaels gathered around the Royal Standard in the Public Square of Cross Creek, the formerly Jacobite heroine Flora MacDonald, "made to them an address in their own Gaelic tongue that excited them to the highest pitch of warlike enthusiasm", a tradition known among the Highland clans as a, "brosnachadh-catha" or an, "incitement to battle."

As the Loyalist Gaels marched towards the Atlantic coast, they were closely followed and then expertly ambushed at one of the only crossings of Moore's Creek by equally battle-hardened North Carolina militiamen who, like the Gaels, had also fought in the British Army during the French and Indian War under the command of Colonel James Moore. In response to the ambush, on the early morning of 27 February 1776, Iain mac Mhuirchaidh fought in the famous Highland charge at the Battle of Moore's Creek Bridge and survived to be taken prisoner. His son, Murdo Macrae, fought alongside him and was mortally wounded.

While held with the battle's other Loyalist leaders as a prisoner of war in Philadelphia and feeling a deep sense of regret for ever having emigrated to British North America, Iain mac Mhurchaidh composed the song Tha mi sgìth dhe'n fhòghairt seo ("I am weary of this exile").

As the war continued, however, the storied loyalty of the Scottish Gaels to King George III, built as it was upon belief in the military invincibility of the British Empire, fear of New World land confiscations from those who refused military service, and upon the traditional honor code of the Scottish clans, began cracking far wider than many historians realize. Large numbers of Highland soldiers were deserting their Loyalist regiments and joining the Continental Army. In his diary, Major Iain Dòmhnallach (John MacDonald) of the Maryland Loyalists, describes in considerable detail the lengths to which he had to do to keep his men from defecting to the Patriot side and bringing arsenals of ammunition with them.

Sergeant Donald MacDonald, the son of Brigadier General MacDonald, when asked by General Peter Horry why he abandoned his father's party and joined the Continental Army, explained about the aftermath of Moore's Creek, "Instead of murdering the prisoners as the English had done at Culloden, they treated us with their usual generosity. And now these are the people I love and will fight for as long as I live."

Furthermore, David Stewart of Garth wrote in a post-Battle of Yorktown letter, "I have been told by intelligence officers, who served in the last war, that they found the Highland emigrants more fierce in their animosity of the mother country than even the native Americans."

Iain mac Mhurchaidh accordingly paid a very heavy financial price for his Monarchist beliefs. In 1780, the North Carolina General Assembly taxed his property in Moore County at three times its value. This unjust over-taxation, but, far more importantly, the Highland concept of family honor and the duty to revenge fallen relatives; even at the risk of starting a protracted blood feud; is why the combat death of Iain mac Mhurchaidh's son, Murchadh mac Iain, at the 1776 Battle of Moore's Creek Bridge must be taken as the main explanation for the transplanted Kintail Bard's refusal to give up the fight.

== Death ==
Iain mac Mhurchaidh must have been either released or else have escaped from captivity in Philadelphia, because, according to tradition, he fought again as a Loyalist soldier under the command of Major Patrick Ferguson and Captain Abraham de Peyster on 7 October 1780, at the Battle of King's Mountain, which has since been described as "the war's largest all-American fight".

Even though this battle has traditionally, "been characterized as a confrontation between Loyalist Highlanders and Scotch-Irish revolutionaries", there were in reality many native Gaelic-speakers fighting on both sides. According to one source, Iain mac Mhurchaidh, in a revival of, "the diplomatic immunity of the ancient Celtic bards", walked between the opposing armies during the battle and, in an attempt to convert his fellow Gaels among the Patriot militia and the Overmountain Men to the Loyalist cause, he sang the song, Nam faighte làmh-an-uachdar air luchd nan còta ruadha ("Even if the upper hand were gained against the Redcoats").

In the poem, which is believed to have cost its singer very dearly, Iain mac Mhurchaidh called the Declaration of Independence and the American Revolution against King George III every bit as unnatural as disrespect against one's earthly or heavenly father. The Bard also threatened that Patriots who did not submit to the British monarchy would be treated like both real and suspected Jacobites throughout the Highlands and Islands had been treated during the infamous "Year of the Pillaging" after the Battle of Culloden in 1746.

Iain mac Mhuirchaidh is believed to have died either during or soon after the Battle of King's Mountain. According to one source, he died in captivity. Other historians believe that he was "probably killed by the American Patriots." According to one tradition, Iain Mac Mhurchaidh, "suffered an excruciating death", at Patriot hands. Still other accounts allege that Iain Mac Mhurchaidh was taken prisoner after the Battle of Kings Mountain, but that he escaped and remained hiding in the forests until after the end of the war. According to these accounts, the Bard lived at least long enough to file for compensation from the British Crown for his lost properties in North Carolina.

== Legacy ==
Following the end of the war, Moore County and many other regions of the new United States which had been mainly settled by Scottish Gaels, were almost depopulated, as Gaelic-speaking Loyalists fled northward, often under extremely brutal conditions, towards what remained of British North America.

Among these so-called "United Empire Loyalist" refugees was Iain mac Mhurchaidh's close friend Rev. Iain Beutan (John Bethune). Like Iain mac Mhurchaidh, Rev. Beutan fought as a Loyalist military chaplain and was taken prisoner following the Battle of Moore's Creek Bridge. Ironically, and despite their former minister's Loyalism, the Gaelic-speaking congregation at the Barbeque Presbyterian Church in Harnett County, North Carolina, was known for the rest of the American Revolution as, "an island of Whigs in a sea of Tories."

After being released in a prisoner exchange and serving as military chaplain to the 84th Regiment of Foot, Rev. Bethune ministered to his fellow Gaels at Montreal, Williamstown, and in the many Canadian Gaelic-speaking settlements in Glengarry County, Ontario. Rev. Bethune is accordingly credited with organizing the first Presbyterian congregations in Canada, where his many descendants include the Academy Award-winning actor Christopher Plummer.

According to Marcus Tanner, Iain Mac Mhurchaidh's, "poems were brought back to Scotland years later by others who had learned them." A fellow Loyalist Gael also named John MacRae, who was known in Gaelic as Iain mac a’ Ghobha, who lost his arm in combat during the American Revolution, is particularly credited with memorizing Iain mac Mhurchaidh's poems and bringing them back to his native district of Kintail, in Scotland.

According to Michael Newton, the memory of Iain mac Mhurchaidh was often invoked for decades after his death by fellow Gaels in both Scotland and Canada, particularly in response to the mass evictions known as the Highland Clearances. Iain mac Mhurchaidh was accordingly mentioned to contrast the post-Culloden loyalty of Highland soldiers to the British royal family, as well as their many sufferings and sacrifices, with what was seen as the gross ingratitude that both His Majesty's Government and the Anglo-Scottish landlords had subsequently shown towards Highland military veterans and their families.

Meanwhile, despite the post-Revolutionary War redirection of emigration by the Gaels from Scotland to Canada, a large Gàidhealtachd continued to exist in North Carolina, from whence many pioneer families carried Family Bibles, Metrical Psalmbooks, and copies of the Westminster Shorter Catechism in Scottish Gaelic with them as they migrated West.

According to Michael Newton, "Many Highlanders remained in North Carolina, certainly enough to retain a distinctive community that continued to thrive and speak Gaelic. In addition, Patrick Campbell mentions Highlanders from Appin coming to North Carolina in 1791, and there is evidence of further migrations from 1803 to 1820. A number of Gaelic colonists who had settled in the Caribbean left for the United States, usually the Carolinas, in the 1820s."

Unlike in Nova Scotia, however, where a distinctive Canadian dialect of Scottish Gaelic continues to be both spoken and written, the North Carolina Gàidhealtachd only survived, according to Marcus Tanner, "until it was well and truly disrupted", by the American Civil War. This is why, even though it is a certainty that Patriot war poetry in Gaelic did exist and that other local Gaels were similarly inspired to rise up and fight for the Continental Army by Patriot Bards, unlike in Canada, almost nothing was collected or written down from the local oral tradition before the post-Civil War language shift that caused the North Carolina dialect of Gaelic to die out.

It is accordingly deeply ironic that one of the only surviving pro-Patriot Gaelic poems from the American Revolution was composed, not in the United States, but in Scotland. The Patriot Bard skillfully invokes the two traditional attributes of an unworthy Scottish clan chief, raising the clan's rent needlessly and spending all the money on overpriced luxuries for himself, and then lays those very attributes at the doors of both the Scottish nobility and King George III.

The poem, The Lament of the North was composed in 1783, the year that saw both the end of the American Revolution and the beginning of the Highland Clearances in the poet's native Inverness-shire. The author was Cionneach mac Cionnich (Kenneth MacKenzie) (1758–1837), a bard from Clan MacKenzie who was born at Castle Leather near Inverness and who died at Fermoy, County Cork, Ireland. In the poem, Cionneach mac Cionnich reviles the Scottish clan chiefs for becoming absentee landlords, for both rackrenting and evicting their clansmen en masse in favor of sheep, and for "spending their wealth uselessly", in London. He accuses King George III both of tyranny, excessive greed, spending taxpayers money on foppish clothes, and of steering the ship of state into shipwreck. MacCionnich also argues that truth is on the side of George Washington and the Continental Army and that the Gaels would do well to emigrate from the Highlands and Islands to the United States before the King and the landlords take every farthing they have left. The poem appeared in MacKenzie's poetry collection, Òrain Ghaidhealach, agus Bearla air an eadar-theangacha.

More recently, June Callwood wrote critically of the legacy of Canada's foundation by Loyalist refugees, whose numbers may have included Iain Mac Mhurchaidh. The legacy of the United Empire Loyalists, who preferred order to liberty and George III to George Washington, is why modern Canadian people, according to Callwood, are allegedly willing to accept and even loudly defend a level of police misconduct and government infringement upon their civil liberties that would be unthinkable in American culture. Canadians who disagree are left with only two choices, "The State or the United States."

For this and other reasons, many people from Canadian Gaelic-speaking communities, ironically including many descendants of Loyalists, have permanently crossed the border and made new lives in the United States. For example, after joining the mass migration from Atlantic Canada to the American city of Boston, Massachusetts and it's suburbs during the late 19th and early 20th-century, which one contemporary writer compared to a gold rush, Mrs. Catherine MacInnes from Cape Breton made and published a Scottish Gaelic literary translation of the lyrics to The Star Spangled Banner.

After recording Gaelic songs in Depression era Nova Scotia with his wife, American ethnomusicologist Margaret Fay Shaw, John Lorne Campbell wrote in the book Songs Remembered in Exile, that he considered the Canadian government foolish to continue encouraging Highland Scottish immigration, as Scottish Canadian communities were unable to keep their young people from emigrating to the United States.

Also, according to Michael Newton, "Professor Catrìona Persons of St Francis Xavier University of Antigonish presented a talk about a recently discovered item to the International Celtic Congress in Edinburgh in 1994. The four verse song seems to have been composed in North Carolina about the time of the Civil War and mentions the dance the Reel of Tulloch, suggesting that the members of the Highland community were still engaged in traditional Gaelic song and dance to some degree at that time."

Today, local pride in the Scottish Highland heritage of local pioneers remains very common in North Carolina. One of North America's largest Highland games events, the Grandfather Mountain Highland Games, are held there every year and draw in visitors from all over the world. The Grandfather Mountain games have been called "the best" such event in the United States because of the spectacular landscape and the large number of people who attend in kilts and other regalia of the Scottish clans. It is also widely considered to be the largest "gathering of clans" in North America, as more family lines are represented there than any other similar event.
