= Cionneach mac Cionnich =

Coinneach Mac'Coinnich (Kenneth Mackenzie) (1762–1819) was a Scottish Gaelic language poet, sailor, and military officer during the 18th and early 19th centuries.

== Life ==
Mackenzie was born into Clan MacKenzie at Castle Leather (Scottish Gaelic: Caisteal Leathoir) near Inverness, to Kenneth McKenzie, a tenant farmer, and his wife Isobel Denoon. His parents were reasonably well off and gave him a good education. At the age of 17, he became a sailor's apprentice and, before leaving home, Mackenzie was gifted by his mother with three books; a copy of the Christian Bible in Scottish Gaelic and one volume each of Gaelic poetry by Jacobite Bard Alasdair mac Mhaighstir Alasdair and Whig Bard Duncan Ban MacIntyre. All three volumes influenced him greatly and most of his poetry and songs were composed at sea.

In 1783, the year that saw the end of the American Revolution and the beginning of the Highland Clearances in Inverness-shire, he composed The Lament of the North, the only extant work of war poetry in Gaelic that takes up the Patriot rather than the Loyalist banner and which skillfully invokes the two traditional attributes of an unworthy Scottish clan chief, raising the clan's rent needlessly and spending all the money on overpriced luxuries for himself, and then lays those same qualities at the doors of both the Scottish nobility and King George III. In the poem, Cionneach mac Cionnich denounces the Scottish clan chiefs for becoming absentee landlords, for both rackrenting and evicting their clansmen en masse in favor of sheep farming, and of "spending their wealth uselessly", in London. He accuses King George III both of tyranny and of steering the ship of state into shipwreck. MacCionnich also argues that truth is on the side of George Washington and the Continental Army and that the Gaels would do well to emigrate from the Highlands and Islands to the United States before the King and the landlords take every farthing they have left.

In 1789, the same year as the French Revolution, Mac'Coinnich, returned from the sea and began travelling in his native district seeking subscriptions that would enable him to publish the first book of his poetry. After being rejected and turned away from the door by Alexander MacIntosh of Canntra Dùn, Mac'Coinnich composed the satire Aoir do dh'Alastair Mac an Tòisich, whose publication was later credited with causing the Tacksman's sudden death. Kenneth Mackenzie's poetry collection, Òrain Ghaidhealach, agus Bearla air an eadar-theangacha, consisting of 55 original poems and four literary translations, and which was first published in Edinburgh in 1792.

In 1795, through the influence of both the Earl of Buchan and Lord Seaforth, he became a commissioned officer in either the 2nd Battalion, Rothsay and Caithness Fencibles, Highland Fencible Corps, under the command of Sir John Sinclair, 1st Baronet or the 78th Highlanders. He allegedly served in combat during the Irish rebellion of 1798. He reached the rank of lieutenant captain in 1801 and when the battalion disbanded in 1802 he probably retired from military service.

After leaving the British Army, on half pay as an Adjutant, he was became the postmaster of Fermoy, County Cork, from which he continued to correspond with his brother, James Mackenzie, who lived at 26 Castle Street, in Inverness.

According to literary scholar John Mackenzie, "He indulged in the genuine hospitality of his heart, always keep an open door and a spread table, and literally caressing such of his countryman as chance or business led in his way. We have conversed with an old veteran who partook of his liberality so late as the year 1837."

Mackenzie died at Fermoy, County Cork, Ireland, on 20th February 1819.

== Legacy ==
According to literary scholar of Scottish Gaelic literature Ronald Black, John MacKenzie, who considered only four or five of Kenneth Mackenzie's poems to "have stepped beyond the confines of mediocrity", also accused Kenneth MacKenzie of having been a homosexual. According to Black, however, Kenneth MacKenzie's published works, shows, "abundant evidence of a heterosexual appetite and much verse of high quality". In 1933, literary scholar Angus MacLeod praised Kenneth Mackenzie's poetry of life at sea and compared them to Gaelic national poet Alasdair Mac Mhaighstir Alasdair's immortal Birlinn Chlann Raghnaill, which describes the voyage of a Highland war galley across the Irish Sea from South Uist to Carrickfergus. This comparison was, according to Ronald Black, "Praise indeed, which Kenneth Mackenzie would have savoured."
