= Ewen MacLachlan =

Scottish scholar and poet (1775–1822)

Ewen MacLachlan (Gaelic: Eòghann MacLachlainn) (1775–1822) was a Scottish scholar and poet. He is noted for his translations of ancient Classical literature into Gaelic, for his own Gaelic verse, and for his contribution to Gaelic dictionaries.

MacLachlan is considered one of the most important figures in the preservation of Gaelic as a written language and written literature.

== Life ==
MacLachlan was born in Lochaber, and educated at Aberdeen University. He was librarian to University and Kings College, Aberdeen from 1800–1818, and headmaster of Aberdeen grammar school from 1810–1822. He translated the first eight books of Homer's Iliad into Gaelic. He also composed and published his own Gaelic Attempts in Verse (1807) and Metrical Effusions (1816), and contributed greatly to the 1828 Gaelic–English Dictionary.

== Ionad Eòghainn MhicLachlainn (The National Centre for Gaelic Translation) ==
In 2021, Ionad Eòghainn MhicLachlainn (The National Centre for Gaelic Translation) was founded at the University of Aberdeen, to promote and enhance translation out of and into Gaelic, and was named in MacLachlan's honour.

== See also ==
- Scottish Gaelic literature
- Scottish Gaelic
