= Dùn Aluinn =

Dùn-Àluinn (1912) by Iain MacCormaic (1860–1947) was the first full-length novel in Scottish Gaelic literature. It was first published as a weekly serial in The People's Journal from May to September 1910. The name is sometimes anglicised as Dunaline.

It was closely followed by Angus Robertson's An t-Ogha Mòr, which had actually been serialised prior to Dun Aluinn's publication, and so vies for the position of first novel.

MacCormaic, a native of Mull, published in magazines sponsored by Ruaraidh Erskine. Prior to the novel, he had published collections of short stories and a novella, Gu’n Tug i Spéis do’n Armunn, in 1908.

== Plot summary ==
The novel is about the horror of the Highland Clearances, and the heir of a despotic landlord, Cailean Og, who is disinherited. The most interesting character is the Church of Scotland minister who gives a sermon about social rights. For a novel of its period, it is fairly cosmopolitan, and the action ranges to locations as exotic as gold mines in New Zealand.

== Reception ==
After publication the novel was reviewed in The Oban Times and by An Comunn Gàidhealach. There were suggestions that the vocabulary used in the novel was local to Mull.
