= Maighread nighean Lachlainn =

18th-century poet

Maighread nighean Lachlainn (born c. 1660) was an eighteenth-century Scottish Gaelic poet from Mull. In her poetry, she mentions the Jacobite risings.

== Poetry ==
- Cha choma leam fhìn co dhiù sin (c. 1698)
- Dh' fhalbh mo chadal a' smaointinn
- Gaoir nam ban Muileach (1716): An Lasair, pp. 60–71.
- Gun d' fhuair mi sgeul 's chan àicheam e
- Mo cheist an Leathanach mòdhar
