= Dòmhnall Ruadh Chorùna =

Scottish poet

Donald MacDonald
- Dòmhnall Ruadh Chorùna
- Born: 9 July 1887; Claddach Baleshare, North Uist, Scotland
- Died: 13 August 1967 (aged 80); Lochmaddy, Scotland
- Occupation: Stonemason
- Writing career
- Language: Scottish Gaelic
- Genres: War poetry, Gaelic poetry
- Notable work: An Eala Bhàn

Dòmhnall Ruadh Chorùna (Red Donald of Coruna; 9 July 1887 – 13 August 1967), legally Donald MacDonald or Dòmhnall MacDhòmhnaill, was a Scottish Gaelic bard, North Uist stonemason, and veteran of the First World War. Literary historian Ronald Black has called Dòmhnall Ruadh, "The Voice of the Trenches."

He wrote An Eala Bhàn ("The White Swan"), which he composed after being wounded in action on a mission in no man's land during the Battle of the Somme. An Eala Bhàn is a love song addressed to Magaidh NicLeòid of Lochmaddy, the woman whom he hoped to marry. In recent years, it has been recorded by artists as diverse as Calum Kennedy, Donnie Munro, Capercaillie, and Julie Fowlis.

== Family background ==
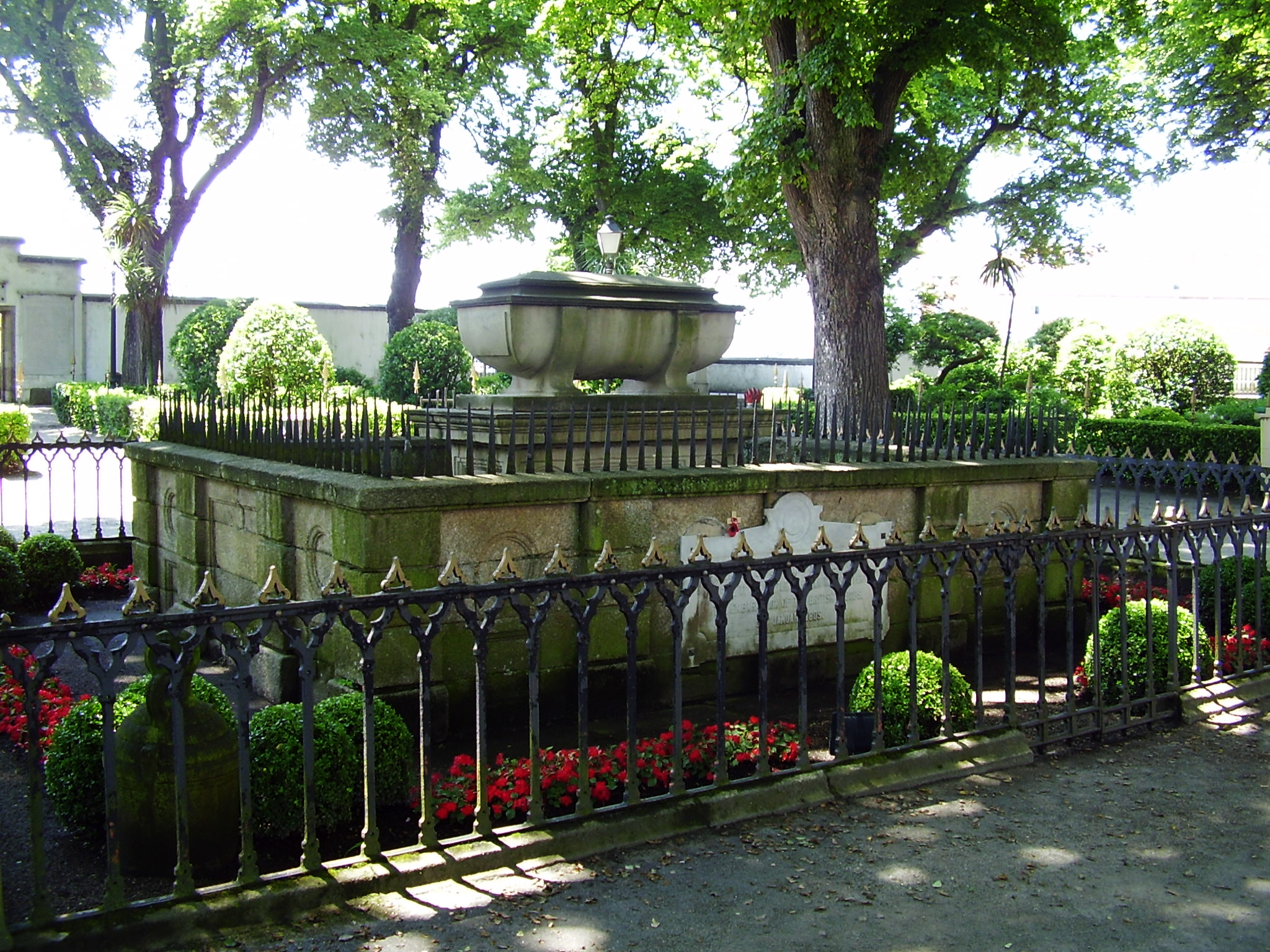
Tomb of Sir John Moore, La Coruña.

When the poet was young, he was often told stories about the experiences of his maternal great-grandparents during the Napoleonic Wars.

According to the family's oral tradition, the bard's great-grandmother, Mór Chaimbeul ("Marion Campbell") of Skye, had given a last drink of water to Sir John Moore moments before he was fatally wounded at the Battle of Corunna in 1809. At the moment when Moore was wounded, Marion Campbell was holding the stirrup of his horse, was thrown up into the air, and landed on her back. According to Dòmhnall Ruadh, his great-grandmother never recovered from the ensuing injury and it caused her to die young.

Marion lost her first husband a member of Clan MacLeod of Dunvegan, at the Battle of Corunna as well. She then began living with another soldier who had fought in the Battle named Domhnall mac Mhurchaidh 'ic Iain 'ic Mhurchaidh ("Donald Ferguson") (1780–1845), moved with him to his native North Uist, and eventually married him there.

In later years, a Gaelic rhyme about Marion became popular in North Uist:

"Blàr mòr Chorùna, 1809 –
Chaidh Mòr mhòr Chorùna
A-null dhan an Fhraing"

"The big Battle of Corunna, 1809 –
Big Marion of Corunna
Went over to France."

After they arrived in North Uist, the local tacksman of the island's landlord, the Chief of Clan MacDonald of Sleat, granted Donald and Marion Ferguson a croft in the township of Claddach Baleshare. Unfortunately, Donald and Marion Ferguson had only girls, fell into arrears, and were evicted from their croft. The tacksman then moved the Fergusons into another croft in the same district, where Donald built a house that still stands. Due to the Fergusons' many stories about their experiences in the wars, their home became one of the most popular ceilidh houses on the island.

Dòmhnall Ruadh later said of Donald Ferguson, "He was the only soldier on the island except for one other over Sollas way by the name of Aonghas Moireasdan, and he got this place where I am today. So many visitors came to call in the evenings to get the tales of Corunna and India from him and the lads would say to each other, 'Let's go over tonight to Corùna to hear the stories.' And the name Corùna stuck to this day and will continue as long as the sun sails westwards."

In commenting on the bard's family history, Ronald Black has written, "As Fred Macauley points out, the poet's background thus contained a certain glorification of war which was to expire forever in the mud of France."

== Early life ==
Dòmhnall Ruadh Corùna was born in the house built by his maternal great-grandfather on 9 July 1887. There were three other children in his family, two boys and a girl.

His mother, Flòraidh Fhionnghuala Dhòmhnaill 'ic Mhurchaidh 'ic Iain 'ic Mhurchaidh, worked as a domestic servant. Her father, Dòmhnall mac Ailein 'ic Chaluim, is known to have been both a merchant seaman and a Gaelic poet. Dòmhnall Mac Ailein's sister, Maighread nighean Ailein, was the composer of the Gaelic love song, Ille dhuinn, is toil leam thu ("Brown-Haired Lad, I'm Fond of You"). For this reason, Ronald Black has written, "Poetry was in Dòmhnall Ruadh's blood."

The poet's father, Dòmhnall MacDhòmhnaill, worked as a merchant seaman.

Towards the end of his life, Dòmhnall wrote a poem called Smuaintean nam Shean Aois ("Thoughts in Old Age"). Dòmhnall recalled that in his youth he had been very irreligious and that the strict observance of the Christian Sabbath on Presbyterian North Uist was extremely difficult for him to get through every week. This was something that he regretted very deeply in later years.

Dòmhnall briefly attended a district school at Carinish. He would later describe his school days in the poem Òran Nan Sgoilearan ("The Schoolchildren's Song") and how all the students were "hungry, deprived, barefoot, bareheaded".

Due to the 1872 Education Act, only English was tolerated as a medium for education in the schools of the Highlands and Islands. As a result, the bard would never learn to read or write in Scottish Gaelic, and always had to compose letters in English. However, he began composing Gaelic poetry at the age of 13. His mother was reportedly impressed with his abilities and made him promise never to compose scurrilous or satirical verse. Dòmhnall had a very deep respect for his mother and it was a promise he always honoured. This, and the introspection caused by his experiences in World War I, sets him apart from other Scottish Gaelic poets.

As he later recalled in his war poem Che b' e Gunna mo Nàmhaid ("It Was Not My Enemy's Gun"), a young Dòmhnall was fond of roaming the countryside of North Uist with a muzzle-loading musket, which he used for poaching game birds and red deer, while carefully trying to avoid the factors of the Anglo-Scottish Campbell-Orde family, who had been the widely hated landlords of North Uist since buying the island in 1855.

In the same poem, however, Dòmhnall recalled,

"Is beag a shaoilinn an uair ud
Gu robh 'n cruas seo gam ionnsaigh.
'S e gaol na mosgaid a dh'fhàg
Fo ghlas-làmh aig a' Chrùn mi,
An gaol a thug mi nam òige
A bhith 'n còmhnaidh ga stiùreadh."

"Little did I guess then
That this hardship was ahead.
It was my love for the musket
That left me fettered to the Crown,
The fascination from my youth
Of aiming it."

== World War I ==
Dòmhnall Ruadh joined the Inverness-shire unit of the King's Militia when he was seventeen. On the outbreak of World War I in 1914, he joined the Queen's Own Cameron Highlanders and served under the command of Colonel Donald Walter Cameron of Lochiel. Following combat training at Hunstanton, Norfolk, he was assigned to the regiment's 7th Service Battalion and landed in July 1915 at Boulogne-sur-Mer as part of the 44th Brigade in the 15th (Scottish) Division. He was sent into active service in the trench warfare of the Western Front.

=== Active service ===
Dòmhnall Ruadh Chorùna's battalion first saw combat on September 25, 1915; the first day of the Battle of Loos. One of the regimental bagpipers who led the Cameron Highlanders over the top was Berneray-born bush poet Iain Eairdsidh MacAsgaill, who is also an important figure in modern Scottish Gaelic literature.

On the first day, the 15th (Scottish) Division captured the village of Loos-en-Gohelle and Hill 70. Theirs was the furthest advance by any of the six British divisions involved in the first day of the battle, but it could not be exploited by the Allied forces.

Unlike more famous war poets like Wilfred Owen, Siegfried Sassoon, and Charles Sorley, Dòmhnall Ruadh Chorùna believed himself to be fighting a just war against a truly terrible enemy.

During his baptism of fire at the Battle of Loos, Dòmhnall experienced what he always thought was one of the first uses of poison gas by the Imperial German Army on the Western Front. In his poem Òran a' Phuinnsein ("The Song of the Poison"), he recalled how terrible the effects of the gas were and how he and his fellow soldiers had no defence against it. Dòmhnall concluded the poem by saying that he wished he could summon fire from heaven, like that which fell upon Sodom and Gomorrah, to also fall upon the German Empire and the German people to melt both without mercy.

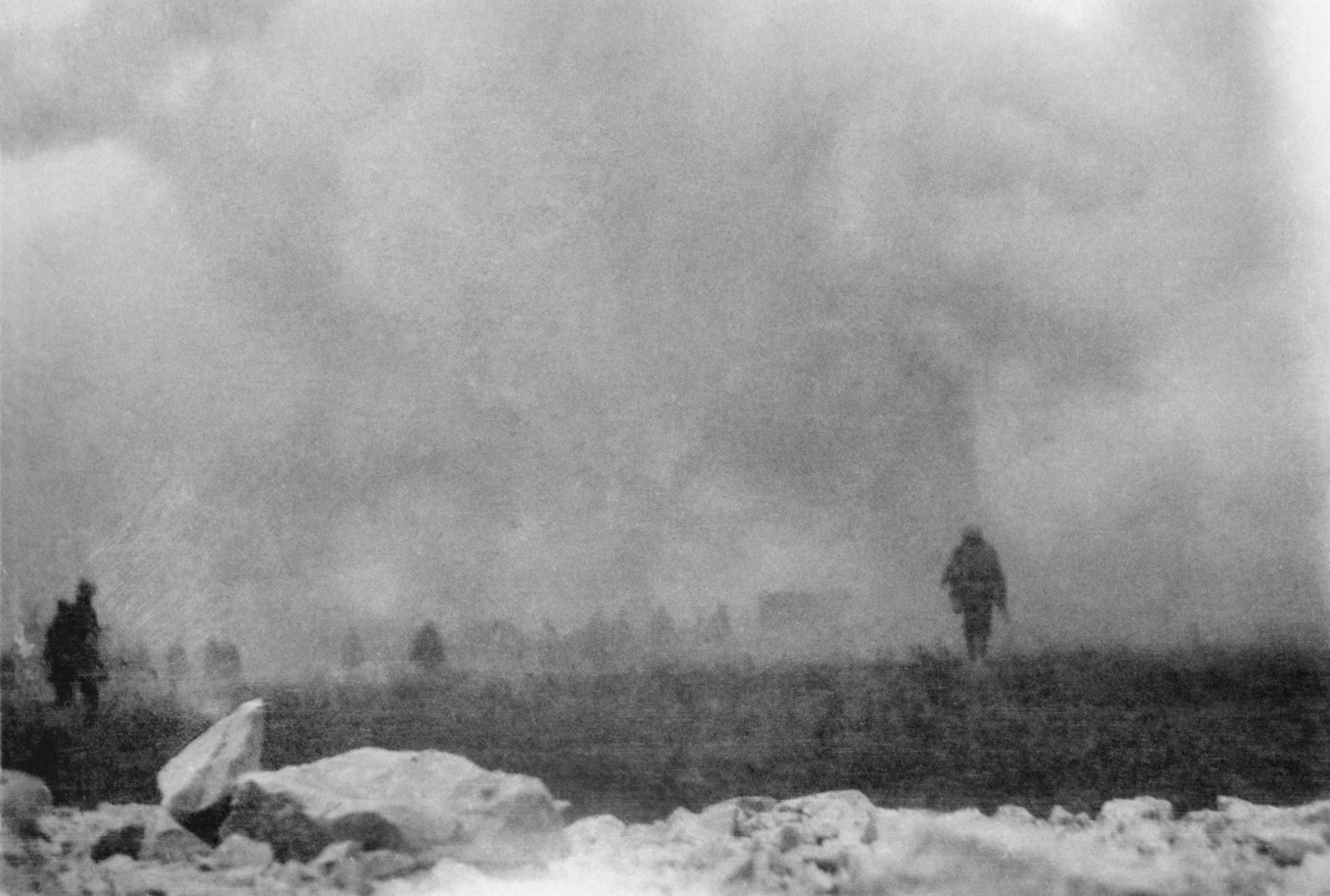
British infantry advancing through gas at Loos, 25 September 1915

Unbeknownst to Dòmhnall, he was actually describing the first use of poison gas by the British Army on the Western Front and one of the most disastrous friendly fire incidents of the First World War. On the first day of the Battle of Loos, chlorine gas, codenamed Red Star, was deployed (140 tons) and aimed at the German Sixth Army's positions on the Hohenzollern Redoubt. The wind proved fickle and the gas either lingered in no man's land or blew right back into British trenches. Escalating the situation, an extremely well-aimed and retaliatory artillery barrage resulted in German shells exploding upon the unused gas cylinders and releasing even more poison gas throughout British lines. The use of poison gas during the Battle of Loos caused 10 deaths and at least 2,000 cases of serious injury to British soldiers. The use of poison gas by all sides violated the 1899 Hague Declaration Concerning Asphyxiating Gases and the 1907 Hague Convention on Land Warfare.

In his poem Tha Mi Duilich, Cianail, Duilich ("I am Sad, Lamenting, and Full of Sorrow") Dòmhnall expresses grief for his friends who have fallen. He recalls their ceilidhs and how they sang Gaelic songs together. He adds that now they are now torn to pieces, lying in no man's land, or buried beneath crosses. Then, Dòmhnall speaks of the Resurrection of Jesus Christ and how one day all the men who fell in the war will also arise and be reunited with their loved ones. Dòmhnall concluded, however, by saying that as long as he lives, the images of his fallen friends and the horrors of war will be forever burned into his heart and his vision.

In the poem Dh'fhalbh na Gillean Grinn ("Off Went the Handsome Lads"), Dòmhnall describes both the exhilaration and the rage of going on a Highland charge against German trenches, the hatred he would feel for the enemy when seeing his friends fall, and the extreme satisfaction he would feel only moments later, while overrunning the enemy's trench and killing many German soldiers in close combat. The poem ends, however, with Dòmhnall and his fellow soldiers being awakened to grief, as their officers as for and then take down the name of the enormous number of Cameron Highlanders who were killed during the same attack.

In his poem Aisling an t-Saighdeir ("The Soldier's Dream"), Dòmhnall Ruadh recalls seeing a full grown red deer stag in the rush-covered glens north of Locheport and how he scrambled over rocks and banks trying to get a clear shot at the animal. Dòmhnall slowly took aim and ignited the gunpowder with a spark, only to find that the stag was gone. He had been replaced by Dòmhnall's captain shouting retreat, as German Stormtroopers had swept behind the Cameron Highlanders and were about to cut off all opportunity to escape. Dòmhnall recalled that he had awakened not a moment too soon and that he barely swam out of "the net" before the Germans "pulled it together." Some members of his unit, however, were not so lucky and were taken away as POWs to camps in Germany.

In the late autumn of 1916, while serving at the Battle of the Somme, Dòmhnall Ruadh received orders from his captain to take up a position in no man's land, fifty yards forward of the Cameron Highlanders' trench and twenty yards from a bridge, which was being worked on by a bomb squad commanded by an Irish NCO named Corporal Donnelly.

Soon after taking his place in a shell hole, Dòmhnall found himself in the midst of an artillery barrage. The first shell hit the parapet of the bridge and exploded. The next two shells landed much closer to Dòmhnall's position, blew him up into the air, and knocked him unconscious. One of Dòmhnall's closest friends, Ruairidh MacLeòid from Howmore in South Uist, volunteered to go out in no man's land to look for him, but soon returned in tears, saying that Dòmhnall had been killed in the barrage.

Dòmhnall Ruadh remained unconscious in the shell hole for three hours before he began coming to. Then, as his eyesight began to return, he saw the ruins of the bridge and remembered where he was. He then crawled out of the shell hole and sat down on the edge of it. At that moment, a German sniper opened fire on Dòmhnall from close range.

The sniper's second shot hit its mark and Dòmhnall slid feet first back into the shell hole. As he examined his injuries, Dòmhnall realized that he had been wounded in the side by shrapnel and that the sniper had shot him through his arm, which was hanging limp.

Dòmhnall waited inside the shell hole until he was certain that the sniper had stopped watching him. By then, the sun had risen high.

He later recalled, "Anyway, I was able to crawl, to swim along the ground very cautiously all the way until I came in sight of the boys. And then they then began to shout to me to take it easy and keep down, until I tumbled into the trench where they were, and I was there until they got ahold of stretcher-bearers. My condition improved then and I was reasonably comfortable. I spent a fortnight back at base before they risked sending me back to England, I was so ill."

Dòmhnall would later recall that, soon after his removal from the firing line, his close friend Ruairidh MacLeòid was killed in action.

=== An Eala Bhàn ===
While recovering from his injuries, Dòmhnall composed the love song An Eala Bhàn ("The White Swan") which he addressed to Magaidh NicLeòid, who was also called Magaidh Raghnaill Shaighdear ("Maggie, the Daughter of Ranald the Soldier"), of Lochmaddy in North Uist, the woman whom he hoped to marry. It is the best known of Dòmhnall's songs and poems, defined as a cianalas-style lament for his lover and homeland.

According to Fred Macauley, "As happens to many other songs in the oral tradition, it is seldom sung as the bard composed it. The words have changed over the years, the name is no longer Maggie and even the air is not original. 'They've spoiled it in Harris,' he used to say." In response to how other Gaelic singers rendered his song, Dòmhnall commented "They spoiled that song. There is very little in it today of what I composed. The girl in the song today is called Màiri, but the one I made the song for was Magaidh – Magaidh NicLeòid from Lochmaddy."

Like other Scottish Gaelic and Welsh poetry from World War I, the song expresses the futility and human destruction inherent in war.

=== Return to duty ===
Despite recovering from his injuries, Dòmhnall Ruadh was ruled unfit to return to active service and spent the remainder of the war in the West Riding Field Regiment. Despite what regulations said, however, he continued to wear his Cameron's cap badge. While serving behind the lines during the 1918 Spring Offensive, Dòmhnall had a brief reunion with his old battalion, which inspired him to compose the poem Na Camshronaich San Fhraing ("The Camerons in France").

== Later life ==
=== Changed Days ===
According to John A. Macpherson, "After the war, Dòmhnall Ruadh returned home to Corùna, but although he was thankful to be alive, he was, like most other returning soldiers, disillusioned. The land which they had been promised was as securely held by the landlords as it had ever been, and so were the hunting and fishing rights."

According to Bill Lawson, in some parts of North Uist, land raids took place, as veterans of the Great War attempted to violently seize better crofts from men who had stayed at home. In response, the Campbell-Orde family chose to press full criminal charges against the raiders. In the aftermath, however, a sympathetic Member of Parliament arranged for the large tacksman's farm on the west of North Uist, which includes some of the best land on the island, to be bought out by the Congested Districts Board and divided into crofts.

According to Fred Macauley, "despite the love," that Dòmhnall and Magaidh NicLeòid, "had for each other, they never married. He himself never mentioned what came between them, but there is a tradition that Maggie's father disapproved and actually forbade the marriage."

In 1922, Dòmhnall married Annie MacDonald (Anna Ruairidh 'ic Nèill, 1890–1971).

He later recalled, "I was quite as happy and never regretted it. I got Ann MacDonald instead. We have been together for almost 40 years and we are as happy together today as we were the first day, in a lovely little warm home, clean and tidy, needing nothing but what we cannot have – health and youth."

Dòmhnall and Annie had two children, Mary and Calum, both of whom died in 1965.

According to John A. Macpherson, "He took up the craft of a stone-mason, as many crofters were building new houses, and he was a diligent worker and good walker, often walking twenty miles to the site of a new house. Between the two world wars he built more than thirty houses, and there is hardly a township in Uist without evidence of his skills."

Despite this, the years after the Great War were very empty and there was very little work. As a result, the memory of those who emigrated to Canada or the United States is still very present on North Uist.

Many years later, Dòmhnall would express his feelings about those years in the poem, Caochladh Suigheachadh na Duthcha ("Changed Days"). He recalled the poverty of his youth and how he and his fellow Scottish Gaels went to war and frustrated the Kaiser's war aims at a truly unspeakable cost in lives. Meanwhile, the Anglo-Scottish landlords of the Highlands and Islands stayed home and got richer. He recalled how after the war there was no work and how the Gaels emigrated from Scotland to all corners of the world. For those who stayed, there was no food except what was grown and ground by hand and supplemented by occasional discreet defiance of the landlords' bans on hunting and fishing.

Dòmhnall used to often say of those years, "If it weren't for the gun and what I poached, it would have been dire poverty."

In his poem Dhan Gàidhlig ("For Gaelic"), Dòmhnall urged his fellow Gaels to "forget English", saying he had no use for it. He urged his listeners to remember their warrior ancestors from the Scottish clans, who never gave way upon the battlefield while there was still a head on their shoulders. Dòmhmnall compared the Scottish Gaelic language to a tree that had lost its branches and leaves. But he said that if people were to dig and weed around its base, the tree would grow again and spread its leaves and branches. Dòmhnall expressed the hope that the descendants of the Gaels who were evicted during the Highland Clearances would return from around the world to hear from those who had stayed how heartlessly the landlords treated their ancestors. Dòmhnall expressed a vision of the Scottish Gaeldom prosperous and teeming with children and how sheep, with which the landlords replaced those whom they evicted, would be replaced with Highland cattle. Dòmhnall concluded by predicting that the women in the milking fold will sing Gaelic songs and recite Gaelic poems as they work.

=== Second World War ===
Upon the outbreak of the Second World War in September 1939, Dòmhnall composed the poem Òran dhan Dara Chogaidh ("A Song for World War II"). In the poem, Dòmhnall urged the young Scottish Gaels who were going to war to not be afraid and that victory over Adolf Hitler and Nazi Germany would come before October.

On 16 November 1939 the British merchant ship S.S. Arlington Court was torpedoed and sunk on the Atlantic Ocean by the crew of the German submarine U-43. In the poem Calum Moireasdan an Arlington Court ("Calum Morrison of the Arlington Court"), Dòmhnall paid tribute to the courage shown by one of the survivors, a seventeen year old merchant seaman from Calbost in the Isle of Lewis. Morrison had been the only survivor in his lifeboat who had known how to sail and managed to pilot the lifeboat eastwards for five days, until he and his fellow survivors were rescued at the mouth of the English Channel.

Also during the Second World War, Dòmhnall served in the Home Guard, about which he composed the song Òran a' Home Guard ("The Song of the Home Guard"), which pokes fun at an exercise in which a platoon from North Uist was ordered to simulate retaking Benbecula Airport from the invading Germans.

At the same time, Dòmhnall's son Calum MacDonald served in the Merchant navy, and regularly sailed within sight of North Uist on his travels between the port of Glasgow and the United States. With this in mind, the bard composed the poem Am Fianais Uibhist ("In Sight of Uist").

=== Cold War era ===
According to Ronald Black, "Experiencing a degree of prosperity for the first time in his life after the Second World War, the Voice of the Trenches, as we may call him, became a prolific poet once more, but subsequently suffered a great deal from illness."

On 1 November 1952 the United States successfully detonated "Ivy Mike", the first hydrogen bomb on the island of Elugelab in Enewetak Atoll, in the Marshall Islands, as part of Operation Ivy. On 22 November 1955 the Soviet Union followed suit with the successful detonation of RDS-37, which had been developed by Andrei Sakharov, Vitaly Ginzburg, and Yakov Zel'dovich, at the Semipalatinsk Test Site in northeastern Kazakhstan.

In his poem Òran an H-Bomb ("The Song of the H-Bomb"), Dòmhnall criticized the resulting threat of global nuclear annihilation. He commented how, after an attack on German trenches during World War I, the stretcher bearers would come by sunset to pick up the wounded. But now, due to weapons like the hydrogen bomb, he continued, nothing would be spared, neither man nor beast, neither the beaches nor the mountaintops. Only one or two such bombs would suffice, he said, to completely wipe out the islands where Gaelic is spoken and everyone and everything in them. But Dòmhnall urged his listeners to trust that Jesus Christ, who died on the Cross out of love for the human race, would never permit such a terrible destruction to fall on those whose sins he redeemed through his blood and the wounds in his hands and his side.

On 28 March 1956, when BBC Scotland played a recording of a Gaelic-language ceilidh by the soldiers of the Cameron Highlanders during the Korean War, Dòmhnall Ruadh was listening. He later composed the poem Gillean Chorea ("The Lads in Korea"), in which he declared that the recording had brought back his youth.

In one of his last poems, Chuala Mi 'n Damh Donn sa Mhòintich ("I Heard the Brown Stag on the Moor"), Dòmhnall relates how, old and blind, he heard the cry of a red deer stag. The bard then looked back on his past hunting exploits and struggled to accept both his present inability to hunt and the fact that his final departure from his beloved island was going to be very soon.

As he grew ever closer to the end, Dòmhnall Ruadh also composed many poems in which he expressed contrition for his sins, expressed the hope for God's forgiveness, and prepared to face the Divine judgment seat. He often expressed hope in these poems that, instead of being consigned to Hell, he would be received into Heaven and reunited with his deceased friends and loved ones.

When Dòmhnall was dying in the hospital in Lochmaddy, Rev. Iain Mac a' Ghobhainn, the Church of Scotland minister of that town, wrote a tribute to the poet:

"Bu phrionnsa measg nam bàrd thu
Bha iomraiteach bad chuairt;
Do ghibtean bha neo-àbhaisteach,
'S neo-bhàsmhor bidh do dhuain.
Am feadh 's a bhios a' Ghàidhlig
Mar chànan aig an t-sluagh
An Uibhist, eilean d'àraich,
Bidh cuimhn' ort, a Dhòmhnall Ruaidh."

"You were a prince among the bards,
Renowned in your lifetime,
Unusually gifted,
And your poetry will ensure.
While Gaelic remains
The language of the people
In Uist, your native island,
You, Dòmhnall Ruaidh, will always be remembered."

According to Fred Macauley, "He not only had an artist's eye for detail but he had an understanding and sympathy for his fellow man which attracted people to his poetry and moved them in harmony with his themes. He was proud of his heritage as a Gael, he loved his language, and his roots were deep in the miracle of creation. His was a life of much sorrow, yet it ended in happiness and contentment without a trace of fear."

== Death ==
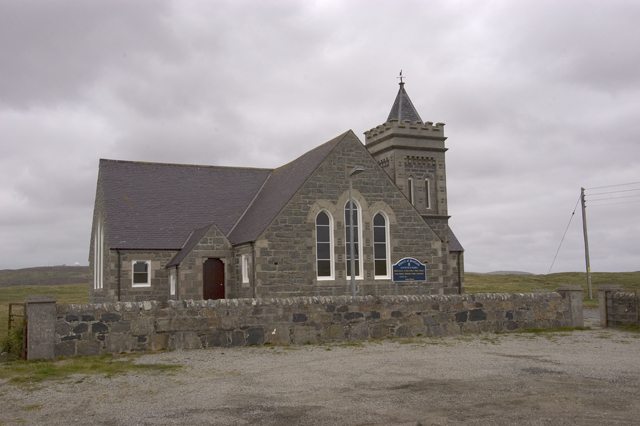
Kilmuir Church, North Uist.

Dòmhnall Ruadh Chorùna died at Lochmaddy on 13 August 1967.

Like the 18th century North Uist bard John MacCodrum, Dòmhnall Ruadh Chorùna lies buried in Kilmuir cemetery, which stands on the site of a Pre-Reformation parish church dedicated to the Virgin Mary. Dòmhnall Ruadh rests underneath a gravestone that bears a carving of a swan and a quotation from the second verse of his love song An Eala Bhàn:

"'Chan eil sinn uileadh ach air chuairt
Mar dhíthein buaile fás
Bheir siantannan na bliadhna síos
'S nach tog a' ghrian an áird."

"We are all of us on a brief journey,
Like the field flower that grows
And succumbs to the changing season,
The sun no longer able to revive it."

== Legacy ==
According to Ronald Black, "Fortunately, at the instigation of Fred MacAuley of the BBC, most of Dòmhnall Ruadh's poems and songs had been written down from his dictation shortly before his death by John Alick MacPherson, who was at that time a teacher at Paible. They were first published by Gairm Publications in 1969 in an all-Gaelic edition prepared by MacPherson, Dòmhnall Ruadh Chorùna. This edition contains 12 poems and songs from 1914–1920, 17 from 1920–1945, and 28 from 1945–1966, 57 items in all, although the later poems are, on average, much shorter than the earlier ones."

When it was first published in 1969, Dòmhnall Ruadh's verse proved very popular and all copies sold out in a very short time. Also, in a sign of how much things had changed since the bard's childhood, his poetry collection was adopted as a textbook for teaching the Scottish Gaelic language in the schools of the Hebrides. This, however, increased the book's scarcity.

Also according to Ronald Black, "[The first edition] was followed in 1995 by an illustrated bilingual edition, again titled Dòmhnall Ruadh Chorùna, this time edited by MacAuley himself and published by Comann Eachdraidh Uibhist a-Tuath. Thanks to the excellent memory of the poet's cousin, Maggie Boyd (Mrs. John MacQuarrie, who died in 1994), to whom Dòmhnall liked to sing each new composition as soon as it was made, the new edition contains 61 items along with extra fragments."

Since its author's death, An Eala Bhàn has been overwhelmingly voted as the greatest Gaelic song of all time in a poll by the BBC. It has also been both sung and recorded by artists as diverse as Calum Kennedy, Donnie Munro, and Capercaillie.

Ronald Black has written about his place in Scottish Gaelic literature, "Dòmhnall Ruadh Chorùna is the outstanding Gaelic poet of the trenches. His best known song An Eala Bhàn ("The White Swan") was produced there for home consumption, but in a remarkable series of ten other compositions he describes what it looked, felt, sounded and even smelt like to march up to the front, to lie awake on the eve of battle, to go over the top, to be gassed, to wear a mask, to be surrounded by the dead and dying remains of Gaelic-speaking comrades, and so on. Others of his compositions contain scenes of deer hunting, a symbolically traditional pursuit of which he happened to be passionately fond, and which he continued to practice all his life."

As of 1999, the poet's heirs and the guardians of his copyrights were Mary Campbell, Neil Campbell, and Mrs. Fay Buesnel of Jersey in the Channel Islands, all of whom are the children of Mrs. Maggie Campbell, the niece of Dòmhnall's wife.

On 1 July 2016, following a brief introduction by actress Joely Richardson, Scottish folk singer and North Uist native Julie Fowlis performed An Eala Bhàn in Gaelic before a large audience at the Thiepval Memorial on the hundredth anniversary of the Battle of the Somme. The performance was broadcast live. Three senior members of the British royal family, Prince William, Catherine, Duchess of Cambridge, and Prince Harry were in attendance.

The South Uist poet Dòmhnall Iain Dhonnchaidh, who was a cousin of Dòmhnall Ruadh Chorùna, wrote the following eulogy for him:

| Mhol thu 'n eala bhàn gu ciatach Ann am briathran brèagha bàidheil, Dh'inn's thu dhuinn mu 'liuthad deuchainn Tron deach thu ri beulaibh nàmhaid Mhol thu 'n tìr a dh'àraich òg thu, Uibhist bhòidheach bheag a' chrà-gheoidh... | "You praised the White Swan with elegance In splendid, loving words, You told us of how many trials You survived in going against the foe: You praised the land that reared you young, Lovely little sheldraked Uist..." |
