= John Munro (poet) =

Scottish soldier and poet

John Munro MC (10 December 1889, Swordale, Isle of Lewis – 16 April 1918 Ploegsteert, Belgium) was a Scottish soldier and poet who won the Military Cross during the First World War. He was killed in action three days later while serving as a 2nd Lieutenant with the 7th Battalion Seaforth Highlanders during the 1918 Spring Offensive. Lt. Munro, writing in his native Gaelic as Iain Rothach, came to be ranked by critics alongside the major war poets. Only three of his poems are known to survive; Ar Tir ("Our Land"), Ar Gaisgich a Thuit sna Blàir ("Our Heroes Who Fell in Battle"), and Air sgàth nan sonn ("For the Sake of the Warriors").

Ronald Black has written that Munro's three poems leave behind "his thoughts on his fallen comrades in tortured free verse full of reminiscence-of-rhyme; forty more years were to pass before free verse became widespread in Gaelic."

A collection of his poetry was prepared and given to a local minister for safekeeping and publication, but the manuscript was scandalously lost. Derick S. Thomson – a similarly important figure in Scottish Gaelic literature poet and Professor of Celtic Studies at the University of Glasgow – hailed Lt. Munro as "the first strong voice of the new Gaelic verse of the 20th century".
