= Ship of State =

Metaphor in The Republic by Plato

The Ship of State is an ancient and oft-cited metaphor, famously expounded by Plato in the Republic (Book 6, 488a–489d), which likens the governance of a city-state to the command of a vessel. Plato expands the established metaphor and ultimately argues that the only people fit to be captain of the ship (Ancient Greek: ναῦς) are philosopher kings, benevolent men with absolute power who have access to the Form of the Good. The origins of the metaphor can be traced back to the lyric poet Alcaeus (fragments 6, 208, 249), and it is also found in Aeschylus' Seven Against Thebes, Sophocles' Antigone and Aristophanes' Wasps before Plato. During the Renaissance, Sebastian Brant amplified and reworked Plato's text in a satirical book called Ship of Fools (Das Narrenschiff, 1494) which was soon translated into Latin, French and English.

== Plato's use of the metaphor ==
Plato establishes the comparison by saying that Zeus was one of the best models of describing the steering of a ship as just like any other "craft" or profession—in particular, that of a statesman. He then runs the metaphor in reference to a particular type of government: democracy. Plato's democracy is not the modern notion of a mix of democracy and republicanism, but rather direct democracy by way of pure majority rule.

In the metaphor, found at 488a–489d, Plato's Socrates compares the population at large to a strong but near-sighted ship's master. The quarreling sailors are demagogues and politicians, and the ship's navigator is a philosopher. The sailors flatter themselves with claims to knowledge of sailing, despite knowing nothing of navigation, and are constantly vying with one another for the approval of the master, offering wine and gifts. In truth, the sailors care little for the master's wellbeing, and desire only to gain captaincy of the ship and access to its valuable food stores. The navigator is dismissed as a useless stargazer yet is the only one with the knowledge to direct the ship's course safely.

== Metaphor ==
The metaphor of the ship of state:

Imagine then a fleet or a ship in which there is a captain who is taller and stronger than any of the crew, but he is a little deaf and has a similar infirmity in sight, and his knowledge of navigation is not much better. The sailors are quarrelling with one another about the steering—everyone is of opinion that he has a right to steer, though he has never learned the art of navigation and cannot tell who taught him or when he learned, and will further assert that it cannot be taught, and they are ready to cut in pieces anyone who says the contrary. They throng about the captain, begging and praying him to commit the helm to them; and if at any time they do not prevail, but others are preferred to them, they kill the others or throw them overboard, and having first chained up the noble captain’s senses with drink or some narcotic drug, they mutiny and take possession of the ship and make free with the stores; thus, eating and drinking, they proceed on their voyage in such manner as might be expected of them. Him who is their partisan and cleverly aids them in their plot for getting the ship out of the captain’s hands into their own whether by force or persuasion, they compliment with the name of sailor, pilot, able seaman, and abuse the other sort of man, whom they call a good-for-nothing; but that the true pilot must pay attention to the year and seasons and sky and stars and winds, and whatever else belongs to his art, if he intends to be really qualified for the command of a ship, and that he must and will be the steerer, whether other people like or not the possibility of this union of authority with the steerer’s art has never seriously entered into their thoughts or been made part of their calling. Now in vessels which are in a state of mutiny and by sailors who are mutineers, how will the true pilot be regarded? Will he not be called by them a prater, a star-gazer, a good-for-nothing?

— Plato, The Republic, Book VI (The Philosophy of Government)

== The Ship of State since Plato ==
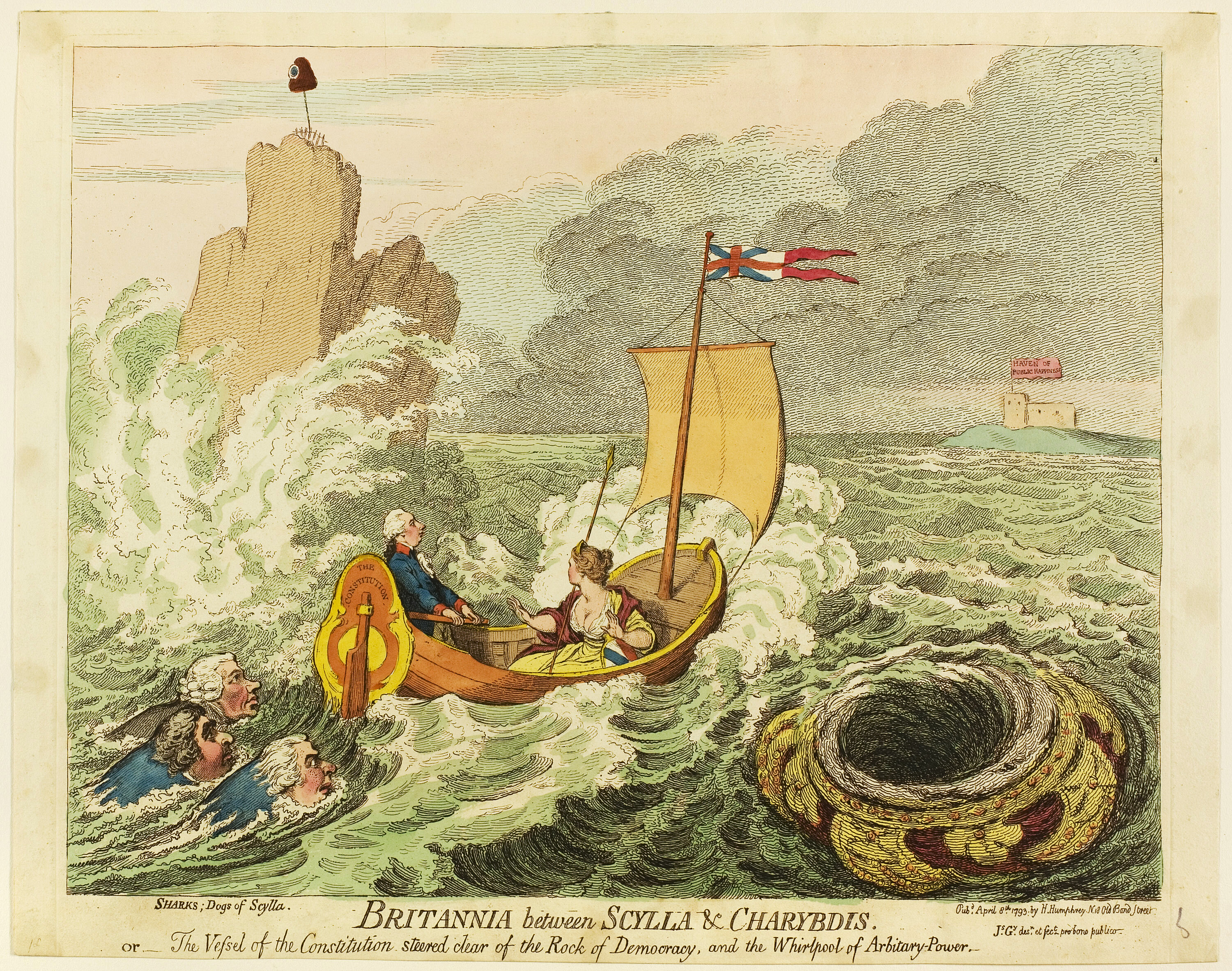
1793 cartoon depicting William Pitt steering the British Ship of State between democracy and autocracy

Reference to it has been made routinely throughout Western culture ever since its inception; two notable literary examples are Horace's ode 1.14 and "O Ship of State" by Henry Wadsworth Longfellow. Roger Williams, the founder of Rhode Island, used the metaphor in his "Letter to the Town of Providence" (1656). The Jacobins of the French Revolution frequently used this reference for the new French Republic as it defended itself from several European monarchies .

It was also used by the biographer Asser in his Life of King Alfred, with the King "struggling like an excellent pilot to guide his ship laden with much wealth to the desired and safe haven of his homeland.

Thomas Carlyle used it to inveigh against the democratic movements of his time. More recently, it has become a staple of American political discussion, where it is viewed simply as its image of the state as a ship, in need of a government as officers to command it—and conspicuously absent of its anti-democratic, pro-absolutist original meaning.

The term has entered popular culture as well. Leonard Cohen's song "Democracy" contains the line "Sail on. Sail on, o mighty ship of state. To the shores of need, past the reefs of greed, through the squalls of hate." Also, in his second novel Beautiful Losers (1966), Cohen writes "Sail on, sail on, O Ship of State, auto accidents, births, Berlin, cures for cancer!" (p. 12). In the British TV series Yes Minister, Sir Humphrey Appleby pointed out that "the Ship of State is the only ship that leaks from the top".

== See also ==
- Allegorical interpretations of Plato
- Collective intelligence
- Plato's political philosophy
- Spaceship Earth
