= Rack-rent =

Full or excessive rent

Rack-rent denotes two different concepts:

1. an excessive rent.
2. the full rent of a property, including both land and improvements as if it were subject to an immediate open-market rental review.

The second definition is equivalent to the economic rent of the land plus interest on capital improvements plus depreciation and maintenance—the normal market rent of a property—and is not inherently excessive. Also, this may be different from the rent actually being received. For short term lettings—e.g. rooms in hotels or houses let for holidays, the "rack rent" is the maximum potential rent assuming full occupancy (less downtime for repairs).

Historically, rack-rent has often been a term of protest used to denote an unjustly excessive rent (the word "rack" evoking the medieval torture device), usually one paid by a tenant farmer. The two conceptions of rack-rent both apply when excessive rent is obtained by threat of eviction resulting in uncompensated dispossession of improvements the tenant himself has made. I.e., by charging rack-rent, the landowner unjustly uses his power over the land to effectively confiscate wages, in addition to merely charging the tenant interest and depreciation on the capital improvements which the landlord himself has made to the land.

When there is no accessible rent-free land, any improvements in the condition of society, be they in the form of civilizational progress or local improvement, are recaptured in the form of higher land values, and the leftover wages after rent is paid will tend towards subsistence, as described by David Ricardo's Law of Rent. Such rents can be described as rack-rent, and this sense of the term is economically meaningful, and distinct from other forms of rent.

In Ulster in the 1700s, "... landlords were able to 'auction off' leases to the highest bidders. That practice, known as 'rack renting', forced renters to bid more than they could afford to pay."

== See also ==
- Castle Rackrent
