= Fenmore =

Fenmore may refer to:

- Dylan Fenmore, fictional son of Lauren Fenmore Baldwin in the American soap opera The Young and the Restless
- Fenmore, Michigan, community within Chapin Township, Michigan, United States
- Jill Abbott Fenmore or Jill Foster Abbott, fictional character on the CBS daytime soap opera The Young and the Restless
- Lauren Fenmore Baldwin, fictional character from the American soap opera The Young and the Restless

== See also ==
- Benmore (disambiguation)
- Fenimore (disambiguation)
- Fenimorea
