= Calvay (disambiguation) =

Calvay or Calbhaigh meaning "calf island" in Scottish Gaelic could refer to one of three islets off the coast of South Uist in Scotland:

- Calvay, an island in the Sound of Eriskay;
- Calbhaigh, an island at the entrance to Loch Boisdale near to which Calvay Castle is found;
- Calbhaigh, a tidal island in Loch Eynort
