= Beinn Ruigh Choinnich =

Hill on an island in the Outer Hebrides Scotland

Coordinates: 57.15593°N 7.27950°W

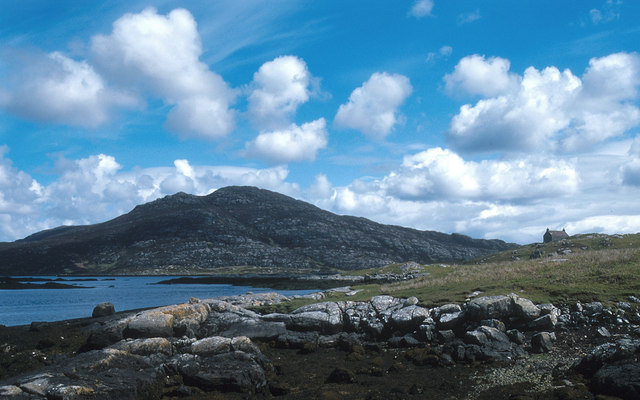

Highest point
- Elevation: 275 m (902 ft)
- Prominence: 169 m (554 ft)
- Listing: Marilyn

Geography
- Location: South Uist, Western Isles, Scotland
- OS grid: NF809196

Beinn Ruigh Choinnich is a hill which overlooks the port of Lochboisdale on the east coast of the island of South Uist in the Outer Hebrides Scotland. Its name is sometimes given in English as Ben Kenneth, although a literal translation would be 'the hill of Kenneth's slope'. The origin of the name is unknown. The hill is 275 m in height and can be climbed quite easily.

Every year on the first Sunday in August, a race is held where competitors run from Lochboisdale pier to the top of Beinn Ruigh Choinnich and back to the pier.
