= Easaval =

Mountain in United Kingdom

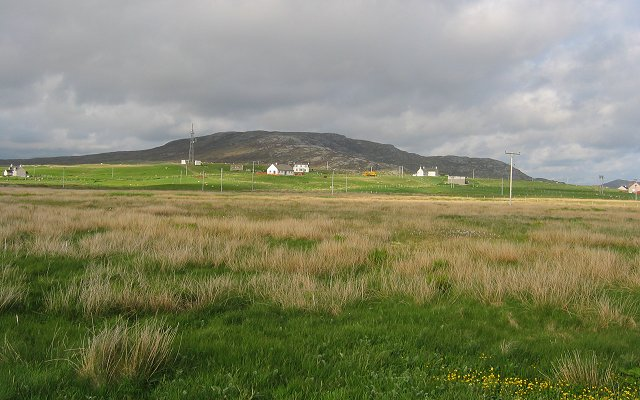
- Farm land behind the Pollachar Inn, looking towards Easabhal

Highest point
- Elevation: 243 m (797 ft)
- Prominence: 239 m (784 ft)
- Listing: Marilyn
- Coordinates: 57°07′10″N 7°19′56″W

Naming
- Language of name: Gaelic

Geography
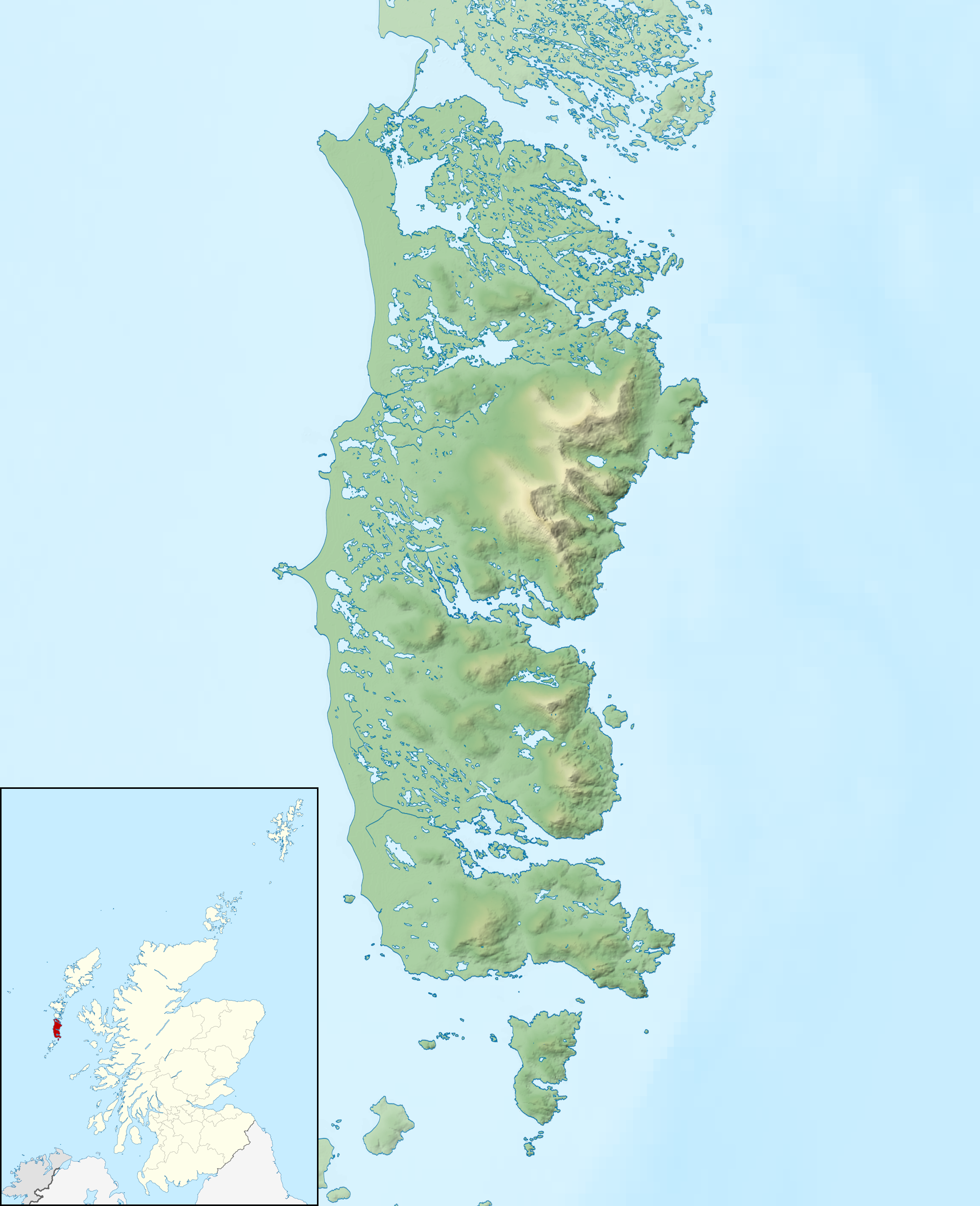
- Location within South Uist
- Location: South Uist, Outer Hebrides, Scotland
- OS grid: NF774158

Easaval (Scottish Gaelic: Easabhal) is one of the smallest hills on the island of South Uist in the Outer Hebrides of Scotland, with a height of 243 metres (797 ft). It is a small rounded hill located south of Lochboisdale near Pollachar in the southernmost part of South Uist, overlooking the Sound of Barra.

There are good views from the top, including distant views of St Kilda on the northwestern horizon, almost 60 miles (100 kilometres) away. On a clear day one can also see Beinn Mhòr, the highest hill in South Uist, Skye, Rùm, Canna, Eigg and Muck. To the south there are views of Barra, Coll and Tiree, the Isle of Mull, and landmarks on the mainland such as the lighthouse on Ardnamurchan, all the great mainland hills between Glenelg and Ardnamurchan, and the peaks of Beinn Talaidh, Beinn Bhearnach and Dun da Ghaoith.
