= Howmore =

Coordinates: 57.302°N 7.372°W

Howmore: Scottish Gaelic: Togh Mòr / Tobha Mor
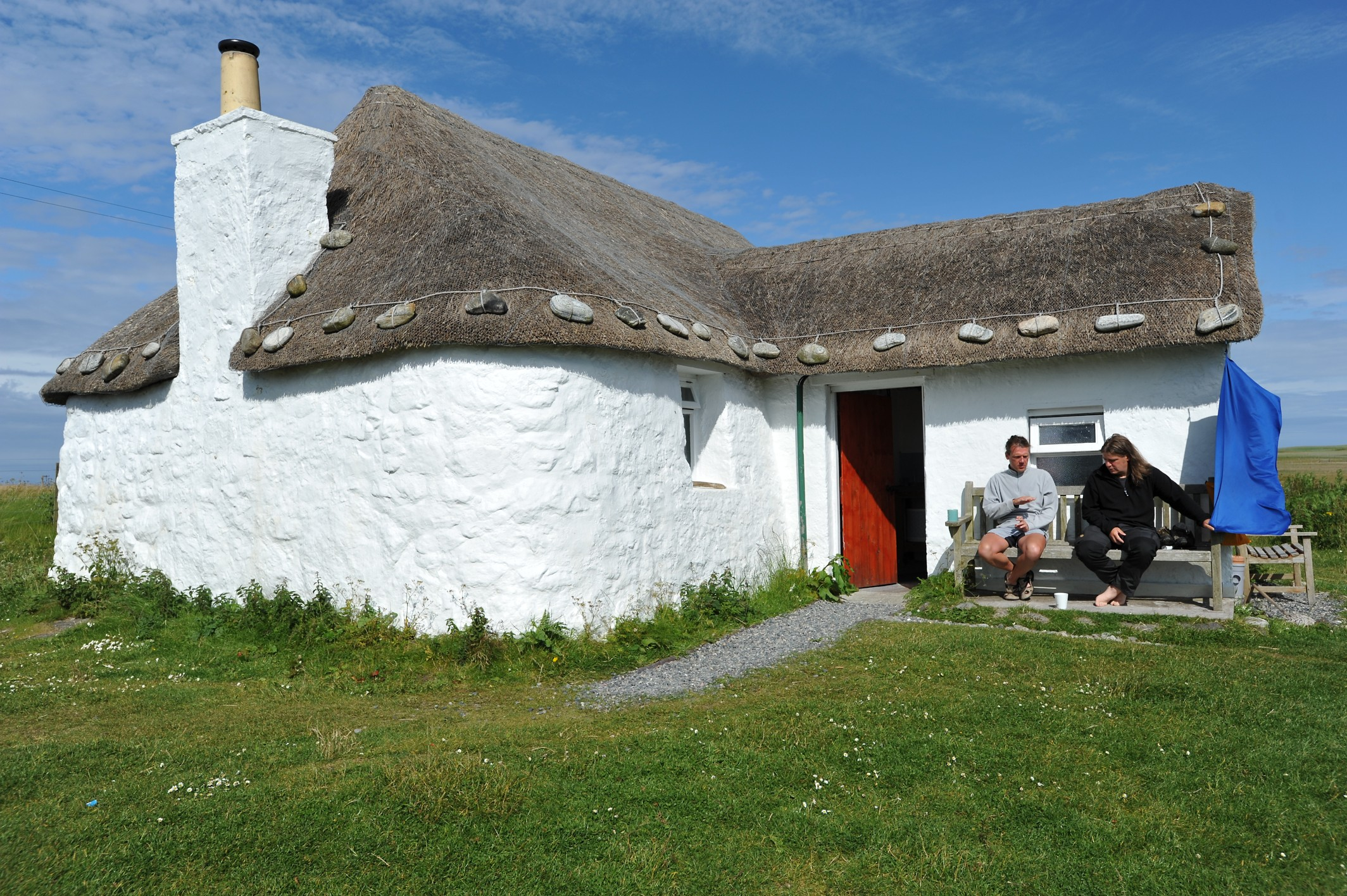
- Howmore youth hostel

- Location within the Outer Hebrides
- Language: Scottish Gaelic; English
- OS grid reference: NF765362
- Civil parish: South Uist
- Council area: Na h-Eileanan Siar
- Lieutenancy area: Western Isles
- Country: Scotland
- Sovereign state: United Kingdom
- Post town: ISLE OF SOUTH UIST
- Postcode district: HS8
- Dialling code: 01870
- Police: Scotland
- Fire: Scottish
- Ambulance: Scottish
- UK Parliament: Na h-Eileanan an Iar
- Scottish Parliament: Na h-Eileanan an Iar

Howmore (Scottish Gaelic: Togh Mòr / Tobha Mor) lies on the island of South Uist to the southwest of Loch Druidibeg. The mountain of Haarsal rises to 139 m (456 ft) to the east and immediately south is the smaller settlement of Howbeg. Howmore is also within the parish of South Uist.

== Geography ==
The area is largely flat but dominated by the mountain Beinn Mhòr. A rewarding day's hillwalking can be had on Beinn Mhor and Hecla [606 m (1,988 ft)] - South Uist's highest hills. Loch Druidibeg Nature Reserve, 3 km (1.9 mi) to the north, is an important site for breeding greylag geese and a sanctuary for the corncrake, now, within Britain, almost unique to the Western Isles. Howmore is situated alongside the A865. The ruins of Flora MacDonald's birthplace can be found near Milton, 11 km (6.8 mi) south of Howmore, marked with a commemorative cairn.

On the southern slopes of Beinn Mhor is the wooded area of Allt Volagir, one of the few areas of natural woodland left in the Hebrides.

== History ==
According the oral tradition, South Uist was heavily wooded once until the arrival of the Vikings who are traditionally blamed for clear clearing the forests (though this fact is disputed).

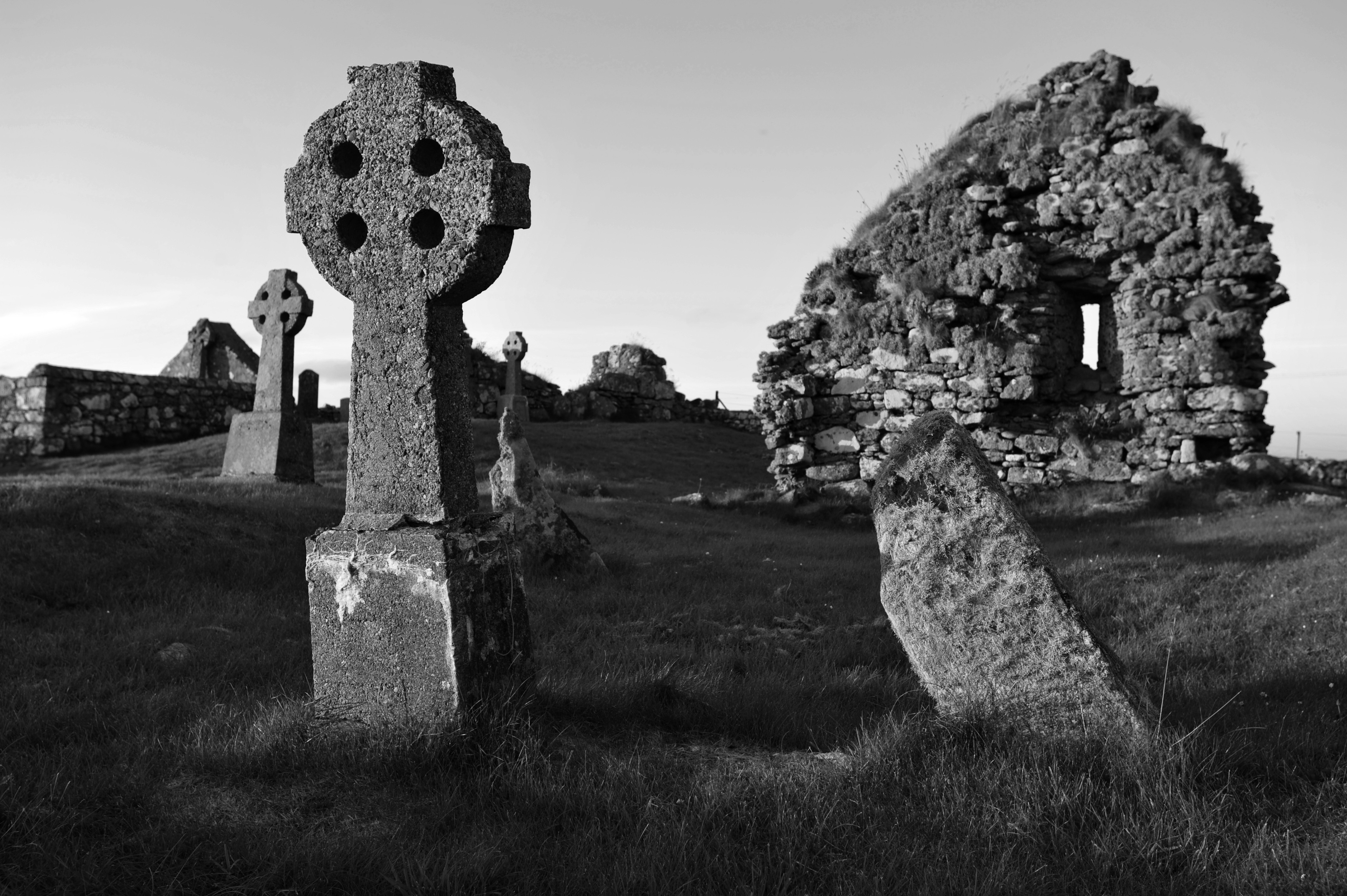
Howmore ruins

The village is perhaps best known for its remarkable collection of ruined churches and chapels. The most striking remains are of the Teampull Mòr, the "Large Church" or St Mary's, of which only part of the east gable remains. This church probably dates back to the 13th century and it was used as the parish church. The ruins, which are supposed to have also housed a "College of Learning", are also important to the history of Scottish Gaelic literature. At least one of the ancestors of Scottish Gaelic national poet Alasdair mac Mhaighstir Alasdair and his first cousin, the famous Flora MacDonald, lies buried there.

In his later life, local poet Dòmhnall Iain Dhonnchaidh drew upon his imagination and local history, and composed the poems Smaointean - Aig Làrach Seann Eaglais Hogh Mòir ("Thoughts - at Howmore Temple Ruins") and Teampall Hogh Mòir ("Howmore Temple"); in which he called for a return to the simpler Medieval religious life once centered around by the ruined monastery Church.

== Community ==
=== Church ===
At the time of the Reformation, Howmore turned to Protestantism, though 95% of the population of South Uist remained Roman Catholic. Howmore Church, built in 1858, is therefore rather unusual; doubly so as it is one of the few churches in Scotland with a central Communion table. The church is white-harled and used as a landmark by fishermen off the west coast.

=== Leisure ===
Howmore is home to one of Scotland's largest collections of thatched buildings. The youth hostel is operated by Gatliff Hebridean Hostels Trust. It is located in a white-painted thatched building which has views to the east across ruined churches towards the peak of Hecla.

== Images ==
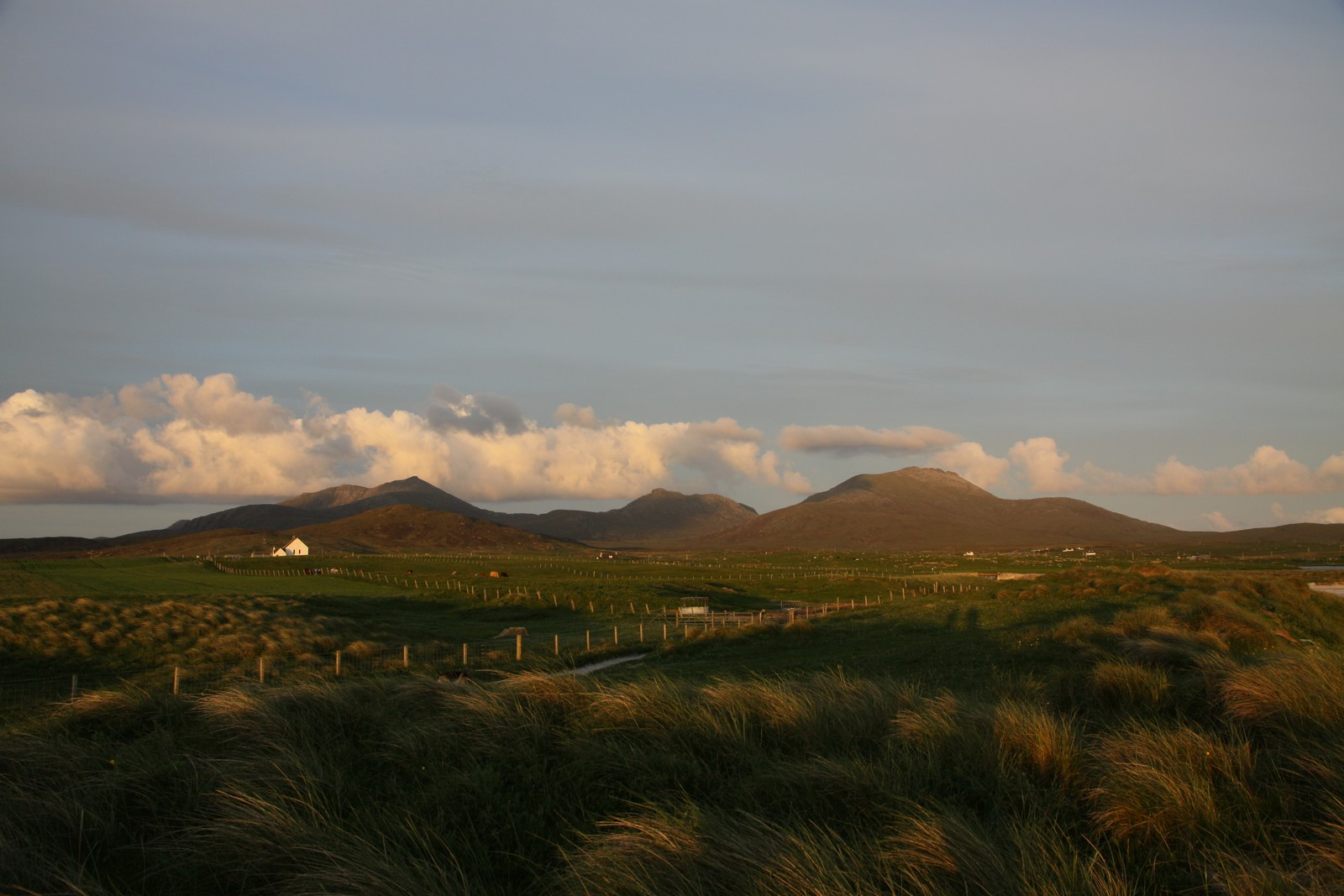
Howmore - Landscape

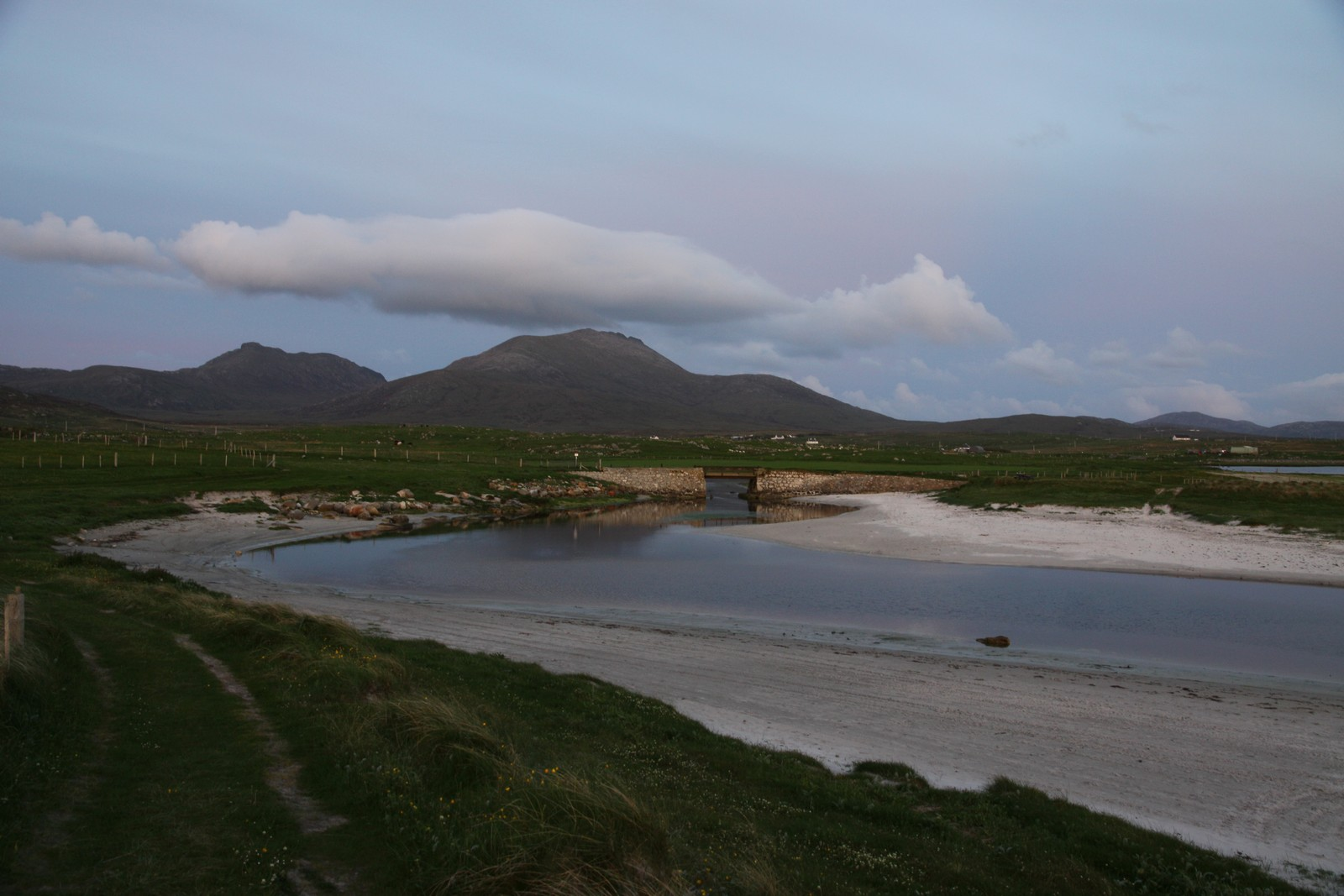
Howmore - Beach 1

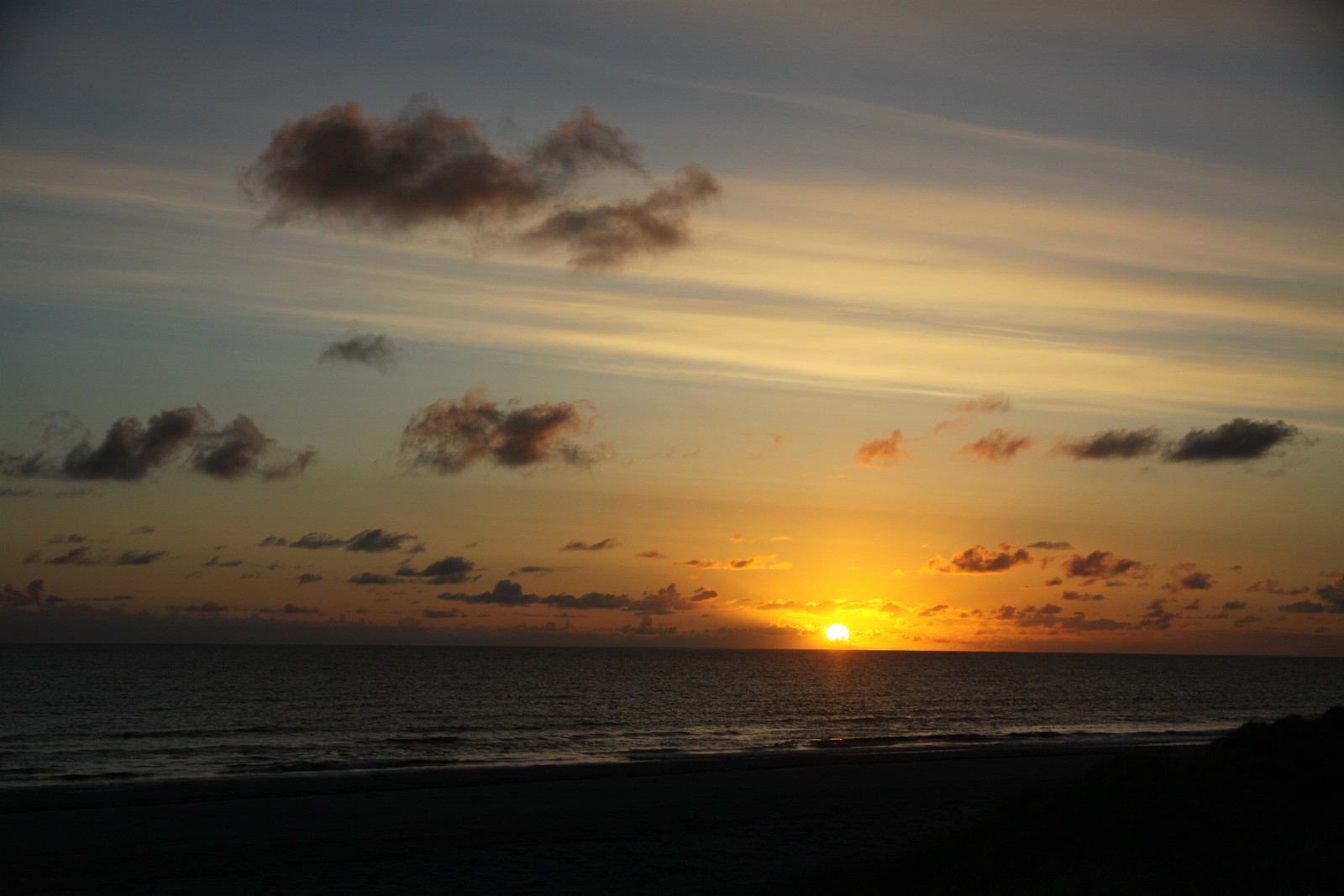
Howmore - Beach 2
