= Ben More =

Ben More or Beinn Mhòr may refer to:

== Hills in Scotland ==
=== Ben More ===
- Ben More (Crianlarich), 1174 m
- Ben More (Mull), 966 m
- Ben Mor Coigach, 743 m
- Ben More Assynt, 998 m

=== Beinn Mhòr ===
- Beinn Mhòr (Cowal), 741 m
- Beinn Mhòr (South Uist), 620 m
- Beinn Mhòr (Grantown), 471 m, a hill in the Southern Highlands
- Beinn Mhòr (Islay), 202 m, a hill on the Scottish Islands
- Beinn Mhòr (Lewis), 572 m, a hill on the Scottish Islands
- Beinn Mhòr (North Uist), 190 m, a hill on the Scottish Islands

== See also ==
- Binn Mhór (661 m), a mountain in the Maumturks in Connemara, Ireland
- Binn Mhór (333 m), a mountain in the Twelve Bens, in Connemara, Ireland
- Ben Moor (disambiguation)
- Ben Moore (disambiguation)
- Benjamin Moore (disambiguation)
- Benmore (disambiguation)
