= Fenimore =

Fenimore is both a given name and a surname. Notable people with the name include:

Given name:

- Constance Fenimore Woolson (1840–1894), American novelist and short story writer
- Fenimore Chatterton (1860–1958), American businessman, politician, and lawyer
- James Fenimore Cooper (1789–1851), American writer
- Susan Fenimore Cooper (1813–1894), American writer and amateur naturalist

Surname:

- Bob Fenimore (1925–2010), Oklahoma State Cowboys football player

Fictional characters:

- Lieutenant Fenimore, fictional character in a short story of the Cosmicomics by Italo Calvino

== See also ==
- Fenimore Art Museum, in Cooperstown, New York, United States
- Fenimore Pass, strait in Alaska
