= Kilaulay =

Coordinates: 57.388°N 7.407°W

Kilaulay: Scottish Gaelic: Cill Amhlaigh
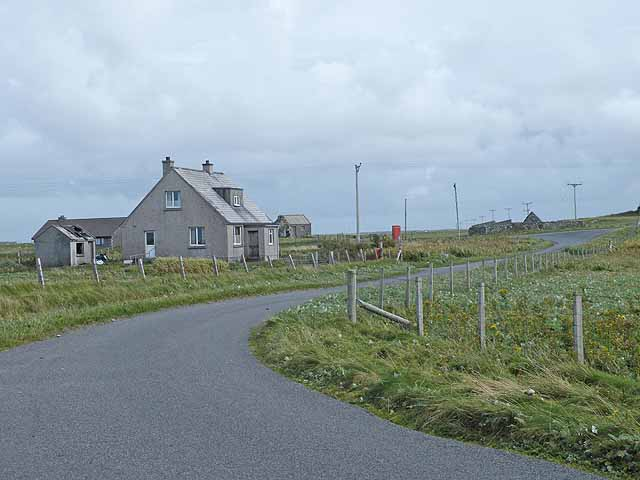
- A croft at Kilaulay

- Location within the Outer Hebrides
- Language: Scottish Gaelic; English
- OS grid reference: NF751459
- Civil parish: South Uist
- Council area: Na h-Eileanan Siar
- Lieutenancy area: Western Isles
- Country: Scotland
- Sovereign state: United Kingdom
- Post town: ISLE OF SOUTH UIST
- Postcode district: HS8
- Dialling code: 01878
- Police: Scotland
- Fire: Scottish
- Ambulance: Scottish
- UK Parliament: Na h-Eileanan an Iar
- Scottish Parliament: Na h-Eileanan an Iar

Kilaulay (Scottish Gaelic: Cill Amhlaigh / Cill Amhlaidh) is a crofting township on the island of South Uist, in the Outer Hebrides of Scotland. Kilaulay is located on the north-west corner of the island, situated about 1.5 miles (2.4 km) west of Eochar. Kilaulay is also within the parish of South Uist.

== Etymology ==
Kilaulay is an Anglicised form of the Scottish Gaelic Cill Amhlaigh (or Cill Amhlaidh), meaning "Amhlaigh's church" (or "Amhlaidh's church"). There is however no Gaelic saint who bears this name. In some cases the personal name Amhlaigh/Amhlaidh is a Gaelicisation of the Old Norse name Óláfr, so Kilaulay could possibly be dedicated to a Norse "Olaf".

== Chapel burial ground ==
The RCAHMS lists Kilaulay as the site of where a chapel and burial ground once stood. In the 19th century publication Origines Parochiales Scotiae, a chapel is said to have once stood at Kileulay ("Kilaulay"). (Note: Note that the RCAHMS's website for Kilaulay incorrectly quotes Origines Parochiales Scotiae as reading "Kilonlay" instead of "Kileulay".) The burial ground is supposedly that of a Danish princess named Aula or Olaff, who drowned while being caught in a storm off Uist. In May 1965, the site was visited and its location was confirmed by the tenant of Kilaulay farm. There was however no local knowledge of a church or chapel. At the time of the visit, the boundaries of the burial ground were no longer visible.

=== Supposed tradition of Kilaulay ===
According to an entry which appeared within the 19th century monthly periodical The Celtic Magazine, a tradition relating to Kilaulay existed at the time.

... the township in question—Cille Amhlaidh—bears the name of another priest—St Anflith or Amhlaidh, who lived and laboured faithfully and diligently for many years at Iochdar; and, having died there at a good old age, his remains were, in terms of his oft-expressed request, interred in the place, which has ever been called Cille Amhlaidh. It is but right to mention that St. Amhlaidh had no connection with the Macaulays of Lewis, who were of a different race altogether. The next priest, says tradition, who ministered to the spiritual wants of the people of Iochdar, was the famous St. Bliannan, a man whose name, on account of his holy zeal, ought to be better known and cherished by the people of South Uist than it is. This great Saint, in order that the flock under his charge at Cille Amhlaidh might derive some of the good enjoyed by the happy people who tread continuously on holy ground, went on one occasion, at no small personal expense, to Rome, and carried hence a quantity of soil, dug from the graves of the saints. After a long and weary journey, which occupied many months, he reached Cille Amhlaidh, in South Uist; and, taking the holy soil carried from Rome, he scattered it there in the form of a cross. From that day forward, the place has been looked upon as consecrated and, therefore, a sacred and favoured spot.

== See also ==
- South Uist
- St Olaf
