= Ben Moore =

Ben Moore may refer to:

- Ben Moore (judge) (1891–1958), U.S. federal judge
- Ben Moore (composer) (born 1960), U.S. composer
- Ben Moore (astrophysicist) (born 1966), U.K. astrophysicist and musician
- Ben Moore (footballer) (born 1977), Australian rules footballer
- Ben Moore (curator) (born 1978), British art curator, entrepreneur, and artist
- Ben Moore (snowboarder) (born 1986), U.K. snowboarder
- Ben Moore (basketball) (born 1995), U.S. basketball player
- Ben Moore (1941–2022), U.S. soul singer who performed under the name Bobby Purify
- Ben Moore (Chaos Walking), fictional characters

== See also ==
- Benjamin Moore (disambiguation)
- Ben Moor (disambiguation)
- Ben More (disambiguation)
