= Loch Bee =

Loch on South Uist, Scotland

Loch Bee Loch Bì
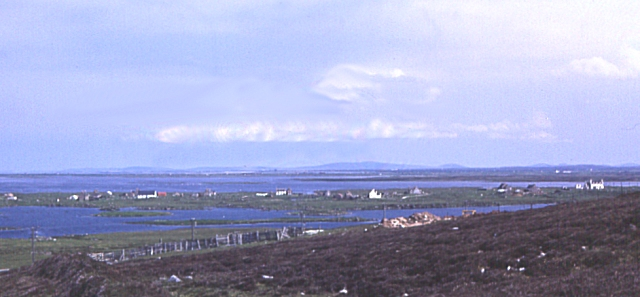

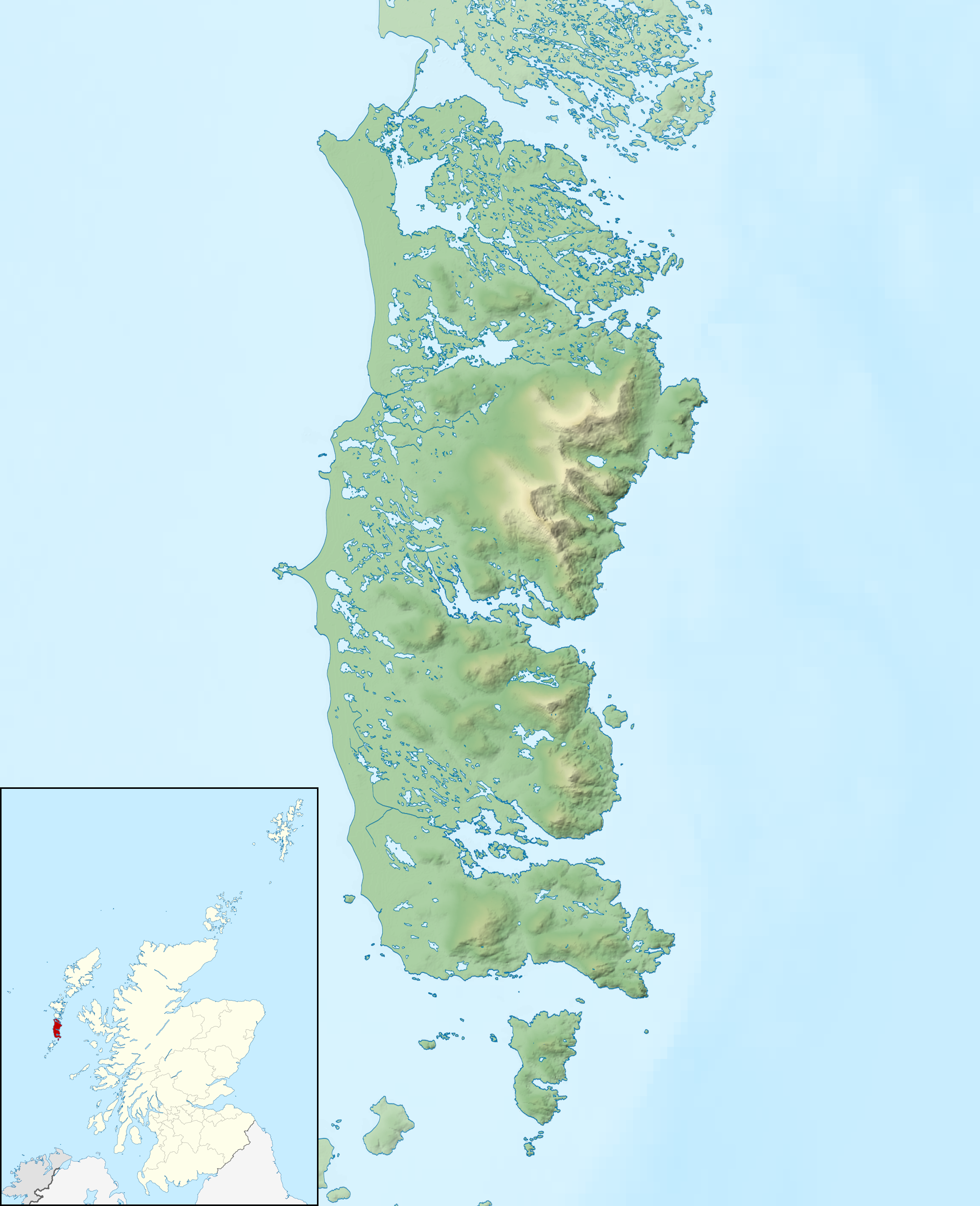
- Location within South Uist
- Location: South Uist, Outer Hebrides, Scotland
- Coordinates: 57°22′9.4″N 7°22′29″W
- Type: freshwater loch
- Basin countries: Scotland
- Max. length: 3 mi (5 km)
- Max. width: 1 mi (1.5 km)
- Islands: Limalum More, Eilean a' Charnan, Brostam More, Brostam Beg

Loch Bì, sometimes anglicised as Loch Bee, is the largest loch on the island of South Uist in the Outer Hebrides of Scotland. It lies at the northern end of the island.

Loch Bì has an irregular shape, and measures about three miles (five kilometres) long by one mile (1.5 kilometres) in mean breadth. Its greatest depth is around 12 feet (3.5 metres; 2 fathoms). Loch Bì is reputed for its trout, flounder and mullet stock.

Loch Bì is bisected by a causeway carrying the A865 road. The first causeway was built in the 17th century, with the existing structure having been completed in 1990.
