= Ben Moor =

Ben Moor may refer to:

- Ben Moor (writer) (born 1969), English writer
- Ben Moor (American football) (fl. 1970s), American football coach

== See also ==
- Ben Moore (disambiguation)
- Ben More (disambiguation)
- Benjamin Moore (disambiguation)
- Moor (disambiguation)
