= Bun Sruth =

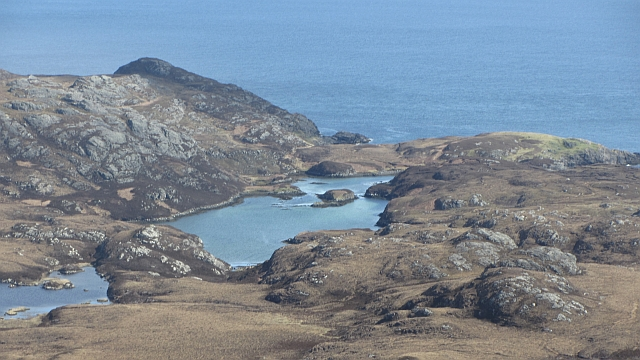
- The loch of Bun Sruth

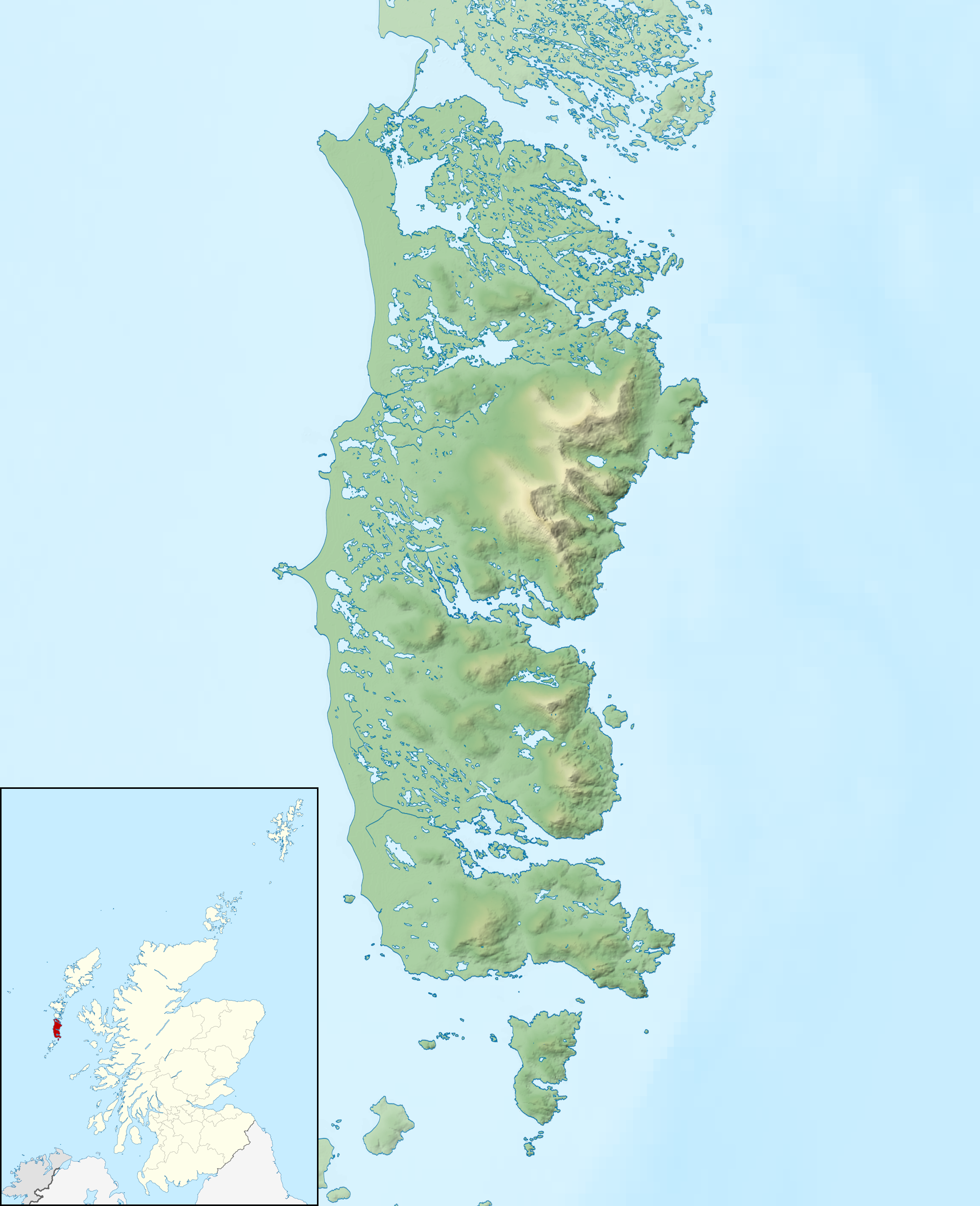
- Location within South Uist
- Location: South Uist Scotland
- Coordinates: 57.1115°N 7.2189°W
- Type: loch
- Max. length: 70 yards (64 m)

Bun Sruth is a small loch about 70 yards (64 m) in length at the southeast extremity of the island of South Uist in the Outer Hebrides of Scotland. It is surrounded by hills and is connected to the sea by a narrow passage between cliffs of sheer rock, from which its name, meaning "Bottom of the stream", is derived.

== Access ==
The only access to Bun Sruth is on foot or by boat. From the sea the narrow tidal gorge is difficult to find, and difficulties in negotiating the channel can arise from the fast tidal flow and from seaweed which prevents the use of a propeller. At low tide the water level in the loch is higher than sea level, and drains over a rock shelf in the entrance, making entrance by boat impossible until the tide has risen at least seven feet. Exit by boat is thus best undertaken just after high tide.

== Wildlife ==
The valley contains some ruins of croft houses, but the area is now inhabited only by sheep and wildlife. Pollock may be found in the loch, and both sea trout and salmon have been reported. Fishing vessels have been known to take shelter in the loch.
