= Calvay Castle =

Ruined castle on South Uist, Scotland

Coordinates: 57.1434°N 7.2637°W

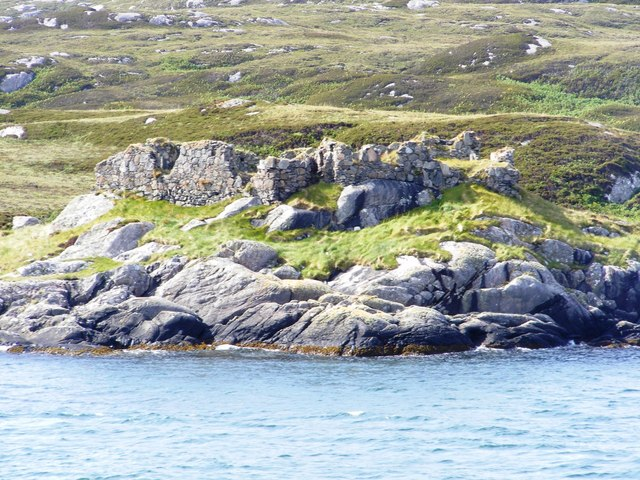
Ruins of Calvay Castle

Calvay Castle (Scottish Gaelic: Caisteal Calbhaigh) is a ruined castle on an islet close to the island of Calbhaigh, at the eastern approaches to Loch Boisdale, South Uist. The castle is linked by a causeway from Calbhaigh, which becomes inundated at high tide. The castle is a scheduled monument.

The castle may have been built by the MacRuaries of Garmoran, or by the MacNeils of Barra who were granted the lands of Boisdate in the 15th century. Bonnie Prince Charlie hid at the castle in June 1746, while fleeing from the Duke of Cumberland's troops after the Battle of Culloden.

The island also has a lighthouse, built by David Alan Stevenson in 1891.
