= Benjamin Moore =

Benjamin Moore may refer to:

- Benjamin Moore (artist) (1952–2021) American glass artist, and teacher
- Benjamin Moore (bishop) (1748–1816), American Episcopal Bishop of New York
- Benjamin Moore (biochemist) (1867–1922), British biochemist
- Benjamin D. Moore, killed in the Battle of San Pasqual on December 6, 1846
- Benjamin E. Moore, American politician, New York assemblyman 1914
- Benjamin Moore & Co., also known as Benjamin Moore Paints

== See also ==
- Ben Moore (disambiguation)
- Ben Moor (disambiguation)
- Ben More (disambiguation)
