= Hecla (South Uist) =

Hecla or Thacla
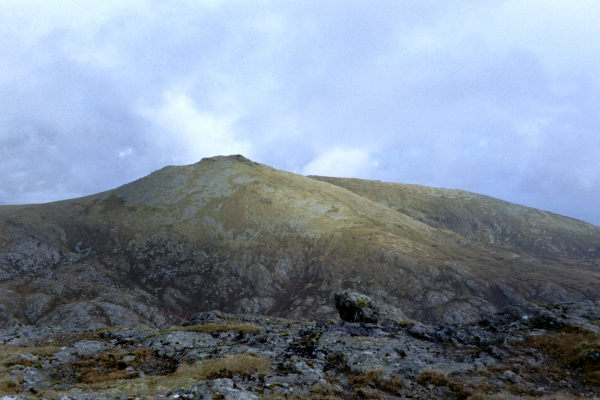

Highest point
- Elevation: 606 m (1,988 ft)
- Prominence: 307 m (1,007 ft)
- Listing: Marilyn
- Coordinates: 57°17′25″N 7°16′20″W

Geography
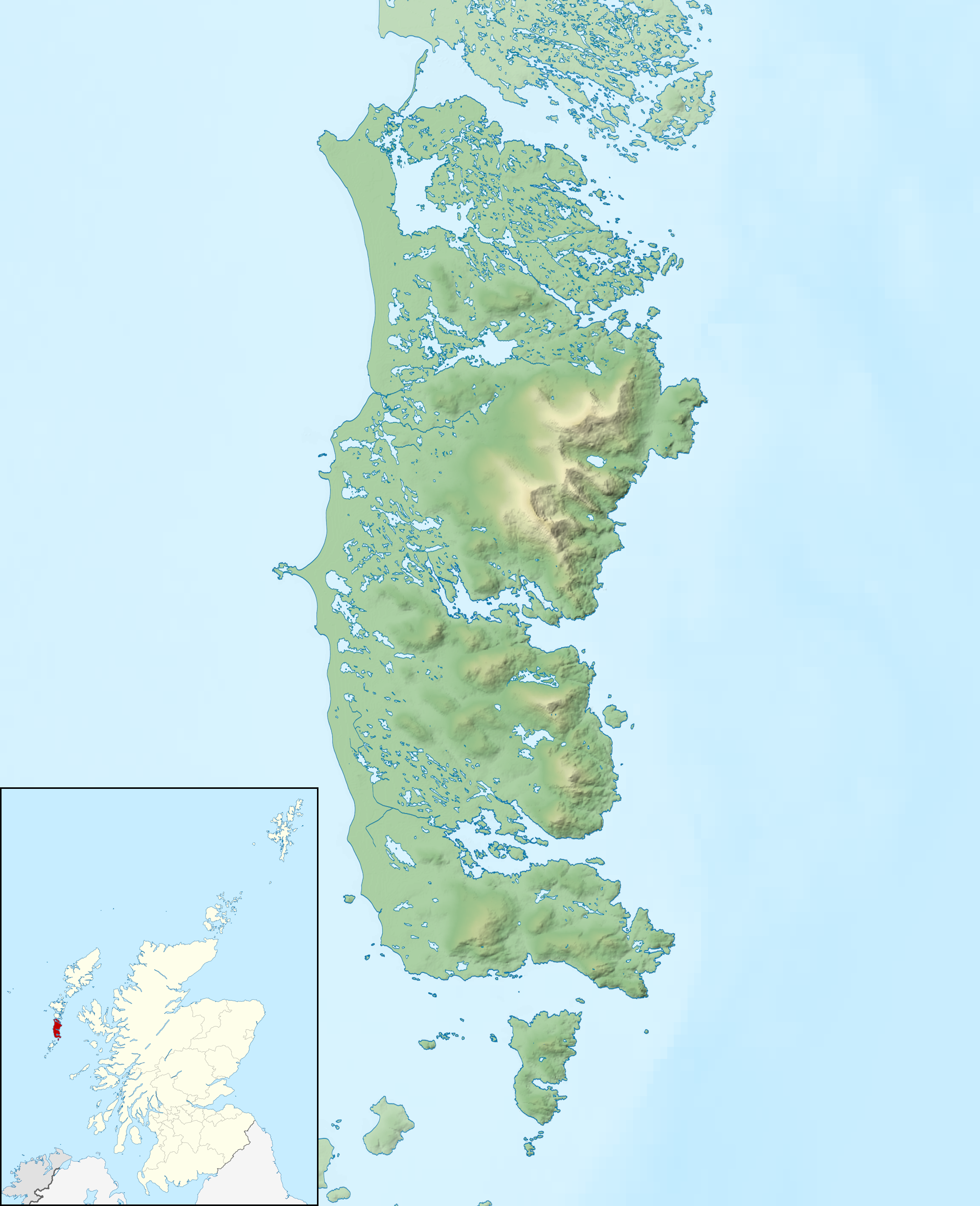
- Location within South Uist
- Location: South Uist, Outer Hebrides, Scotland
- OS grid: NF825345

Hecla or Thacla is a mountain on the island of South Uist in the Outer Hebrides of Scotland. With a height of 606 metres (1,988 ft), it is the second-highest hill on the island. The name Hecla is Norse for "serrated".
