= Fenimore Pass =

Strait in the Aleutian Islands in Alaska

Coordinates: 51°58′03″N 175°33′57″W

Fenimore Pass is a strait between the Bering Sea and the North Pacific Ocean in the Aleutian Islands in Alaska. It lies between Oglodak Island to the east and Tagalak Island to the west.
