= Benmore =

Benmore may refer to:

- Benmore, Utah, United States
- Benmore Valley AVA, United States
- Benmore Botanic Garden, Scotland
- Benmore Gardens, Gauteng, South Africa
- Benmore Dam, New Zealand
- Benmore Peak, New Zealand
- Lake Benmore, New Zealand
- Benmore or Fair Head, a headland in Northern Ireland

== See also ==
- Ben More (disambiguation)
