= South Uist =

Island of the Outer Hebrides, Scotland

Uibhist a Deas (Gaelic); Sooth Uist (Scots)

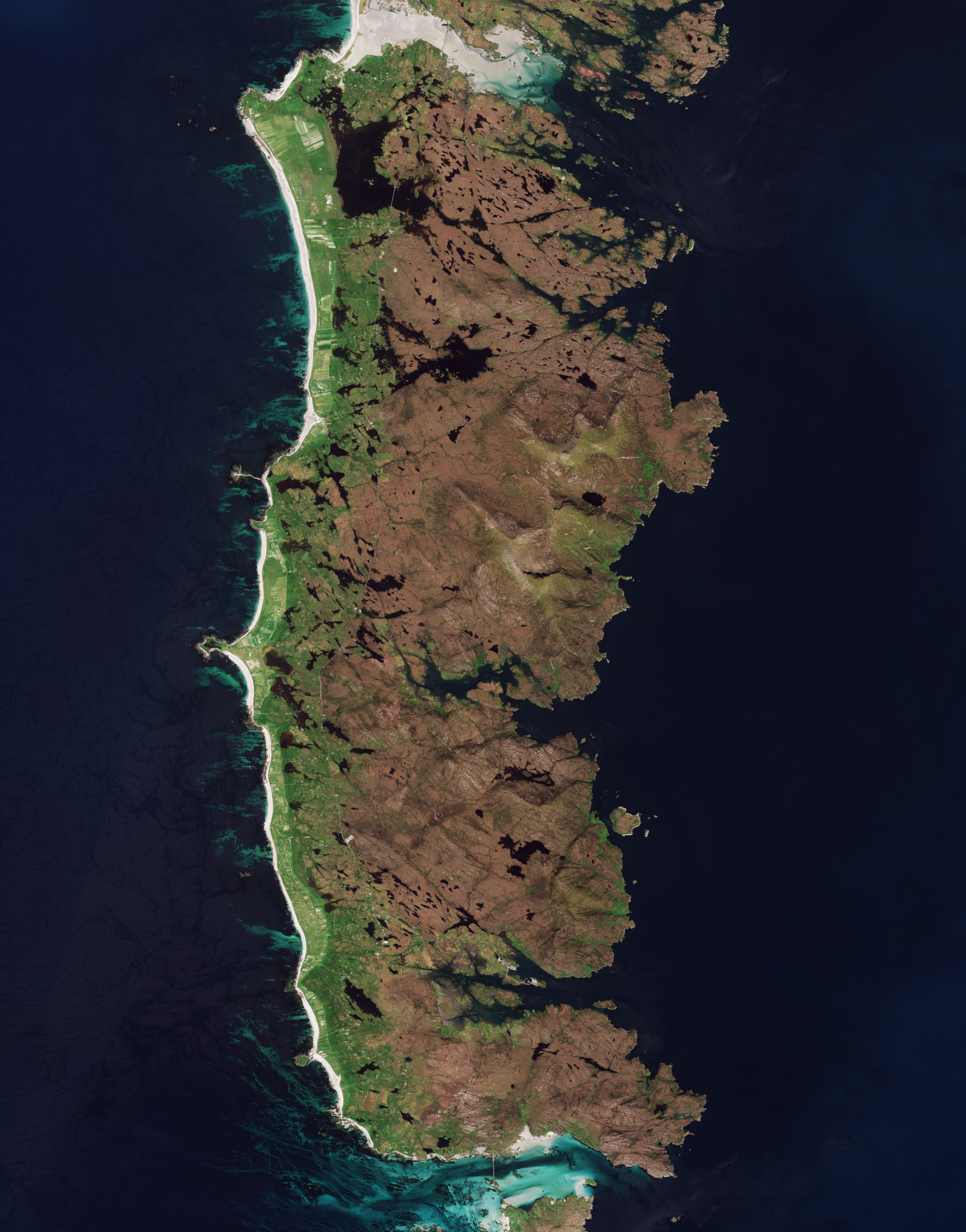

Location
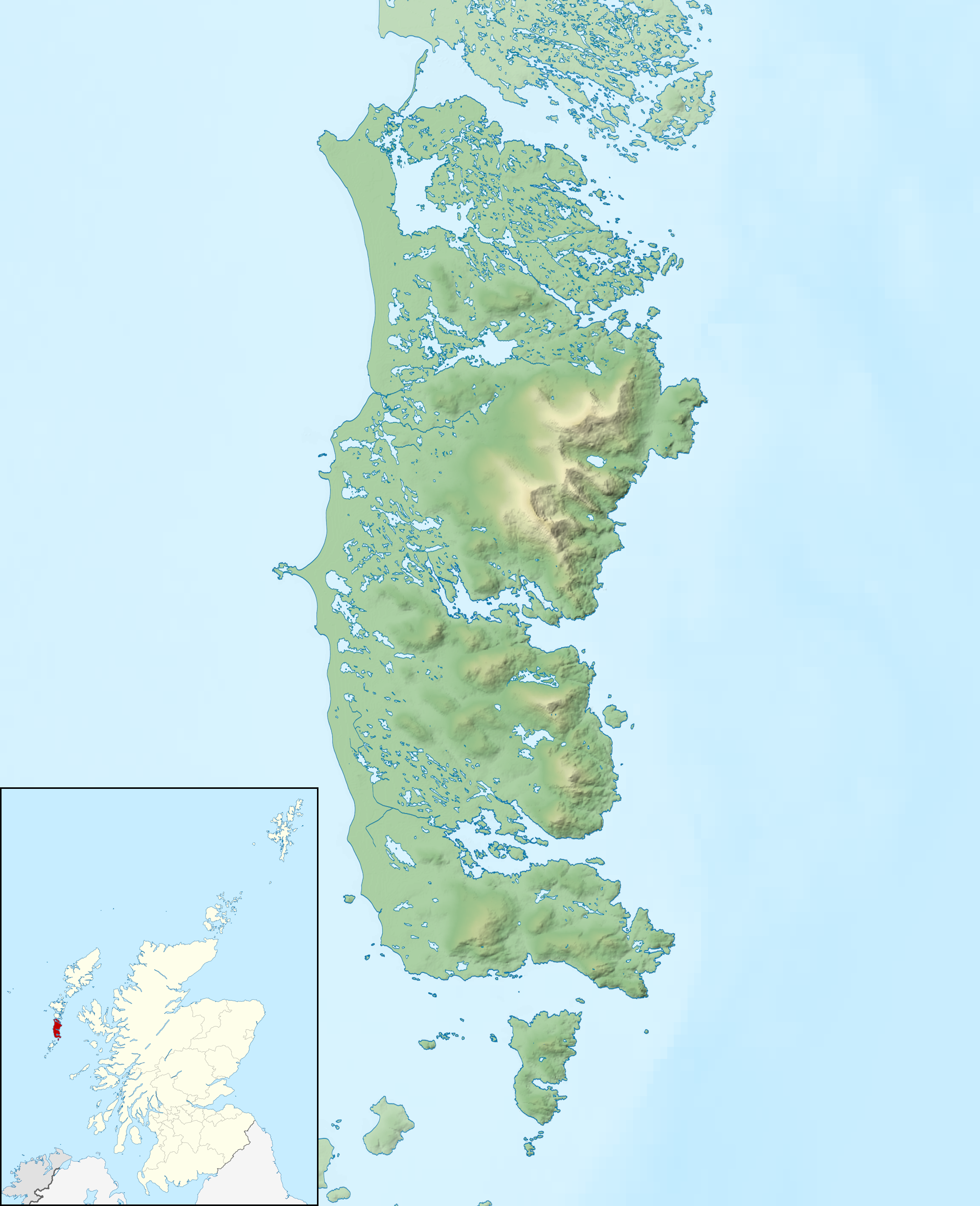
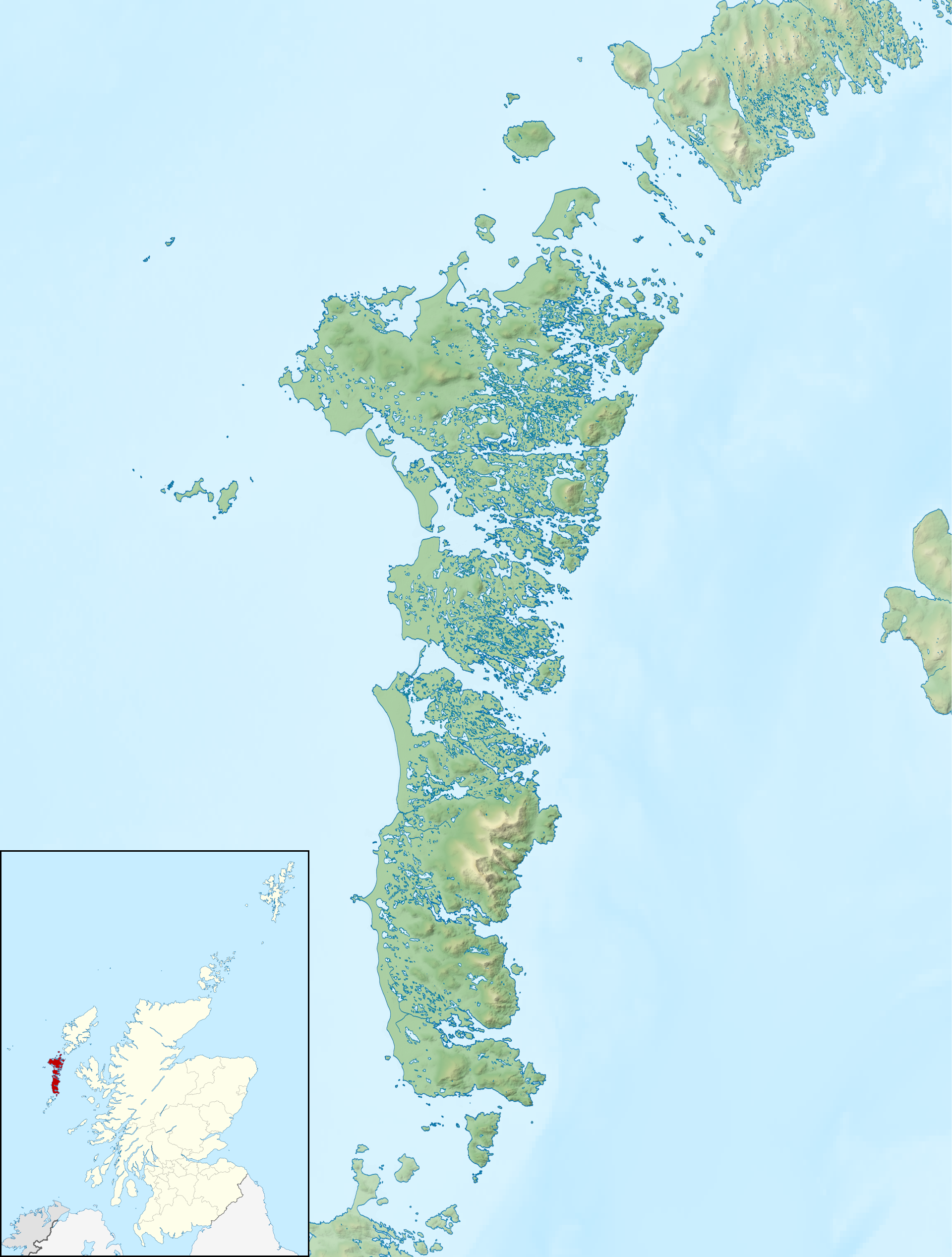
- Map of South Uist & surrounding islands South Uist shown within Uist South Uist shown within the Outer Hebrides
- OS grid reference: NF786343
- Coordinates: 57.2667°N 7.3167°W

Name
- Name meaning: Unknown

Physical geography
- Island group: Uist & Barra
- Area: 32,026 hectares (124 sq mi)
- Area rank: 9
- Highest elevation: Beinn Mhòr 620 metres (2,030 ft)

Administration
- Council area: Na h-Eileanan Siar
- Country: Scotland
- Sovereign state: United Kingdom

Demographics
- Population: ▼1,650
- Population rank: 9
- Population density: 5.15 people/km^{2}
- Largest settlement: Lochboisdale

South Uist (Scottish Gaelic: Uibhist a Deas, [ˈɯ.ɪʃtʲ ə ˈtʲes̪]; Scots: Sooth Uist) is the second-largest island of the Outer Hebrides in Scotland. At the 2022 census it had a usually resident population of 1,650, a decrease of 104 since 2011. The island, in common with the rest of the Hebrides, is one of the last remaining strongholds of the Gaelic language in Scotland. South Uist's inhabitants are known in Gaelic as Deasaich (Southerners). The population is about 90% Roman Catholic.

The island is home to a nature reserve and a number of sites of archaeological interest, including the only location in the British Isles where prehistoric mummies have been found. In the northwest, there is a missile testing range. In 2006 South Uist, together with neighbouring Benbecula and Eriskay, was involved in Scotland's biggest-ever community land buyout by Stòras Uibhist. The group also owns the "biggest community wind farm in Scotland", Lochcarnan, on South Uist which opened in 2013.

== Geology ==
In common with the rest of the Western Isles, South Uist is formed from the oldest rocks in Britain, Lewisian gneiss brought to the surface by old tectonic movements. They bear the scars of the last glaciation which has exposed many of them. The rocks had high-grade regional metamorphism around 2,900 million years ago: in the Archaean eon. Some show granulite facies metamorphism, but most have slightly cooler amphibolite facies. A number of metabasic bodies and metasediments occur locally in the gneiss.

On the east side of the island between Lochboisdale and Ornish – part of the Outer Hebrides Thrust Zone – is the Corodale gneiss, dominated by garnet-pyroxene rock. A narrow zone of pseudotachylyte occurs along its western margin with the regular gneiss. The Usinish peninsula is formed from ‘mashed gneiss’, within which the banding has mainly been destroyed. Between these two gneisses is a band of mylonite (as offshore on Stuley). Mashed gneiss occurs again in the extreme southeast. Small occurrences of Archaean granites are found in the centre of the island.

The island is traversed by many normal faults: E to W, to NNW to SSE, many being NW to SE. Numerous NW to SE dykes cut through the island: quartz-dolerite, camptonite and monchiquite dykes of Permo-Carboniferous age and later Palaeogene tholeiitic dykes. More recent geological deposits include blown sand along the northern and western coasts and peat inland along with some (glacial) till.

== Geography ==
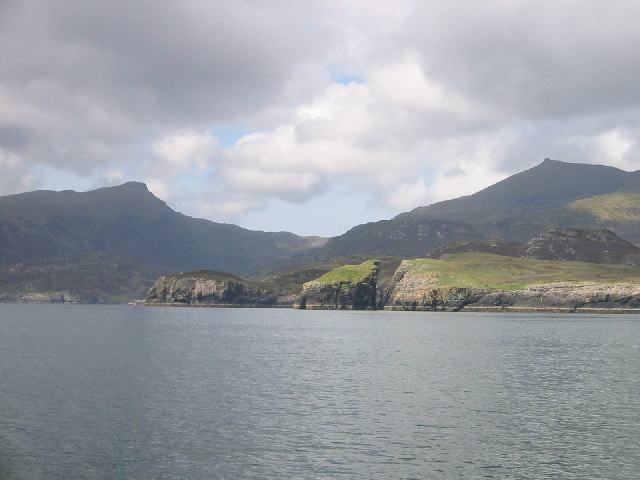
Looking west to Nicolson's Leap. In the background are Gèideabhal, also known as Beinn Mhòr, on the left, and Hecla on the right.

The west is machair (fertile low-lying coastal plain) with a continuous sandy beach, whilst the east coast is mountainous, with the peaks of Beinn Mhòr (Gèideabhal) at 620 metres (2,030 ft) and Hecla at 606 metres (1,988 ft). The island is linked to Eriskay and Benbecula by causeways.

There are numerous lochs and lochans, the largest of which is Loch Bì.

The main village on the island is Lochboisdale (Loch Baghasdail), from which Caledonian MacBrayne operates ferries to Mallaig (Malaig) on the Scottish mainland (some sailings to Oban in winter when the only large vessel able to dock at Mallaig, MV Lord of the Isles, is covering elsewhere on the Calmac network for vessels in drydock, or in drydock herself). The company previously operated services to Castlebay (Bàgh a' Chaisteil) on Barra, however as of the 2016 fleet reshuffle these have been removed. There is a separate service to Ardmhòr (Barra) operating from Eriskay numerous times a day. Smaller settlements include Daliburgh (Dalabrog), Howmore (Tobha Mòr) and Ludag (An Lùdag).

== Climate ==
South Uist has an oceanic climate (Köppen: Cfb).

Climate data for South Uist Range (4 m or 13 ft asl, averages 1991–2020)
Month	Jan	Feb	Mar	Apr	May	Jun	Jul	Aug	Sep	Oct	Nov	Dec	Year
Record high °C (°F)	13.5 (56.3)	12.9 (55.2)	16.2 (61.2)	22.3 (72.1)	24.3 (75.7)	25.3 (77.5)	26.4 (79.5)	25.6 (78.1)	24.3 (75.7)	19.3 (66.7)	17.5 (63.5)	13.9 (57.0)	26.4 (79.5)
Mean daily maximum °C (°F)	7.9 (46.2)	7.7 (45.9)	8.7 (47.7)	10.5 (50.9)	13.0 (55.4)	14.8 (58.6)	16.2 (61.2)	16.3 (61.3)	15.0 (59.0)	12.3 (54.1)	9.9 (49.8)	8.3 (46.9)	11.7 (53.1)
Daily mean °C (°F)	5.7 (42.3)	5.5 (41.9)	6.4 (43.5)	8.0 (46.4)	10.2 (50.4)	12.3 (54.1)	13.8 (56.8)	14.0 (57.2)	12.7 (54.9)	10.1 (50.2)	7.7 (45.9)	6.0 (42.8)	9.4 (48.9)
Mean daily minimum °C (°F)	3.5 (38.3)	3.3 (37.9)	4.1 (39.4)	5.5 (41.9)	7.5 (45.5)	9.9 (49.8)	11.5 (52.7)	11.7 (53.1)	10.4 (50.7)	7.9 (46.2)	5.5 (41.9)	3.7 (38.7)	7.0 (44.6)
Record low °C (°F)	−5.0 (23.0)	−3.5 (25.7)	−5.2 (22.6)	−3.4 (25.9)	0.1 (32.2)	3.6 (38.5)	5.0 (41.0)	4.7 (40.5)	2.6 (36.7)	0.3 (32.5)	−4.5 (23.9)	−6.5 (20.3)	−6.5 (20.3)
Average precipitation mm (inches)	136.7 (5.38)	102.9 (4.05)	95.6 (3.76)	68.3 (2.69)	64.5 (2.54)	65.0 (2.56)	77.5 (3.05)	100.7 (3.96)	97.5 (3.84)	132.1 (5.20)	127.8 (5.03)	133.0 (5.24)	1,201.6 (47.31)
Average precipitation days (≥ 1.0 mm)	21.5	18.1	17.8	13.6	13.0	12.8	14.5	16.7	15.8	19.7	21.0	20.8	205.2
Source 1: Met Office
Source 2: Starlings Roost Weather

== Etymology ==
Mac an Tàilleir (2003) suggests that the derivation of Uist may be "corn island". However, whilst noting that the vist ending would have been familiar to speakers of Old Norse as meaning "dwelling", Gammeltoft (2007) says that the word is "of non-Gaelic origin" and that it reveals itself as one of a number of "foreign place-names having undergone adaptation in Old Norse". In contrast, Clancy (2018) has argued that Ívist itself is an Old Norse calque on an earlier Gaelic name, *Ibuid or Ibdaig, which corresponds to Ptolemy’s Eboudai. (Note: Coates (2006) linked the names Uist and Ibiza, an island in the Mediterranean, arguing for an origin in Semitic meaning "island of a fragrant plant", acknowledging the possibility the name being subject to the influence of Norse ívist.)

== History ==
=== Early history ===
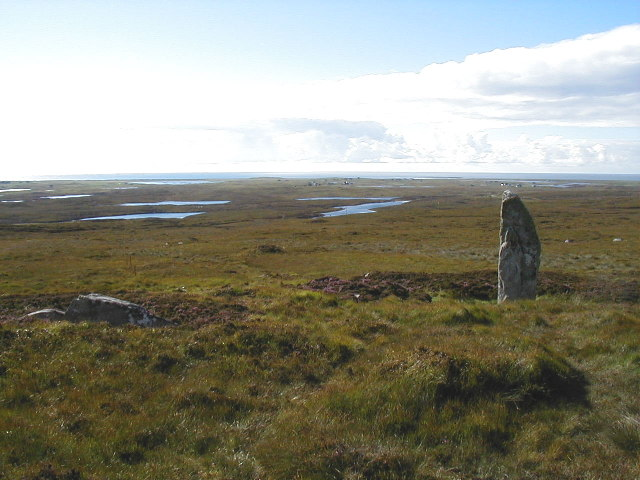
The neolithic monument at Beinn A' Charra

South Uist was clearly home to a thriving Neolithic community. There are several Neolithic remains, such as burial cairns, (Note: By the early 21st century, cairns had been identified at Sig More, Glac Hukarvat, Reineval, Barp Frobost, Loch a'Bharp and Leaval. A variant style was found at Dun Trossary, which is a long horned cairn. Most are in poor condition, but the cairn at Reineval is exceptionally well-preserved.) and a small number of standing stones, of which the largest—standing 17 feet (5.2 m) tall—is in the centre of the island, at the northern edge of Beinn A' Charra. Occupation continued into the Chalcolithic, as evidenced by a number of Beaker finds throughout the island.

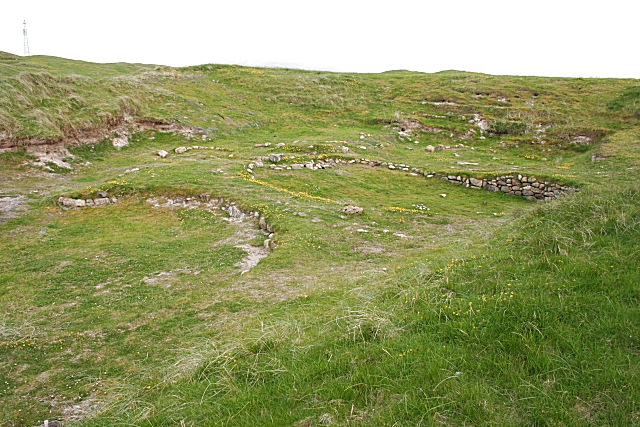
Cladh Hallan roundhouses

Later in the Bronze Age, a man was mummified, (Note: ~1600 BC) and placed on display at Cladh Hallan, parts occasionally being replaced over the centuries; he was joined by a woman three hundred years later. Together they are the only known prehistoric mummies in the British Isles. Towards the end of the Bronze Age, the mummies were buried, (Note: in 1120BC, for reasons which are now unknown) and a row of roundhouses built on top of them.

Burials underneath buildings during this time are seen elsewhere on South Uist. At Hornish Point (Cnoc Mòr) a burial was found under a roundhouse, consisting of an individual, likely male and aged 12. The skeleton had been dismembered, probably some time after death when the body was partly decomposed. Cannibalism was ruled out as there were none of the marks of skinning, filleting and butchering which would be expected if it was cannibalism.

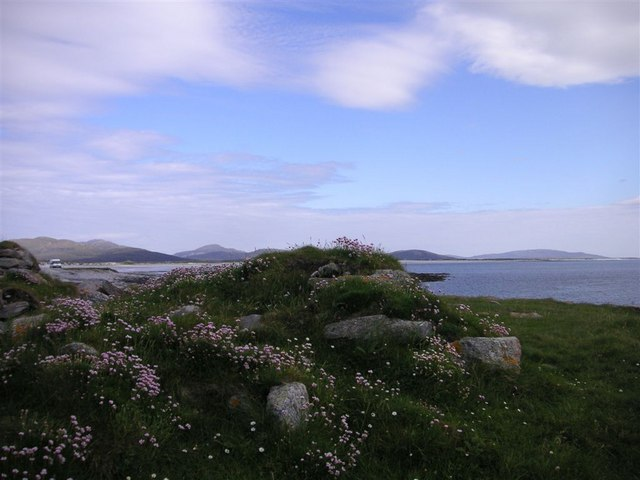
The remains of Dun Vulan (Note: It is the first floor which is exposed; the ground floor lies buried beneath the surface, and the entrance passage remains intact.)

Cladh Hallan was not abandoned until the late Iron Age. At around that time, in the 2nd century BC, a broch was built at Dun Vulan; archeological investigation suggests the inhabitants often ate pork. After the 2nd century AD, the Dun Vulan broch was converted into a three-roomed house. At a similar time, a wheelhouse was constructed at Kilpheder; within a cupboard (in the wheelhouse) was found an enameled bronze brooch, of a style fashionable in the Roman Britain of 150 AD. (Note: A photograph can be found here, by entering the search term "000-100-039-059-C")

=== Kingdom of the Isles ===
In the 9th century, Vikings invaded South Uist, along with the rest of the Hebrides, and the Gaelic kingdom of Dál Riata to the south, and established the Kingdom of the Isles throughout these lands. A short Ogham inscription has been found in Bornish, inscribed on a piece of animal bone, dating from this era; it is thought that the Vikings used it as a gaming token, or perhaps for sortilege.

Following Norwegian unification under King Harold Fairhair, the Kingdom of the Isles was declared a crown dependency by the Norwegian king; to the Norwegians it was Suðreyjar (meaning southern isles). Malcolm III of Scotland acknowledged in writing that Suðreyjar was under Norwegian control, and later King Edgar was forced to quitclaim in favour of the invaders. At Kilpheder, the roundhouses were abandoned in favour of Norse longhouses; (Note: the substantial remains of which were largely destroyed by a storm in the early 21st century) at Bornish, a few miles to the north, a more substantial Norse settlement was built. (Note: containing at least 20 houses; the largest Norse settlement yet found in modern Scotland) As indicated by archaeological finds, residents had access to a wide trading network, stretching throughout the Norwegian empire, as well as adjacent lands like Ireland.

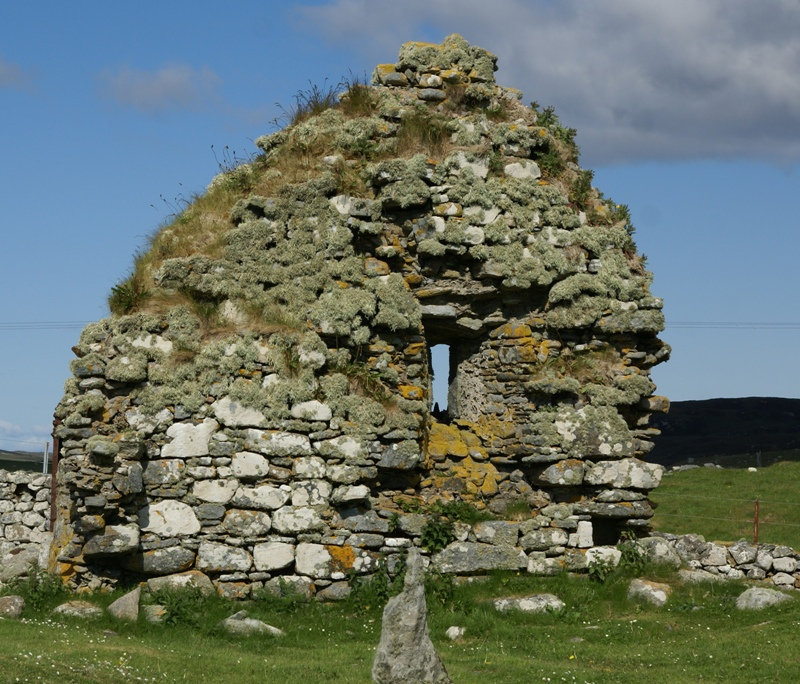
The remains of the early 13th-century Howmore monastery

However, in the mid-12th century, Somerled, a Norse-Gael of uncertain origin, launched a coup, which made Suðreyjar independent of Norwegian domination. Following his death, Norwegian authority was nominally restored, but in practice the kingdom was divided between Somerled's heirs (Clann Somhairle), and the dynasty that Somerled had deposed (the Crovan dynasty). The final return of Scotland's territory was to follow. The MacRory, a branch of Somerled's heirs, ruled Uist, as well as Barra, Eigg, Rùm, the Rough Bounds, Bute, Arran and northern Jura. (Note: Muck and Canna were ruled by the Bishop of the Isles and Abbot of Iona, respectively) A small monastery was established at Howmore. (Note: St. Dermot's Chapel and parts of the Clan Ranald chapel date from this period)

=== Lordships ===
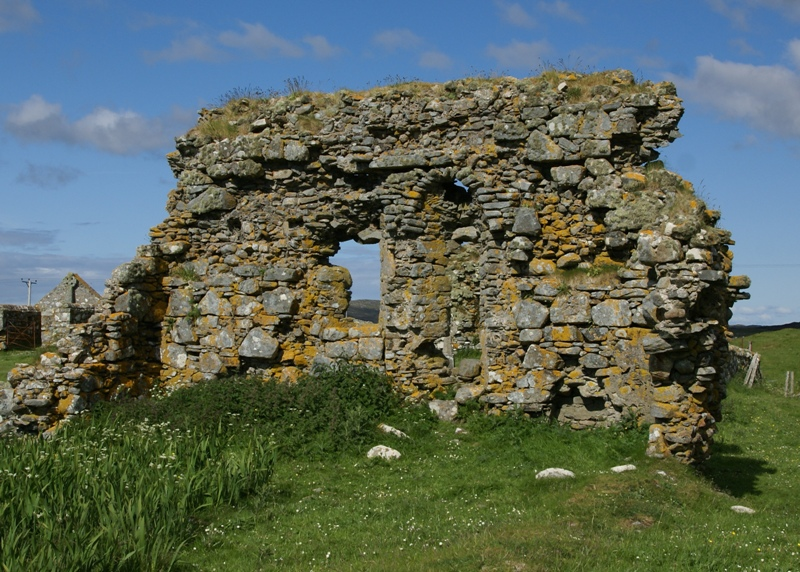
The remains of the late 13th-century parish church

In the 13th century, despite Edgar's quitclaim, Scottish forces attempted to restore parts of Suðreyjar to Scotland, culminating in the Battle of Largs. In 1266, the matter was settled by the Treaty of Perth, which acknowledged the whole of Suðreyjar to Scotland, in exchange for a compensatory sum of money. (Note: 4,000 marks) The Treaty expressly preserved the status of the rulers of Suðreyjar; the MacRory lands, excepting Bute, Arran, and Jura, became the Lordship of Garmoran, a quasi-independent crown dependency. Following this, the Norse longhouses were gradually abandoned, in favour of new Blackhouses (Note: in which the space was shared with livestock,) and a new parish church was built at Howmore for South Uist. (Note: Now called the big church (Teampall Mòr in Gaelic))

At the turn of the century, William I had created the position of Sheriff of Inverness, to be responsible for the Scottish highlands, which now extended to Garmoran. In 1293, however, king John Balliol established the Sheriffdom of Skye, which included the Outer Hebrides. Nevertheless, following his usurpation, the Skye sheriffdom ceased to be mentioned, (Note: in surviving records, at least) and the Garmoran lordship (including Uist) was confirmed to the MacRory leader. In 1343, King David II issued a further charter for this to the latter's son.

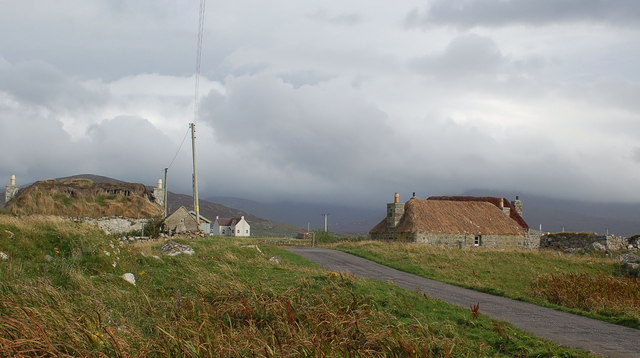
Blackhouses in Howmore

Just three years later (Note: 1346) the sole surviving MacRory heir was Amy of Garmoran. The southern parts of the Kingdom of the Isles had become the Lordship of the Isles, ruled by the MacDonalds (another group of Somerled's descendants). Amy married the MacDonald leader, John of Islay, but a decade later he divorced her, and married the king's niece instead (in return for a substantial dowry). As part of the divorce, John deprived his eldest son, Ranald, of the ability to inherit the Lordship of the Isles, in favour of a son by his new wife. As compensation, John granted Lordship of Uist to Ranald's younger brother Godfrey, while making Ranald Lord of the remainder of Garmoran.

However, on Ranald's death, disputes between Godfrey and his nephews (the elder of whom founded Clan Ranald) led to an enormous amount of violent feuding. In 1427, frustrated with the level of violence in the Highlands, King James I demanded that Highland leaders should attend a meeting at Inverness. On arrival, many of the leaders were seized and imprisoned; Alexander MacGorrie, son of Godfrey, was considered to be one of the two most reprehensible, and after a quick show trial, was immediately executed. King James declared the Lordship of Uist forfeit.

=== Fracture ===
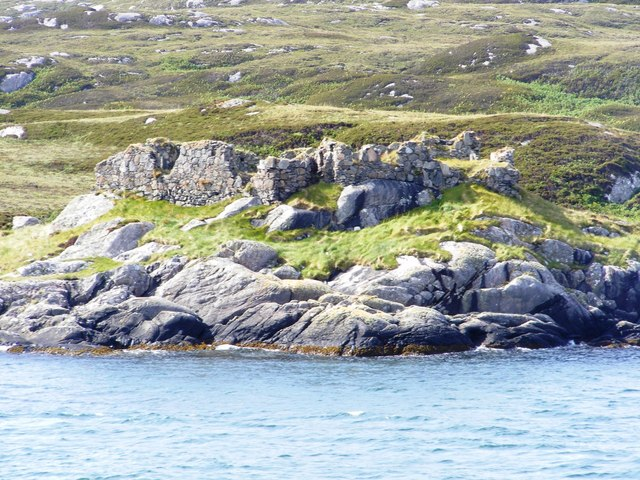
Calvay Castle, in Loch Boisdale

Following the forfeiture, and in that same year, the Lord of the Isles granted Lairdship of the southern third of South Uist (traditionally called Lochboisdale (Note: , after Lochboisdale, which forms its northern boundary)), together with Barra, to Giolla Adhamhnáin mac Néill, leader of the MacNeils. At around this time Calvay Castle was built, guarding Lochboisdale.

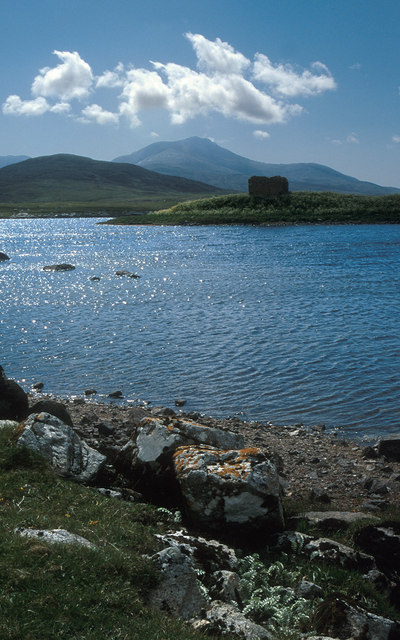
Caisteal Bheagram in Drimsdale

The remainder of South Uist remained with the Scottish crown until 1469, when James III granted Lairdship of it to John of Ross, the Lord of the Isles; in turn, John passed it to his own half-brother, Hugh of Sleat (the grant to Hugh was later confirmed by the king—James IV—in a 1493 charter). Hugh died a few years later, in 1498, and for reasons that are not remotely clear, his son—John of Sleat—immediately resigned, transferring all authority to the king.

On 3 August that same year, king James IV awarded the central third of South Uist (traditionally known as Kilpheder (Note: after its main settlement, Kilpheder)), by charter to Ranald Bane, leader of Clan Ranald. Two days later, (Note: 5 August) the king gave Ranald Bane a charter for the northern third (traditionally known as Skirhough (Note: after its main settlement, Howmore; Sgire is Gaelic for district)) as well. Ranald Bane, or his heirs, built Casteal Bheagram, on Loch an Eilean in Skirhough, as their local stronghold. (Note: Ranald's grandchildren, and their heirs, used Borve Castle, on Benbecula, as their main residence in Uist; Caisteal Bheagram, as a small tower, was more useful merely as a refuge, and vantage point.)

=== John Moidartach and his sons ===
Some time after Ranald Bane's nephew, John Moidartach, (Note: Moidartach refers to Moidart) succeeded as laird, he fell out of favour with King James V. (Note: Surviving records do not explain why.) By 1538, James had transferred lairdship of Kilpheder to John's younger half-brother, Farquhar; (Note: Though they shared the same father, Farquhar's mother was Marion MacIntosh, while the name of John's mother was Dorothy (her surname is unknown).) the king gave him Skirhough shortly afterwards. In 1563, Farquhar sold his portion of South Uist to a distant relation, James MacDonald (heir of the second son of John of Islay); (Note: for 2,000 marks) that same year, Mary, Queen of Scots, issued a charter confirming James MacDonald as laird of these lands.

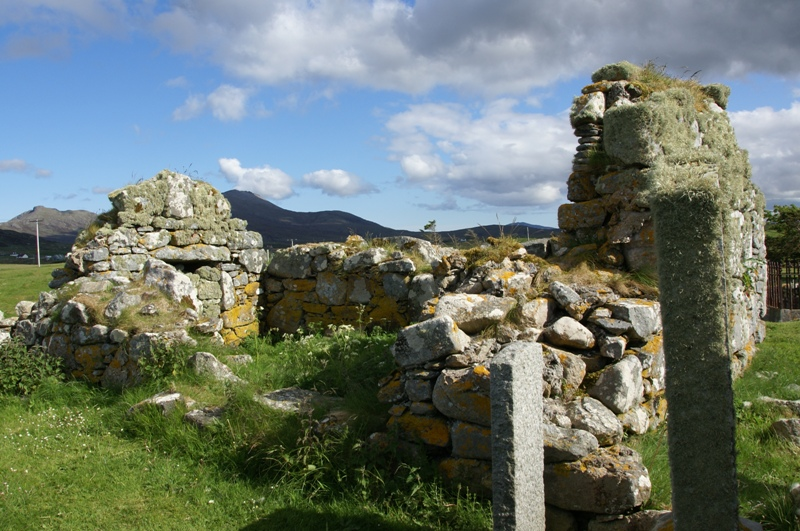
The Clan Ranald chapel at Howmore

In the following year, Farquhar was murdered by John Moidartach's sons. The year after that, (Note: 1565) as opponents of the Scottish reformation, Moidartach and his family took the side of the Queen during the Chaseabout Raid, and were consequently back in royal favour; the Queen prohibited them from being punished for Farquhar's murder. By the last decades of the century, John Moidartach had obtained a practical hold on Farquhar's former lands, though seemingly as a tenant of James MacDonald's heirs. In 1584 John died, and was buried at Howmore; a decorated stone from the site (the Clanranald Stone) is thought to have been his headstone. (Note: Following the theft of the stone, in the 1990s, it is now located at the Kildonan museum.)

In 1596, concerned by the active involvement of highland leaders in Irish rebellions against Queen Elizabeth of England, king James VI of Scotland (Elizabeth's heir) demanded that they send well-armed men, as well as attending themselves, to meet him at Dumbarton on 1 August, and produce the charters for their land. As neither John Moidartach's heirs, nor those of James MacDonald, did so, Skirhough and Kilpheder became forfeit, by the corresponding Act of Parliament. Consequently, the king awarded them to Donald Gorm Mòr, the heir of Hugh of Sleat, as a reward; he had been one of the few Highland leaders who obeyed the king's summons. Donald Gorm Mòr subinfeudated Skirhough and Kilpheder back to Clan Ranald, for £46 per annum.

=== Reunification ===
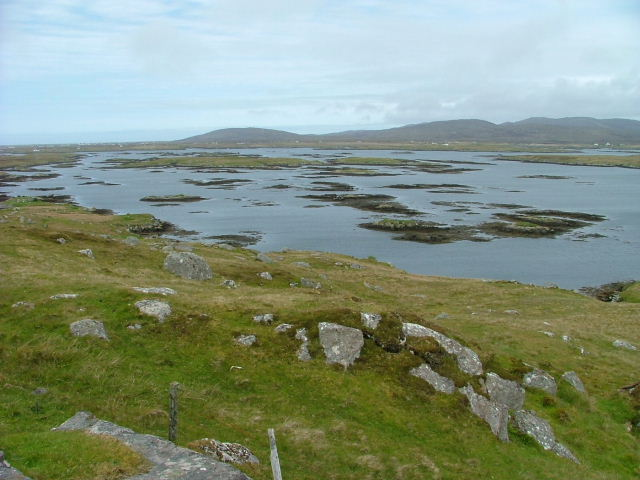
Loch Boisdale

The leader of the MacNeils did not submit to the 1609 Statutes of Iona. Using this as justification, Clan Ranald drove the MacNeils out of Lochboisdale, and were subsequently awarded a charter for it, in 1610. In 1622, Donald Gorm Mòr's successor, Donald Gorm Òg, (Note: Og means the younger) is found requesting that the Privy Council physically punish the Clan Ranald leadership for not removing their families and tenants from Skirhough; presumably they hadn't been paying the rent. By way of settlement of the dispute, (Note: agreed at the Chanonry of Ross) Donald Gorm Og was granted lairdship over Lochboisdale as well; thus Donald Gorm Og became laird of the whole of South Uist, while Clan Ranald held it as his feudal vassals.

In 1633, Donald Gorm Òg decided to simply sell lairdship of South Uist to the Earl of Argyll; (Note: for 26,921 marks, 10 shillings, and 8 pence) in January 1634, this arrangement was confirmed by a crown charter. In 1661, as a leading opponent of king Charles I, the Earl's son — the Marquess of Argyll — was convicted of high treason, and his lands became forfeit. Thus, in 1673, it was the king demanding that Clan Ranald pay their outstanding rent for South Uist.

=== Debt, poverty and loss ===
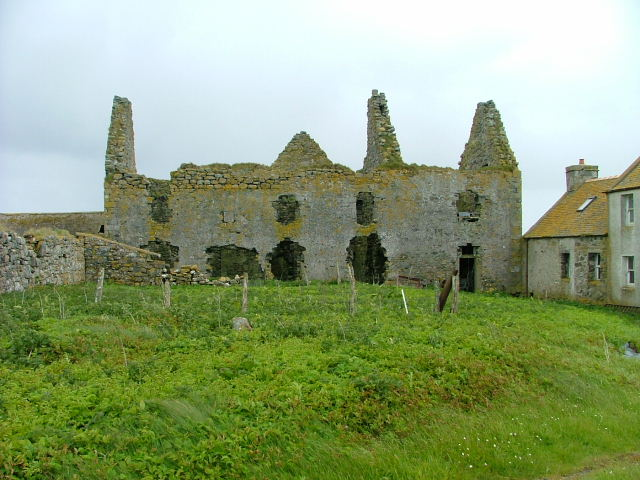
The ruins of Ormaclete Castle.

In 1701, Ailean Dearg MacDonald, the Chief of Clan MacDonald of Clanranald, built Ormaclete Castle as his new main residence in South Uist. According to local Seanchaidh Angus MacLellan, Ailean Dearg is said to have gone into considerable debt in order to build the castle and, according to the oral tradition, once played a prank that terrified his many creditors when they visited South Uist, which resulted in his debts all being cancelled and his credit restored.

In 1715, some venison caught fire in the kitchen, which led to the whole castle burning down. At the time, like many of the other Clan Donald leaders, Ailean Dearg was away fighting in the Jacobite rising of 1715. A few days after the fire, Ailean Dearg was fighting on the right wing of the Jacobite Army at the Battle of Sheriffmuir when he fell mortally wounded. Ailean Dearg was, according to John Lorne Campbell, "killed, it was popularly said, by a silver bullet that negatived the charm he used to wear". Alasdair Dubh, 11th Chief of Clan MacDonald of Glengarry then managed to rally the faltering warriors of Clan Donald by throwing up his blue bonnet and crying (Scottish Gaelic: "Buillean an-diugh, tuiream a-màireach"!) ("Blows today, mourning tomorrow!"). After these events, the Chiefs of Clan Ranald moved their main residence back to Benbecula.

During the time when the Chiefs of Clanranald were absentee landlords, the estate factor lived, according to Angus MacLellan, in a house at Loch Eynort on a site still known as (Scottish Gaelic: Rubha Taigh a' Mhàil), or "The Rent House Point."

During the Jacobite rising of 1745, Ranald MacDonald, the son of the Clan Ranald leader, (Note: who was also called Ranald) amassed large amounts of debt by funding the Jacobite army. (Note: his father, by contrast, was unwilling to actively support the campaign) In the following year, Bonnie Prince Charlie was able to hide at Calvay Castle, after fleeing from the Battle of Culloden, until he was able to escape with the aid of Flora MacDonald. Though an act of attainder (and forfeit) was subsequently passed against Ranald, it had no effect, due to accidentally naming him as Donald MacDonald.

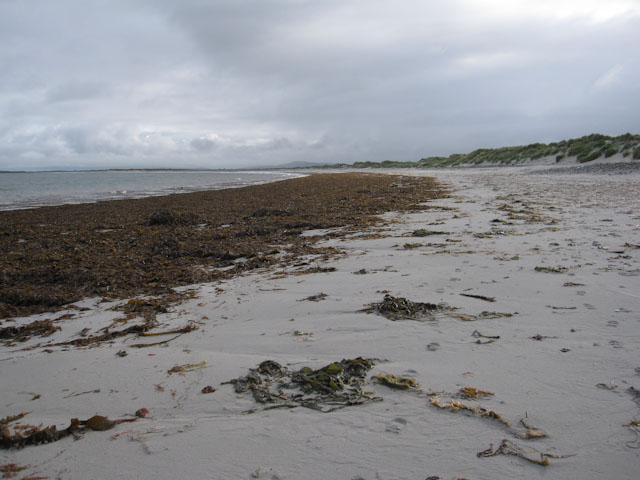
Kelp on the Bornish beach

Ranald's debts proved burdensome for his family, but his grandson, Ranald George MacDonald, was able to keep them at bay thanks to the Napoleonic Wars; the wars had restricted the supply of certain minerals, turning the production of soda ash by burning kelp into a highly profitable activity. Kelp harvesting (and burning) became one of the principle economic activities of the population of South Uist, but when the wars ended, competition from imported barilla resulted in the kelp price collapsing. In 1837, facing bankruptcy, Ranald sold South Uist to Lt. Colonel John Gordon of Cluny.

Already accustomed to treating people as slaves, and seeing the financial advantages to livestock farming, Gordon was ruthless, evicting the population with short notice. On 11 August 1851, he demanded that everyone in South Uist attend a public meeting at Lochboisdale; according to an eyewitness, (Note: Catherine MacPhee) he dragged the attendees from the meeting, sometimes in handcuffs, and threw then onto waiting ships, like cattle. Having "cleared" much of the land, he replaced the population with flocks of Blackface sheep, bringing in Lowland farmers to care for them. The former population largely moved to Canada; the remaining populace of South Uist represented less than half of the 1841 total. (Note: which was 5093)

As both Col. Gordon and his factors considered the nearby island of Eriskay "agriculturally worthless", accordingly used the island as a dumping ground for evicted tenants from his many other island estates throughout the southern Outer Hebrides. For the most part the newly arrived islanders of Eriskay, which drastically multiplied the island's population, belonged overwhelmingly to the Catholic Church in Scotland and had their family roots across the Sound of Barra in South Uist.

=== Later history ===
Lochboisdale became a major herring port later in the 19th century. In 1889, counties were formally created in Scotland, on shrieval boundaries, by a dedicated Local Government Act; South Uist therefore became part of the new county of Inverness. Following late 20th-century reforms, South Uist became part of the Highland Region. The population level remained steady after the 19th-century clearances (in 2004 it was 2,285). Following a series of different landowners, South Uist was owned by South Uist Estates Ltd from 1960. In 2006, the local community bought all of the company's shares, via the special purpose vehicle Sealladh na Beinne Mòire.

=== MOD Hebrides ===
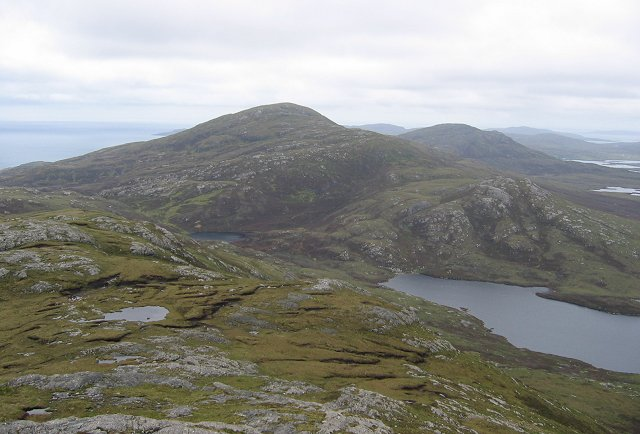
East Coast

In the north west of the island at (57°20′N 07°20′W), a missile testing range was built in 1957–58 to launch the MGM-5 Corporal missile, Britain and America's first guided nuclear weapon. This development went ahead despite significant protests, some locals expressing concern that the Scottish Gaelic language would not survive the influx of English-speaking Army personnel. The British Government claimed that there was an 'overriding national interest' in establishing a training range for their newly purchased Corporal, a weapon that was to be at the front line of Cold War defence. The Corporal missile was tested from 1959 to 1963, before giving way to MGM-29 Sergeant and MGM-52 Lance tactical nuclear missiles. The 'rocket range' as it is known locally has also been used to test high-altitude research rockets, Skua and Petrel. Local opposition to the range inspired the 1957 novel Rockets Galore by Compton Mackenzie, which was made into the film Rockets Galore!.

MOD Hebrides is still owned by the MoD operated by QinetiQ as a testing facility for missile systems such as the surface-to-air Rapier missile and unmanned aerial vehicles.

== Ownership of South Uist ==
After a protracted campaign, South Uist residents took control of the island on 30 November 2006 in Scotland's biggest community land buyout to date. The previous landowners, a sporting syndicate, sold the assets of the 92,000-acre (370 km^{2}) estate for £4.5 million to a Community Company known as Stòras Uibhist, which was set up to purchase the land and to manage it. The buyout resulted in most of South Uist, and neighbouring Benbecula, and all of Eriskay coming under community control. The proposal for community ownership received the overwhelming support of the people of the islands, who "look forward to regenerating the local economy, reversing decline and depopulation, and reducing dependency, while remaining aware of the environmental needs, culture and history of the islands". The company claims its name—Stòras Uibhist (meaning 'Uist Resource')—symbolises hope for the future wealth and prosperity of the islands. The organisation's website states that Stòras Uibhist comprises South Uist Estates Ltd, South Uist Renewable Energy (the wind farm) and Lochboisdale Development Limited ("which is responsible for the newly built Marina in the port of Lochboisdale").

== Economy ==
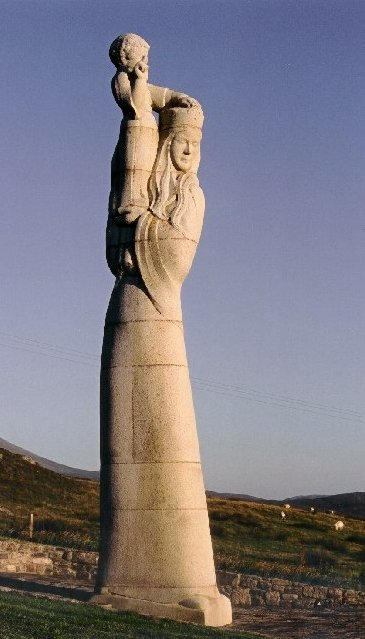
Our Lady of the Isles

Tourism is important to the island's economy and attractions include the Kildonan Museum, housing the 16th-century Clanranald Stone, and the ruins of the house where Flora MacDonald was born.

South Uist is home to the Askernish Golf Course. The oldest course in the Outer Hebrides, Askernish was designed by Old Tom Morris, who also worked on the Old Course at St Andrews. Morris was commissioned by Lady Gordon Cathcart in 1891. The Askernish course existed intact until the 1930s, but was partly destroyed to make way for an aircraft runway, then abandoned, and ultimately lost. Its identity remained hidden for many years before its apparent discovery, a claim disputed by some locals. Restoration of the course to Morris's original design was held up by disagreements with local crofters, but after legal challenges were resolved in the courts, the course opened in August 2008. The summer music school, Ceòlas, takes place every year from the first Sunday of July in Daliburgh School on the island. In 2019, it was estimated that the school contributed around £210,000 to the local economy. It is then followed by the local children's summer school, Fèis Tir a'Mhurain.

The Explore South Uist Web site discusses attractions to tourists: Loch Druidibeg a National Nature Reserve, the Cladh Hallan Roundhouses archaeological site, Ormacleit Castle (completed in 1708 and destroyed by fire in 1715), Uist Sculpture Trail "of seven commissioned works by artists", the Statue of Our Lady of the Isles, the Askernish Golf Course, Flora MacDonald's Monument, Kildonan Museum and Crafts and some Standing Stones. The community group owner of South Uist, the Stòras Uibhist, owns the Lochcarnan 6.9MW wind farm project which began operation in 2013. It is composed of three Enercon E-70 2.3MW turbines. In 2019, the operation required re-financing which was easily obtained. A spokesperson for Stòras Uibhist said that the wind farm is important because it "generates income we can reinvest back into the communities ... to boost the economy, protect local crofting practices and generate employment opportunities".

== Wildlife and conservation ==
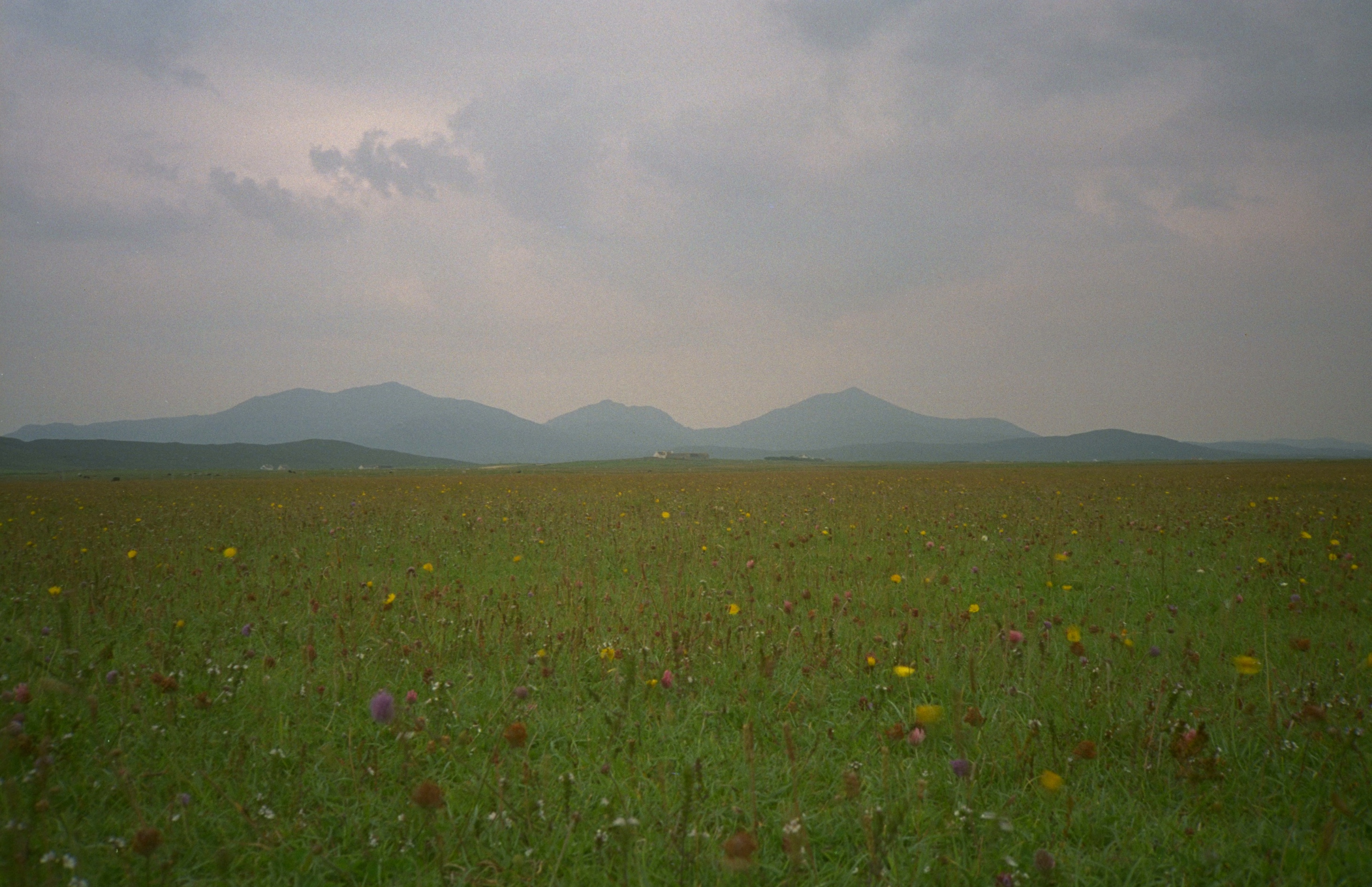
Flowering machair on South Uist

The west coast of South Uist is home to the most extensive cultivated machair system in Scotland, which is protected as protected a both a Special Area of Conservation and a Special Protection Area under the Natura 2000 programme. Over 200 species of flowering plants have been recorded on the reserve, some of which are nationally scarce. South Uist is considered the best place in the UK for the aquatic plant Slender Naiad (Najas flexilis), which is a European Protected Species. Nationally important populations of breeding waders are also present, including redshank, dunlin, lapwing and ringed plover. The island is also home to greylag geese on the lochs, and in summer corncrakes on the machair. Otters and hen harriers are also seen.

Loch Druidibeg in the north of the island was formerly (until 2012) a national nature reserve owned and managed by Scottish Natural Heritage (SNH). The area, which is now protected as a Site of Special Scientific Interest, covers 1,675 hectares of machair, bog, freshwater lochs, estuary, heather moorland and hill. Ownership of the SSSI was transferred from SNH to the local community-owned company Stòras Uibhist.

An area of the south west coast of the island is designated as the South Uist Machair National Scenic Area, one of 40 such areas in Scotland which are defined so as to identify areas of exceptional scenery and ensure its protection from inappropriate development. The designated area covers 13,314 ha in total, of which 6,289 ha is on land, with a further 7,025 ha being marine (i.e. below low tide level).

There has been considerable controversy over hedgehogs on South Uist. The animals are not native to the islands, having been introduced in the 1970s to reduce garden pests. It is claimed that they pose a threat to the eggs of ground-nesting wading birds on the island. In 2003 the Uist Wader Project — headed by Scottish Natural Heritage — began a cull of hedgehogs in the area. Following a campaign and concerns over animal welfare, this cull was called off in 2007; instead, hedgehogs are being captured and moved to mainland Scotland.

Along with the island's situation on the North Atlantic Ocean, its machair is considered to be one of the most vulnerable coasts in Scotland due to relative sea level rise and the potential effects of climate change. Specifically, research has shown that the most vulnerable areas include Ìochdar, Stoneybridge, Cille Pheadair, and Orasay.

== Gaelic ==
At the 2011 Census it was found that 1,888 Gaelic speakers live on South Uist and Benbecula, this being 60% of the two islands' population. 'Na Meadhoinean', Middle District in South Uist, is the strongest Gaelic-speaking community in the world, at 82%. The Gaelic dialect spoken is a Southern Hebridean dialect related to that of the rest of Uist and of Barra.

A local Gaelic folktale tells of how a seal came out of the sea to settle a boundary dispute between the communities of Lochboisdale and Kilpheder by showing the antagonists where the boundary line should lie.

== In popular culture ==
The 1962 television series, The Dark Island, was filmed in South Uist.

== Notable residents ==
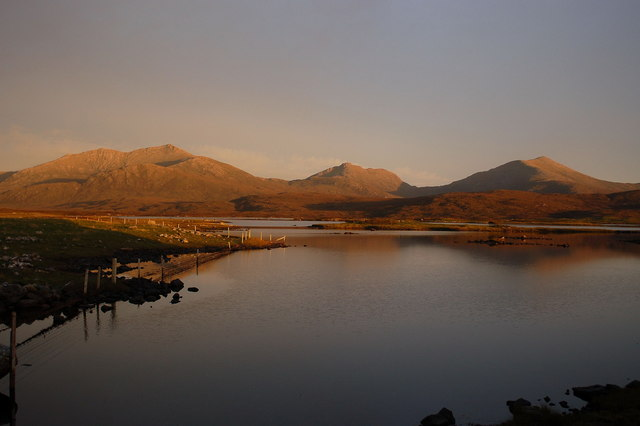
Stilligarry

- Angus Peter Campbell (born 1952) poet and novelist, as well as journalist, broadcaster and actor.
- Kathleen MacInnes (born 1969), singer, TV presenter and actress
- Danny Alexander (born 1972), Liberal Democrat Member of Parliament; lived at West Geirnish on South Uist for three years as a child
- Allan MacDonald (Scottish Gaelic: Maighstir Ailean) (1859–1905), Roman Catholic priest at Daliburgh, folklore collector
- Flora MacDonald (1722–1790), born at Milton; known for her help of the fugitive Prince Charles Edward Stuart after the Battle of Culloden
- Etienne Macdonald Although not a resident of the island, the family of this marshall of Napoléon Bonaparte originated in Howbeg, South Uist
- Angus McPhee (1916–1997), born at Iochdar; outsider artist
- Margaret Fay Shaw (1903–2004), American photographer and folklorist

== See also ==
- List of islands of Scotland
- Bun Sruth, a loch in the southeast
- Easaval, a hill in the south
- Iochdar, a hamlet on the west coast
- Kilaulay, a township on the northwest coast
- Ushenish, a headland on the east coast
- Scottish island names

== Bibliography ==
- Ballin Smith, Beverley; Taylor, Simon; and Williams, Gareth (2007) West over Sea: Studies in Scandinavian Sea-Borne Expansion and Settlement Before 1300. Leiden. Brill. ISBN 97890-04-15893-1
- Mac an Tàilleir, Iain (2003) Goireasan Cànain / Language Resources - Tadhail is Ionnsaich : Pàrlamaid na h-Alba. (pdf) Pàrlamaid na h-Alba. Retrieved 26 October 2025.
