= Lochboisdale =

Village and port in Scotland

Coordinates: 57.154°N 7.309°W

Lochboisdale: Scottish Gaelic: Loch Baghasdail
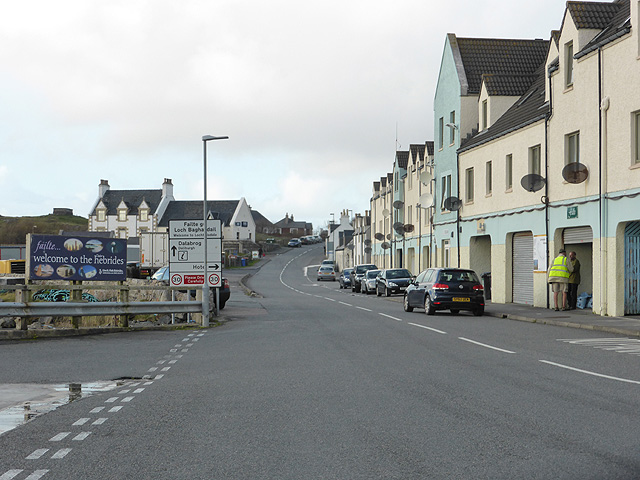
- The main road through Lochboisdale

- Location within the Outer Hebrides Lochboisdale (Outer Hebrides)
- Language: Scottish Gaelic; English
- OS grid reference: NF790195
  - Edinburgh: 177 mi (285 km)
  - London: 485 mi (781 km)
- Civil parish: South Uist
- Council area: Na h-Eileanan Siar
- Lieutenancy area: Western Isles
- Country: Scotland
- Sovereign state: United Kingdom
- Post town: ISLE OF SOUTH UIST
- Postcode district: HS8
- Dialling code: 01878
- Police: Scotland
- Fire: Scottish
- Ambulance: Scottish
- UK Parliament: Na h-Eileanan an Iar
- Scottish Parliament: Na h-Eileanan an Iar

Lochboisdale (Scottish Gaelic: Loch Baghasdail [ɫ̪ɔx ˈbɤːs̪t̪ɪl]) is the main village and port on the island of South Uist, Outer Hebrides, Scotland. Lochboisdale is within the parish of South Uist, and is situated on the shore of Loch Baghasdail at the southern end of the A865.

== History ==
The town profited from the herring boom in the 19th century, and a steamer pier was built in 1880. In 1905, a mission church was built, and by 1953, steamers were connecting Lochboisdale with Oban, Castlebay, Mallaig and Lochmaddy.

=== Fishing ===
The Annual Reports of the Fishery Board for Scotland provide an insight into the state of fishing from Loch Boisdale in the years before the First World War.

Fishery Statistics

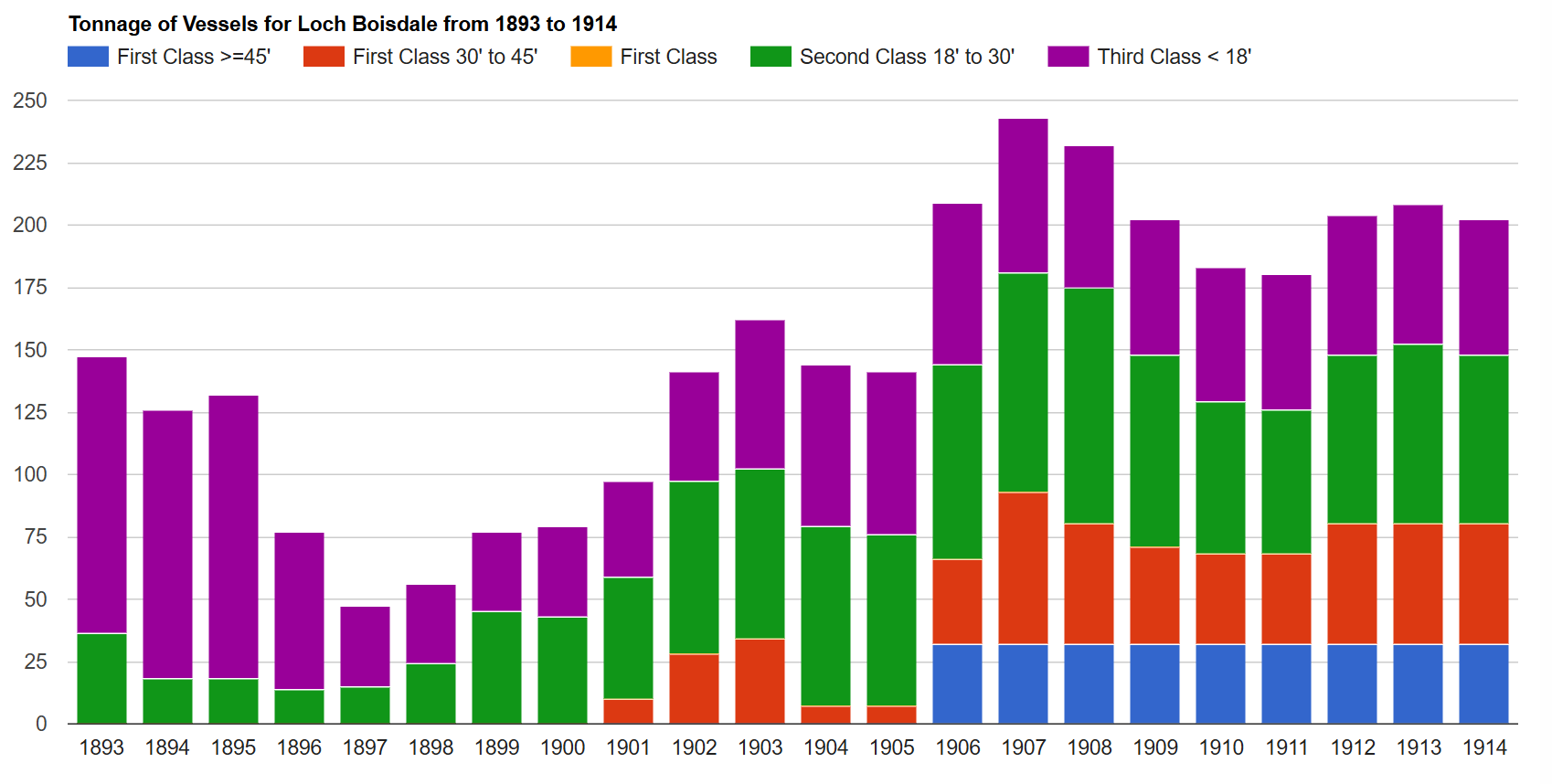
Tonnage of vessels

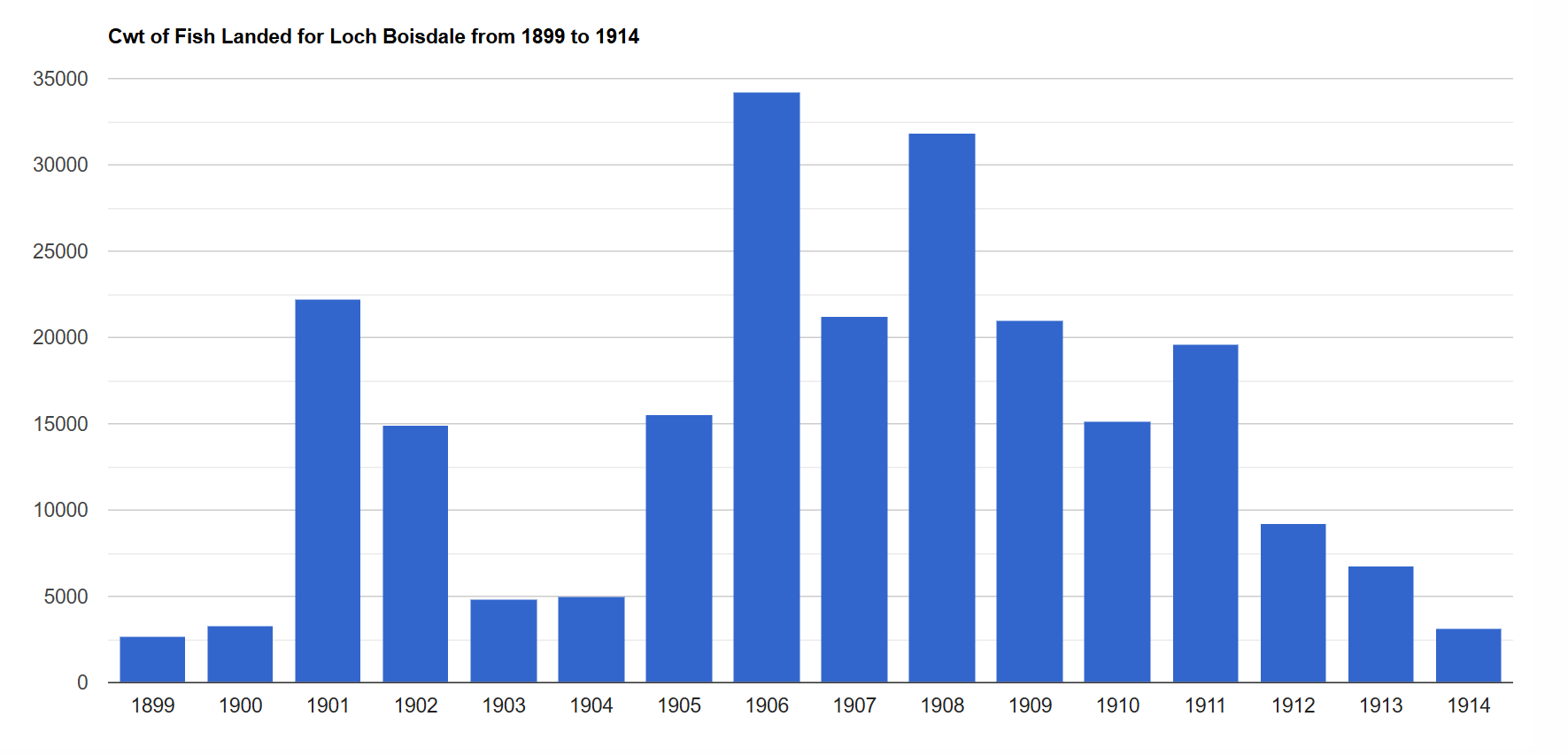
Cwt of fish landed

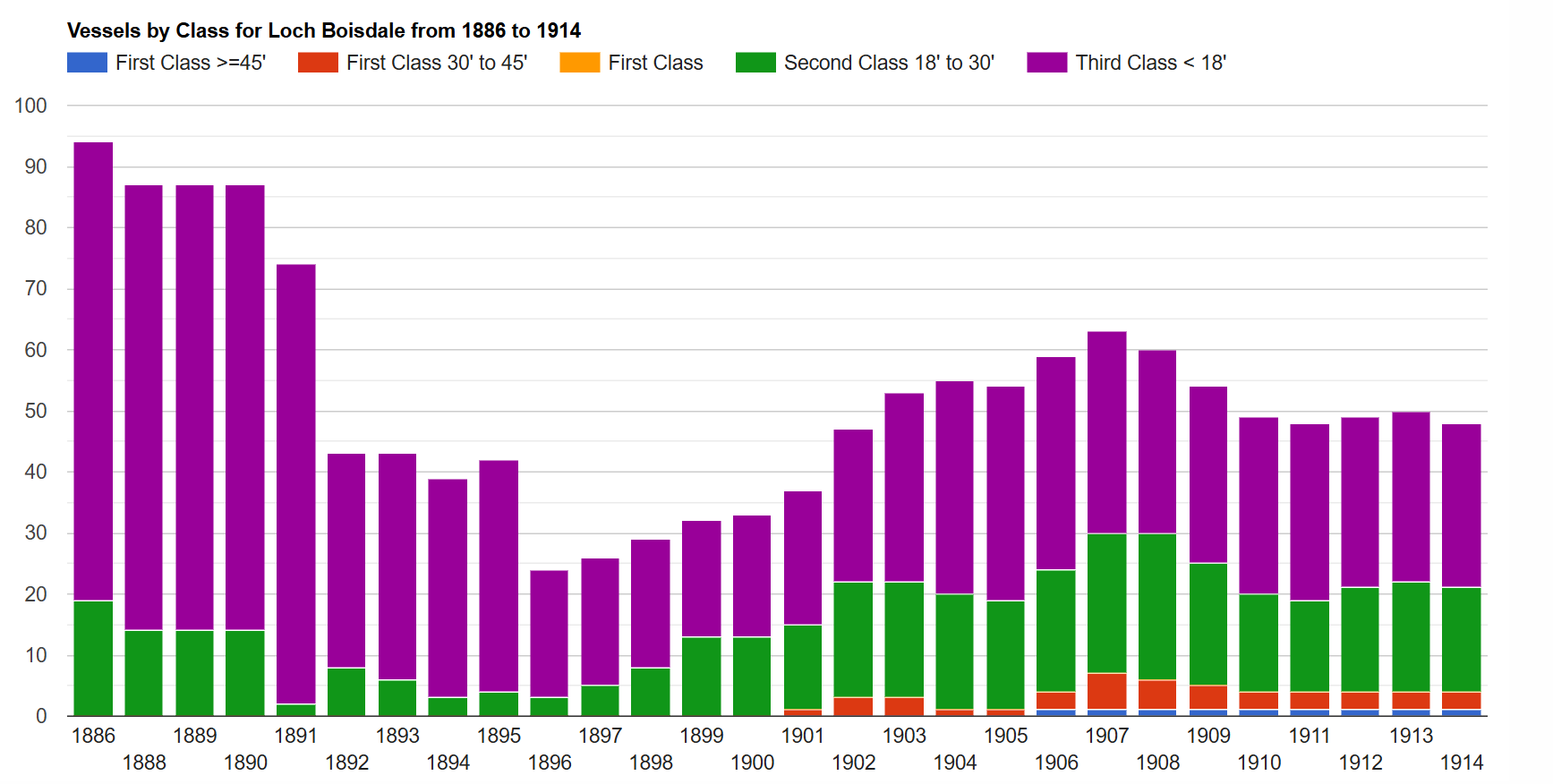
Vessels by class

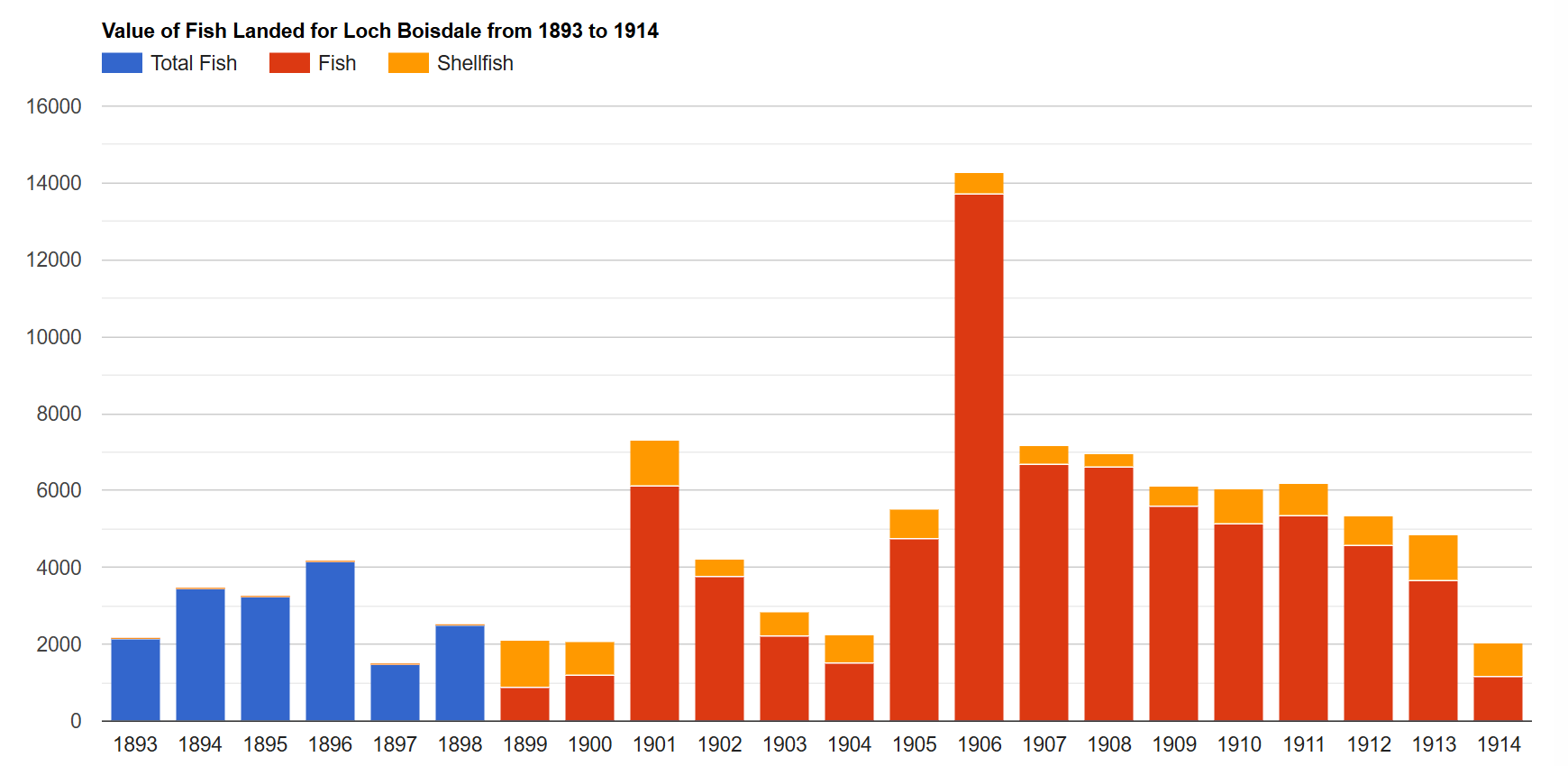
Value (£) of fish landed

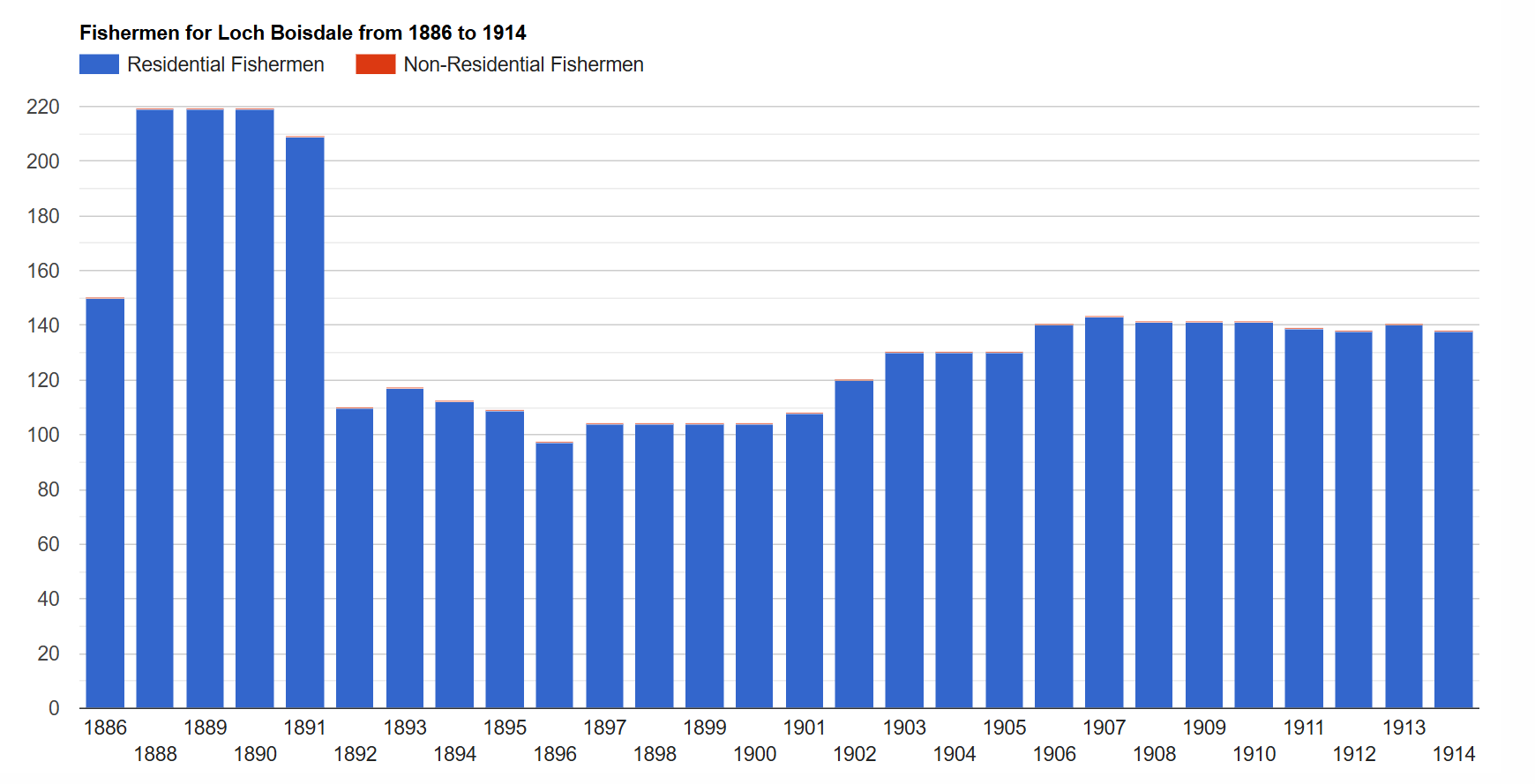
Fishermen

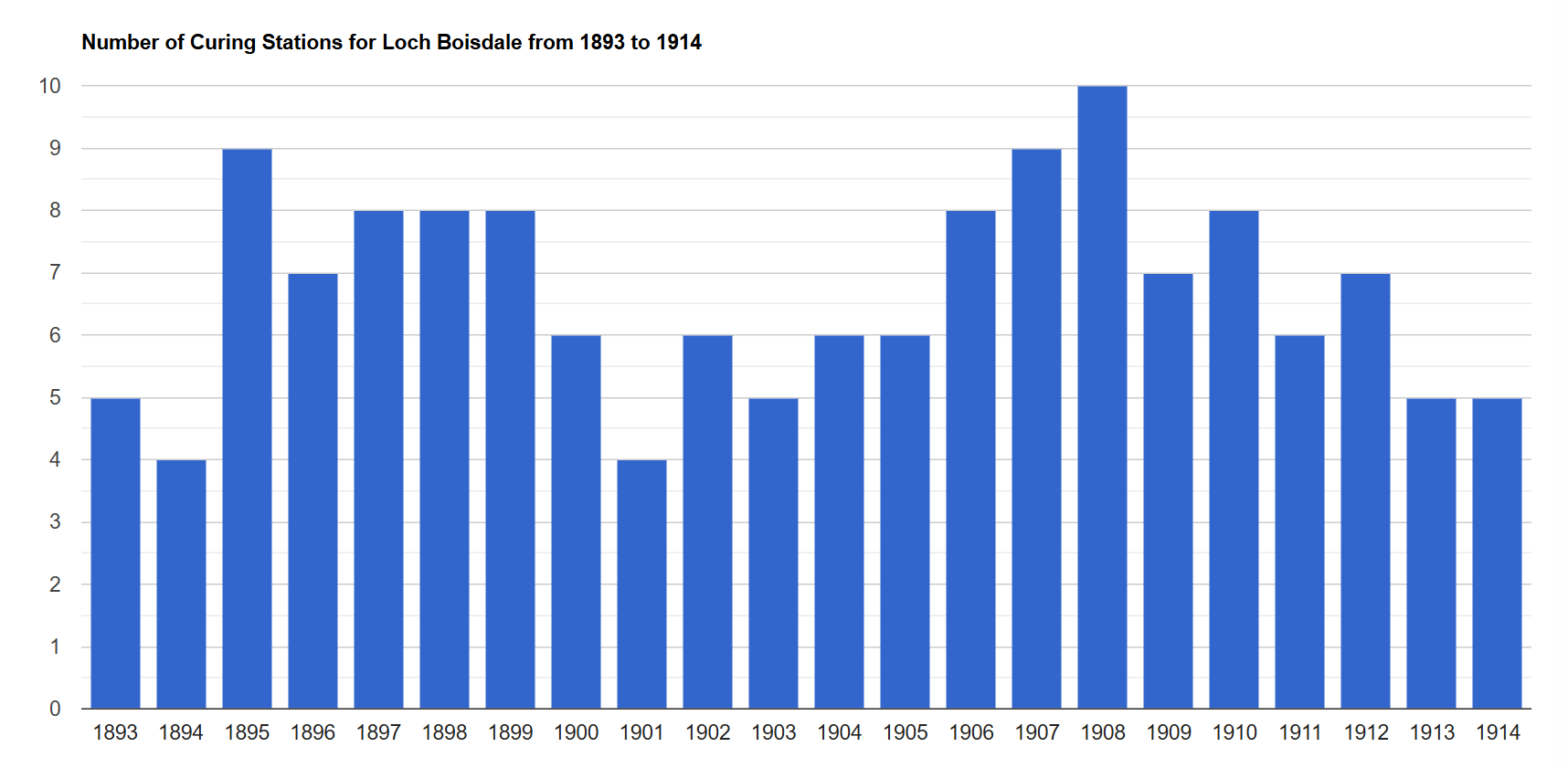
Number of curing stations

== Economy ==
Lochboisdale is the ferry terminal for the island of South Uist, with regular vehicle ferry services to Mallaig and, in the winter, Oban. The pier area has undergone a transformation; the old shop and surrounding buildings were either renovated or removed to provide new housing and commercial units for rent.

Lochboisdale Hotel, built in the late 19th century as a fishing hotel, is adjacent to the ferry terminal.

The whole village is within walking distance of the pier, and has a post office with a coffee shop and internet café. A bank (RBS) branch is also present in the village and has a 24h ATM, although the branch itself is only open once a week. By the pier is an all-purpose store called Fàilte (meaning welcome in the local Gaelic language).

Lochboisdale Development Limited have recently opened a new harbour on the small island of Gasaigh. This is about 1 km (1,100 yd) from the village, and is reached by two causeways. The harbour provides many facilities. Mooring licences are available for day visiting, monthly and seasonal berths, with inclusive use of the quayside facilities, WiFi, showers and laundry.

== Ferry service ==
Preceding station	Ferry	Following station
Terminus	Caledonian MacBrayne; South Uist Ferry	Oban (winter only)
Terminus	Caledonian MacBrayne; South Uist Ferry	Mallaig

== Trivia ==
London-based restaurant chain Boisdale is named after Lochboisdale, having been founded in 1987 by Ranald Macdonald, the eldest son of the 24th Chief of Clanranald.
