= Beinn Mhòr (South Uist) =

Mountain in Scotland

Beinn Mhòr or Geitaval
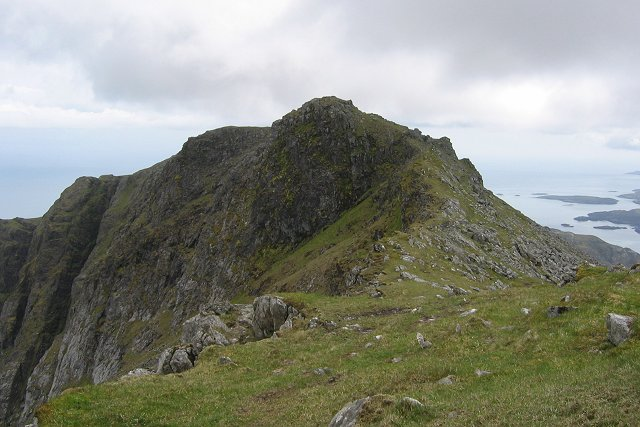
- The narrow summit ridge just below the top, June 2004

Highest point
- Elevation: 620 m (2,030 ft)
- Prominence: 620 m (2,030 ft)
- Listing: Graham, Marilyn
- Coordinates: 57°15′30″N 7°17′42″W

Naming
- English translation: Big mountain
- Language of name: Gaelic
- Pronunciation: Scottish Gaelic: [peɲ ˈvoːɾ]

Geography
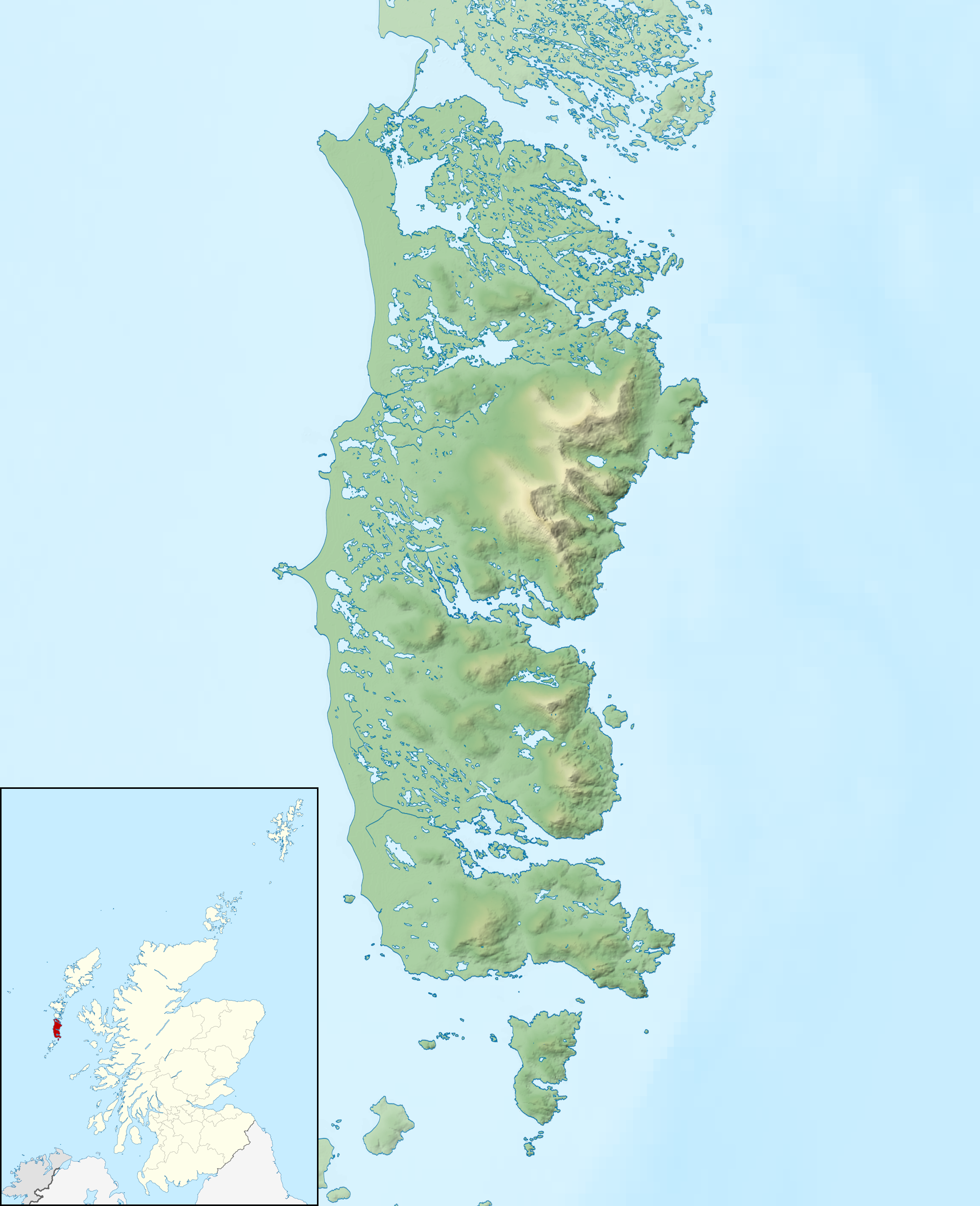
- Location within South Uist
- Location: South Uist, Outer Hebrides, Scotland
- OS grid: NF809310

Beinn Mhòr is a mountain on the island of South Uist in the Outer Hebrides of Scotland. With a height of 620 metres (2,034 ft), it is the highest point on the island and the most westerly mountain in Scotland and Great Britain. The name Beinn Mhòr is Gaelic for "big mountain". The correct name for the mountain in Gaelic is Gèideabhal.
