= Dàin do Eimhir =

- Short story by Sorley MacLean
- The cover of Dàin do Eimhir agus Dàin Eile
- Translator: Sorley MacLean, also Iain Crichton Smith
- Country: Scotland
- Language: Scottish Gaelic

Publication
- Published in: Dàin do Eimhir agus Dàin Eile
- Publication type: Poetry collection
- Publisher: William MacLennan
- Publication date: November 1943
- Published in English: 1971

Dàin do Eimhir (transl. Poems for Eimhir) is a sequence of sixty poems written in Scottish Gaelic by Sorley MacLean (Somhairle MacGill-Eain). Considered MacLean's masterpiece, the poems deal with intertwining themes of romantic love, landscape, history, and the Spanish Civil War, and are among the most important works ever written in Scottish Gaelic literature.

Forty-eight of the poems were published in MacLean's 1943 book Dàin do Eimhir agus Dàin Eile, and thirty-six were included in a 1971 English version translated by Iain Crichton Smith (Iain Mac a' Ghobhainn). MacLean asked his publisher to destroy the other twelve, but eleven survived and were published in 2002 in an annotated edition edited by Christopher Whyte.

== Background ==
Because of his socialist convictions, Sorley MacLean wanted to fight in the Spanish Republican Army during the Spanish Civil War, but was prevented by family circumstances. In 1937, MacLean, then working as an English teacher at Portree High School, met and fell in love with Nessa O’Shea, an Irish woman whom he believed to be romantically involved with a friend; MacLean did not approach her and she later married someone else. She inspired the poem An Roghainn (Dàin do Eimhir XXII) in which the narrator chooses between a love interest and going to fight in Spain. (Note: In interviews, MacLean emphasized that it was his family circumstances, not love affairs, which prevented him from going to Spain.) Later, he went to teach on the Isle of Mull, where the devastation from nineteenth-century clearances—in which many MacLeans had been evicted—had a profound effect on him. MacLean later said that "I believe Mull had much to do with my poetry: its physical beauty, so different from Skye’s, with the terrible imprint of the clearances on it, made it almost intolerable for a Gael." This period of his life has been described as "an immensely creative anguish", because it led to the writing of the Eimhir cycle and An Cuilthionn. He wrote most of the poetry that would become Dàin do Eimhir while teaching at Boroughmuir High School in Edinburgh, and in Hawick between 1939 and 1941.

== Publication ==
Four poems in the Eimhir song cycle (XXIX, IV, XIV and III) were published in a booklet titled 17 Poems for 6d: in Gaelic, Lowland Scots & English, containing MacLean's poetry along with that of Robert Garioch, in 1940. While MacLean was overseas, serving in the Royal Corps of Signals during the North African Campaign, he left his poetry with Scottish nationalist and poet Douglas Young, who had promised to help publish it. MacLean asked Young to destroy some of the poems, but Young refused. In November 1943, the poems were published as Dàin do Eimhir agus Dàin Eile. (Note: transl. Poems to Eimhir and Other Poems. The usual Gaelic would be "Dàin a dh'Eimhir", and it is possible that the title is a disguised pun.) Dàin do Eimhir was published primarily in Gaelic, but included English prose translations of some poems in a smaller font. Of the sixty poems in the Eimhir cycle, twelve were omitted because MacLean doubted their quality or were left out due to their personal content. The rest were numbered and ordered with Roman numerals. A few of the Eimhir poems were translated into Scots by Young and published the same year in Auntran Blads, along with some of George Campbell Hay (Deòrsa Mac Iain Dheòrsa)'s Gaelic poetry translated into Scots.

Although his poetry had a profound impact on the Gaelic-speaking world, it was not until the 1970s and 1980s that MacLean's work became accessible in English translation. In 1970, some of the Eimhir poems were reproduced in an anthology with three other poets, Four Points of the Saltire. Iain Crichton Smith published thirty-six of the poems in his English translation of Dàin do Eimhir in 1971. This edition only contained 36 of the poems in the Eimhir sequence, and did not reproduce the Gaelic originals. In 1989, a further compilation of his poetry, O Choille gu Bearradh / From Wood to Ridge: Collected Poems in Gaelic and English included many of the Eimhir poems and won MacLean lasting critical acclaim. The book was the Saltire Society Scottish Book of the Year for 1990, and MacLean won the McVitie's Prize for Scottish Writer of the Year. For a 2002 annotated edition, Christopher Whyte located and published all but one of the sixty poems.

== Analysis ==
The Eimhir cycle marked a sharp break in style and substance of Gaelic poetry from earlier eras. While simultaneously introducing Symbolism into Scottish Gaelic literature, MacLean emphasized the struggle between romantic love and duty, which was personified in the poet's difficulty in choosing between his love for a female figure, Eimhir, and what he sees as his moral obligation to volunteer for the International Brigades of the Spanish Republican Army during the Spanish Civil War. In the Ulster Cycle of Irish mythology, Eimhir is "the loveliest woman" in all Ireland and the wife of the legendary warrior and demigod Cuchulainn. MacLean said that the Eimhir of his poetry represented two real women in his life, Nessa O'Shea and an unnamed red-haired Scottish woman, but some critics have suggested that she actually represented three women, and, according to Christopher Whyte, there may have been as many as four. MacLean intentionally blurred the different Eimhirs together so that the individual women would not be distinguishable.

The book has been the subject of scholarly debate. Attempting to explain why MacLean's earlier poetry has had the greatest influence, Ruaraidh MacThòmais wrote that it is love poetry which is most timeless, while MacLean's Pro-Soviet political poetry has not aged as well. According to Maoilios Caimbeul, "There is not, and I doubt there will ever be, a series of love poems" that would have as much influence on Gaelic literature. (Note: "Chan eil, agus tha teagamh agam nach bi, sreath de dhàin ghaoil ann an litreachas na Gàidhlig a thig an uisge-stiùrach nan dàn seo.") However, this type of commentary has been criticized as an attempt to depoliticize MacLean's work. Seamus Heaney argued that Eimhir was similar to Beatrice in Dante's Divine Comedy, in that Eimhir "resolves at a symbolic level tensions which would otherwise be uncontainable or wasteful". Scottish poet Iain Mac a' Ghobhainn said, "there is a sense in which the Spanish Civil War does not form the background to these poems, but is the protagonist".

MacLean's work was innovative and influential because it juxtaposed elements from Gaelic history and tradition with icons from mainstream European history. He described his poetry as "radiating from Skye and the West Highlands to the whole of Europe". By this juxtaposition, he implicitly asserted the value of the Gaelic literary tradition and the right of the Gaels to participate as equals in the broader cultural landscape. According to Maoilios Caimbeul, MacLean's poetry is on the border between two worlds, but also the connection between them—the old, traditional Gaelic society and the wider, modern 20th century world.

Caimbeul writes that the poems "capture the uncertainty, pain, yearning, and the search for stability that are at the heart of Modernism". (Note: "Tha e a’ ciallachadh gu bheil na Dàin seo a’ glacadh a’ mhì-chinnt, am pian, an sireadh, an t-iarraidh airson nì seasmhach a tha aig cridhe Nuadhachais".) Summarizing the impact of the book, Professor Dòmhnall MacAmhlaigh wrote, "After the publication of this book Gaelic poetry could never be the same again."
