= List of Scottish Gaelic periodicals =

This is a list of periodicals in Scottish Gaelic.

== List ==
=== Scottish Gaelic periodicals ===
- Magazine of An Comunn Gàidhealach:
  - Initially An Deo-greine
  - Retitled An Gaidheal (The Gael)
  - Retitled Sruth
- Mac-Talla (Echo - Canada)
- Guth na Bliadhna
- An Gàidheal Ùr (The New Gael, a play on An Gàidheal above, and "New Gael" as in a learner etc.)
- Gairm - the most significant Scottish Gaelic magazine for its sheer longevity and also its range.
- Gath - a successor to Gairm
- Cothrom - a quarterly magazine carrying bi-lingual articles. Aimed primarily at learners. Now in e-format.
- Dàna - the first Gaelic e-zine.
- An Teachdaire Gaidhealach - First published in Australia 1857 and intermittently since.

=== Periodicals with Scottish Gaelic content ===
The following newspapers/magazines carry/carried articles in Scottish Gaelic:

- The Scotsman
- Stornoway Gazette
- Ross-shire Journal
- West Highland Free Press
- Garm-lu
- Tocher (periodical)
- Life and Work, the monthly magazine of the Church of Scotland has a four-page Gaelic supplement.
- The National

=== Periodicals with occasional Scottish Gaelic content ===
The following magazines/newspapers occasionally have/had Scottish Gaelic articles, but are mostly in English/other languages, despite their titles:

- An Ileach (The Islay-person)
- Carn
- Stri
