= Sorley MacLean =

Scottish poet (1911 – 1996)

- Somhairle MacGill-Eain (Note: Gaelic patronymic: Somhairle mac Chaluim 'ic Chaluim 'ic Iain 'ic Tharmaid 'ic Iain 'ic Tharmaid.) (Note: Scottish Gaelic pronunciation: [ˈs̪o.ərlə maxˈkʲiʎɛhɛɲ])
- MacLean at Braes, Skye in 1986
- Born: 26 October 1911; Òsgaig, Raasay, Scotland
- Died: 24 November 1996 (aged 85); Inverness, Scotland
- Resting place: Stronuirinish Cemetery, Portree
- Education: University of Edinburgh
- Occupations: English teacher Head teacher
- Writing career
- Language: Scottish Gaelic
- Years active: 1932–c. 1980
- Genre: Gaelic poetry
- Notable works: Dàin do Eimhir: An Cuilthionn; Hallaig
- Notable awards: Queen's Gold Medal for Poetry: Nominated for Nobel Prize
- Website: www.sorleymaclean.org (Gaelic) www.sorleymaclean.org/english/index.htm (English)

Sorley MacLean (Scottish Gaelic: Somhairle MacGill-Eain; 26 October 1911 – 24 November 1996) was a Scottish Gaelic poet, described by the Scottish Poetry Library as "one of the major Scottish poets of the modern era" because of his "mastery of his chosen medium and his engagement with the European poetic tradition and European politics". Nobel Prize Laureate Seamus Heaney credited MacLean with saving Scottish Gaelic poetry.

He was raised in a strict Presbyterian family on the island of Raasay, immersed in Gaelic culture and literature from birth, but abandoned religion for socialism. In the late 1930s, he befriended many Scottish Renaissance figures, such as Hugh MacDiarmid and Douglas Young. He was wounded three times while serving in the Royal Corps of Signals during the North African Campaign. MacLean published little after the war, due to his perfectionism. In 1956, he became head teacher at Plockton High School, where he advocated for the use of the Gaelic language in formal education.

In his poetry, MacLean juxtaposed traditional Gaelic elements with mainstream European elements, frequently comparing the Highland Clearances with contemporary events, especially the Spanish Civil War. His work was a unique fusion of traditional and modern elements that has been credited with restoring Gaelic tradition to its proper place and reinvigorating and modernizing the Gaelic language. Although his most influential works, Dàin do Eimhir and An Cuilthionn, were published in 1943, MacLean did not become well known until the 1970s, when his works were published in English translation. His later poem Hallaig, published 1954, achieved "cult status" outside Gaelic-speaking circles for its supernatural representation of a village depopulated in the Highland Clearances and came to represent all Scottish Gaelic poetry in the English-speaking imagination.

== Biography ==
=== Early life ===
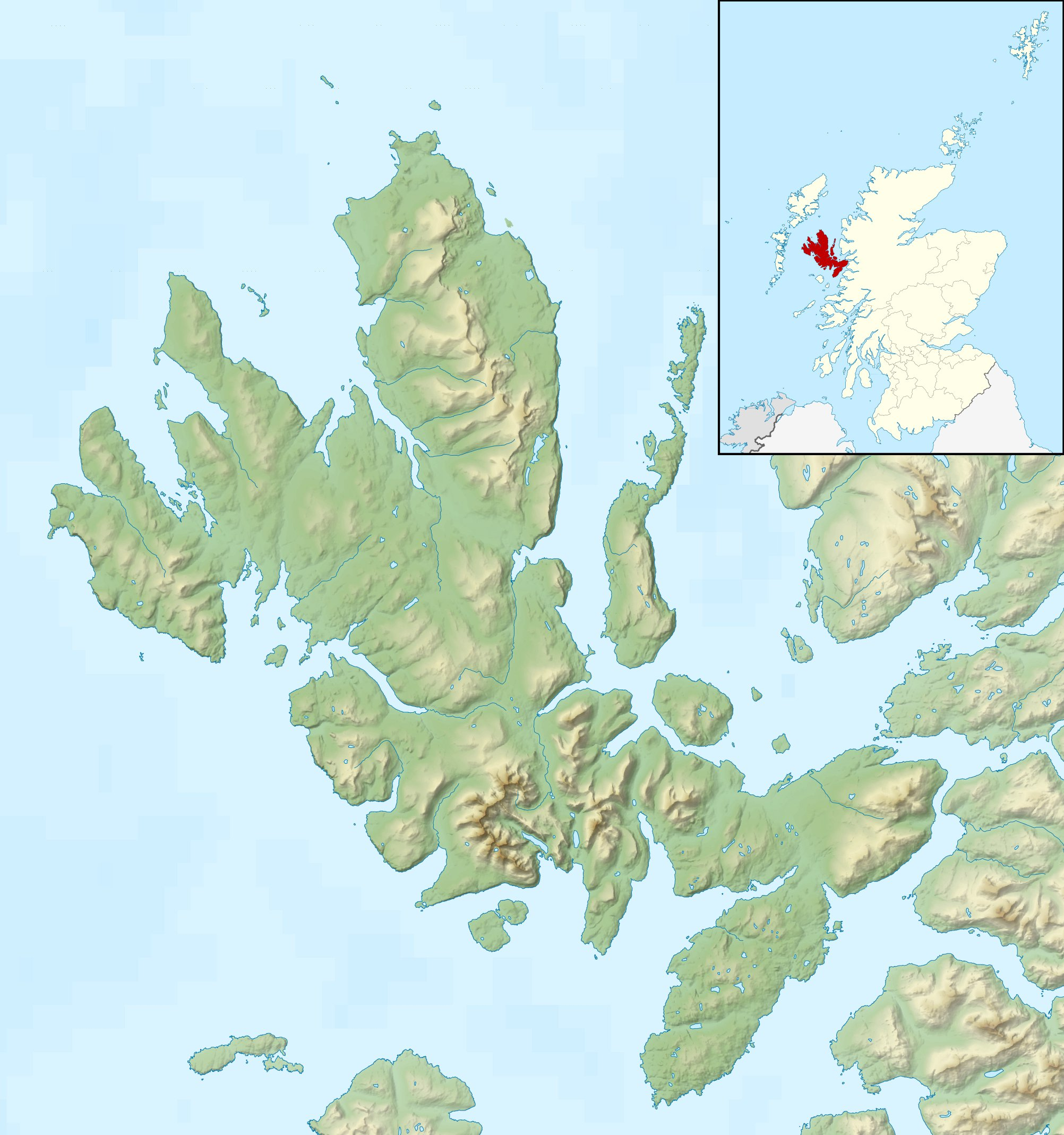
Location of Raasay between Skye and Applecross

Sorley MacLean was born in Òsgaig, Raasay on 26 October 1911; Scottish Gaelic was his first language. Before he went to school at the age of six, he spoke very little English. He was the second of five sons born to Malcolm (1880–1951) and Christina MacLean (1886–1974). The family owned a small croft and ran a tailoring business, but they later gave up the croft to move to a better house, which proved detrimental to their finances when the Great Depression took a high toll on the tailoring business. His brothers were John (1910–1970), a schoolteacher and later rector of Oban High School, who was also a piper; Calum (1915–1960), a noted folklorist and ethnographer; and Alasdair (1918–1999) and Norman (c.1917–c.1980), who became general practitioners. Sorley's two younger sisters, Isobel and Mary, were also schoolteachers. His patronymic was Somhairle mac Chaluim 'ic Chaluim 'ic Iain 'ic Tharmaid 'ic Iain 'ic Tharmaid; he could not trace his genealogy with certainty to the eighth generation.

At home, he was steeped in Gaelic culture and beul-aithris (the oral tradition), especially old songs. His mother, a Nicolson, had been raised near Portree, although her family was of Lochalsh origin; her family had been involved in Highland Land League activism for tenant rights. His father had been raised on Raasay, but his family was originally from North Uist and, before that, probably Mull. Both sides of the family had been evicted during the Highland Clearances, of which many people in the community still had a clear recollection. Both his mother's and father's families contained individuals who were considered accomplished by their communities, whether through formal education or extensive knowledge of the oral tradition.

What MacLean learned of the history of the Gaels, especially of the Clearances, had a significant impact on his worldview and politics. On his mother's side were three noteworthy singers, two pipers, and a village bard.. He said that 'The most intellectual of my relations was a sceptic and Socialist (my uncle in Jordanhill, Alex Nicolson)'. Nicolson had been involved in the ILP and imprisoned as a conscientious objector in WWI and was also a noted historian and Gaelic scholar. Of especial note was MacLean's paternal grandmother, Mary Matheson, whose family had been evicted from Lochalsh in the 18th century. Until her death in 1923, she lived with the family and taught MacLean many traditional songs from Kintail and Lochalsh, as well as Skye. As a child, MacLean enjoyed fishing trips with his aunt Peigi, who taught him other songs. Unlike other members of his family, MacLean could not sing, a fact that he connected with his impetus to write poetry.

=== Calvinism ===
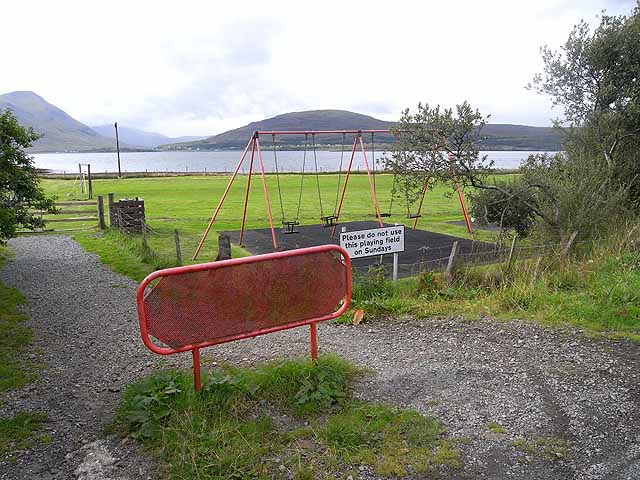
A sign requests that the playground not be used on Sunday.

MacLean was raised in the Free Presbyterian Church of Scotland, which he described as "the strictest of Calvinist fundamentalism". Calvinism taught that God would save a small portion of humanity, the elect, while the vast majority were doomed by the sinfulness inherent in human nature. Only 5% of the congregation took communion; the remainder were considered mere "adherents" who were probably destined for eternal torment in hell. Free Presbyterians believed that the Free Church was too lenient, let alone the Church of Scotland. They prohibited any form of amusement on the Sabbath, but had a rich tradition of unaccompanied psalm singing.

MacLean later said that he had abandoned religion for socialism at the age of twelve, as he refused to accept that a majority of human beings were consigned to eternal damnation. In 1941, he wrote that "perhaps my obsession with the cause of the unhappy, the unsuccessful, the oppressed comes from this." The pessimism of the Calvinist tradition had a strong impact on his world-view, and he also retained "a puritanical contempt for mere worldly riches and power". (Note: As MacLean put it in a letter to Hugh MacDiarmid, "A renegade Seceder makes quite a good Marxist".) Later in life, he had a complicated view of the church and religion. Although he criticized the Presbyterian church's suppression of Gaelic song, Scottish traditional music, and the oral tradition, as well as the negative effect of church teachings on some social groups, especially women, Professor Donald Meek (gd) wrote that at times MacLean seemed to articulate the ideas of liberation theology. John MacInnes has argued that his evangelical Presbyterian background was an important influence on his choice of Gaelic as the medium for his poetry and the manner of its expression. MacLean defended the Free Presbyterian Church against opponents who had little familiarity with it, once describing Free Presbyterian Church elders as "saintly, just saintly men". Sometimes he altered his poetry to avoid offending the religious members of his family. He also admired the linguistic and literary sophistication and creativity of Protestant sermons in Gaelic. The wide vocabulary, high register, and passion of these sermons had a significant impact on his poetic style.

=== 1930s ===
He was educated at Raasay Primary School and Portree Secondary School. In 1929, he left home to attend the University of Edinburgh. For economic reasons, he chose to study English literature instead of Celtic studies, a decision he later regretted "because I was interested only in poetry and only in some poetry at that." He intensely disliked the head of the English department, Herbert Grierson, who favoured different poets than MacLean; MacLean also felt that Grierson imposed his aesthetic preferences on the department. MacLean's academic work has been described as merely "dutiful". While at Edinburgh, MacLean also took classes in the Celtic Department, then under William J. Watson. He was involved in literary circles, played for the university shinty team, and, like many other British intellectuals of the same era, was Pro-Soviet and, while never an official member, he was involved as a "fellow traveller" with the Communist Party of Great Britain. MacLean later described an occasion in which he joined a demonstration against Sir Oswald Mosley, the leader of the British Union of Fascists. According to Celtic scholar Emma Dymock, MacLean's education at Edinburgh broadened his horizons and the city itself was significant in his life. While in Edinburgh, he also observed urban poverty, slums, and overcrowding, which was especially severe due to the continuing Great Depression. After his graduation in 1933 with a first-class degree, he remained in Edinburgh and studied at Moray House Teachers' Training College. While there, he was introduced to Hugh MacDiarmid in Rutherford's Bar on Drummond Street by George Elder Davie. He later translated seven Gaelic poems into English for MacDiarmid's Golden Treasury of Scottish Poetry (1940).

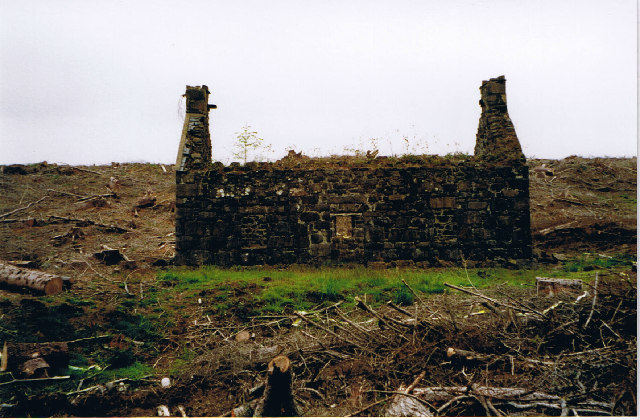
Ruins of a stone house on Mull

In 1934, he returned to Skye to teach English at Portree High School. He visited MacDiarmid on Whalsay in Shetland during the summer holiday in late July and early August 1935. After the Spanish Civil War broke out in 1936, he considered volunteering to fight in the International Brigades; according to his daughter, he would have gone if not for the poverty of his family and his own responsibilities as their provider. At the time, his mother was seriously ill and his father's business was failing. In January 1938, MacLean accepted a teaching position at Tobermory High School on the Isle of Mull, where he stayed until December. The year he spent on Mull had a profound effect on him, because Mull was still devastated from nineteenth-century Highland Clearances, during which MacLean's own ancestors had been evicted. MacLean later said, "I believe Mull had much to do with my poetry: its physical beauty, so different from Skye's, with the terrible imprint of the clearances on it, made it almost intolerable for a Gael." He believed that fascism was likely to emerge victorious in Europe, and was further dismayed by the continuing decline of the Gaelic language.

Between 1939 and 1941, he taught at Boroughmuir High School in Edinburgh, and in Hawick. During this period, he wrote most of the poetry that would become Dàin do Eimhir, including the epic An Cuilthionn. MacLean cultivated friendships with Scottish Renaissance poets, including MacDiarmid, Robert Garioch, Norman MacCaig, Douglas Young, and George Campbell Hay. MacLean, also a noted historian, published two influential papers on nineteenth-century Gaelic poetry in Transactions of the Gaelic Society of Inverness in 1938 and 1939, which challenged the Celtic Twilight view of Scottish Gaelic literature. MacLean accused the "Celtic Twilightists" of "attributing to Gaelic poetry the very opposite of every quality which it actually has", and stated that their claims only succeeded because the Twilightists catered solely to an English-speaking audience. He pointed out that the apparent sentimentality and sense of impotence within surviving poetry about the Highland Clearances may well have been due to the fact that Anglo-Scottish landlords would not have tolerated poetry that was openly critical of them. His use of Gaelic poetry as a potential source material for historical studies was also radically innovative at the time.

=== World War II ===
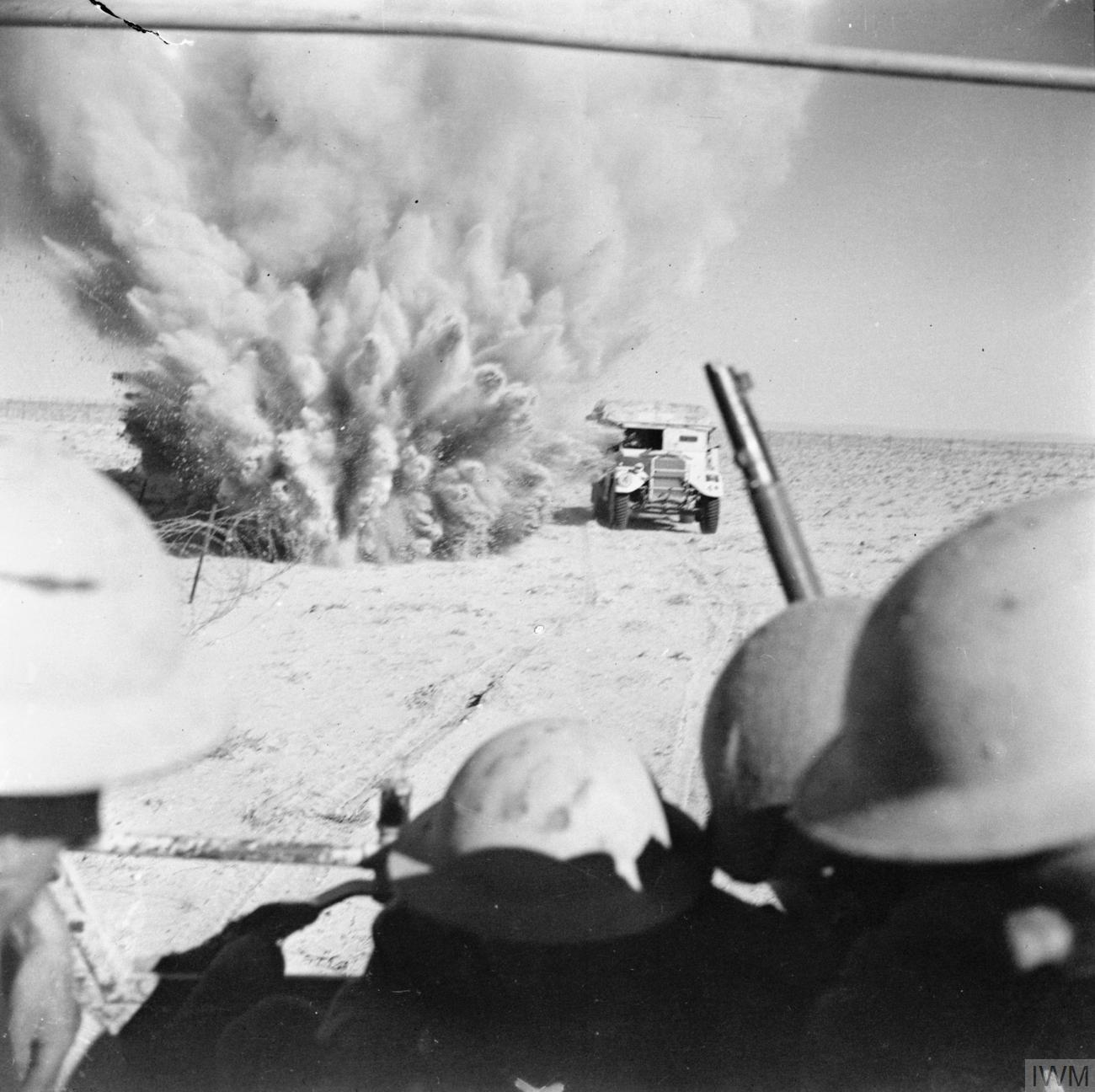
A mine explodes during the Second Battle of El Alamein

Upon the outbreak of war in 1939, MacLean wanted to volunteer for the Cameron Highlanders but was prevented due to the shortage of teachers. He was drafted into the Royal Corps of Signals in September 1940 and was sent overseas to North Africa in December 1941. In the North African Campaign, he served in the Royal Horse Artillery and was wounded on three occasions, but on the first two not severely enough to be classified as a casualty. His military career ended in November 1942 during the Second Battle of El Alamein. A land mine exploded near the command post where MacLean was working, throwing him thirty feet (nine metres) through the air. He was wounded in the leg and broke several bones in his feet. (Note: In one of his poems, Latha Fogair ("An Autumn Day"), MacLean satirizes the Calvinist doctrine of unconditional election by describing an explosion of a mine which killed six of his comrades but, for no particular reason, spared MacLean.) MacLean wrote a few poems about the war in which he challenged the traditional Gaelic exaltation of heroism, exemplified by the lament for Alasdair of Glengarry; he viewed physical courage as morally neutral, since it was also valued by Nazis and used for evil ends.

MacLean returned to Britain for convalescence in March 1943. He was discharged from Raigmore Hospital in Inverness in August 1943 and released from the army in September. In the fall of 1943, he resumed teaching at Boroughmuir, where he met Renee Cameron in 1944. (Note: Cameron's mother was not of Gaelic ancestry, but her father, an Inverness joiner, was raised in Kilmuir on the Black Isle when it was still Gaelic-speaking.) They married on 24 July 1946 in Inverness and had three daughters and six grandchildren. According to friends, their marriage was happy and peaceful, as they complemented each other well, and MacLean "mellowed" with age and family life. He had never been a card carrying member of the Communist Party of Great Britain, and the Soviet occupation of Poland after the war caused MacLean to break with his former admiration for the Soviet Union and Stalinism. As a member of the Anti-Stalinist left, however, MacLean always remained a strong believer in social justice. During this period, he frequently reviewed poetry and continued to make friends in literary circles, including the younger poets Iain Crichton Smith and George Mackay Brown. He became particularly close to Sydney Goodsir Smith, who shared a flat with MacLean and his family for more than a year. In 1947 he was promoted to Principal Teacher of English at Boroughmuir, but MacLean wanted to return to the western Highlands.

=== Later life ===
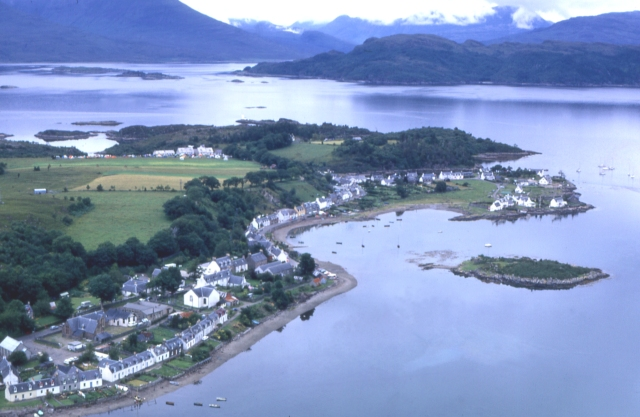
Aerial view of Plockton in 1971

In 1956, MacLean was offered the position of head teacher of Plockton High School in Wester Ross, not far from where his paternal grandmother's family had lived. It was a difficult assignment as the remote location was not attractive to teacher candidates, and MacLean frequently had to teach due to vacancies. While at Plockton, he promoted the use of Scottish Gaelic medium education and campaigned for a Highers exam for learners of Gaelic. Before 1968, there was no separate exam for Gaelic learners, who had to compete with native speakers if they took Gaelic Highers. MacLean felt that this unfair policy discouraged many students from studying Gaelic, although he encouraged his students to take the exam even if they were not native speakers. (Note: According to MacLean, the number of students studying Gaelic "doubled, trebled, quadrupled, and more" as a result of the learners' exam becoming available.) In 1966, he presented a paper to the Gaelic Society of Inverness outlining the practical issues in Gaelic education. MacLean pointed out that in continental Europe, it was not uncommon to study three or four languages in school. According to MacLean, Scottish children would benefit from studying three languages in school alongside English, and "surely it is not expecting too much of Gaelic patriotism to demand that Gaelic should be one of the three?" (Note: Fully Gaelic medium education, with all subjects taught in Gaelic, was inaugurated in 1985.) MacLean set high academic expectations for his students and also promoted shinty; in 1965, the Plockton team won the cup for Ross and Cromarty.

MacLean's many friends and visitors commented on his prodigious knowledge and deep interest in genealogy and local history. He continued to participate in politics, eventually joining the Scottish Labour Party. During his later years, he published few poems due to his "concern with quality and authenticity over quantity"; his family responsibilities and career left him little spare time to write. MacLean said that he had burned his poetry instead of publishing it because of his "long years of grinding school-teaching and [his] addiction to an impossible lyric ideal".

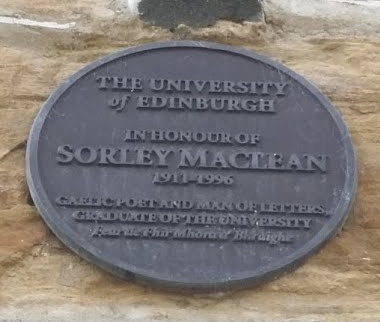
A plaque in honour of Sorley Maclean in Edinburg

After his retirement in 1972, MacLean moved to his great-grandmother's house at Peinnachorrain in Braes on Skye, with views over the Sound of Raasay, where he raised roses and entertained frequently. Following the English publication of his poetry, he began to be in demand internationally for poetry readings, for which he traveled to such places as Rotterdam, Baddeck Cape Breton, and Berlin. MacLean was writer in residence at the University of Edinburgh from 1973 to 1975, where he reportedly kept an open door and warm welcome for aspiring Gaelic poets. Later, he was the second filidh at the recently founded Sabhal Mòr Ostaig, a Gaelic-medium university on Skye, from 1975 to 1976. He was involved in founding the institution and also served on its board. In 1993, his daughter Catrìona died at the age of 41; MacLean and his wife helped to raise her three children. The poet died of natural causes on 24 November 1996, aged 85, at Raigmore Hospital in Inverness.

== Poetry ==
=== Influences ===
Before he went to university, MacLean was writing in both English and Gaelic. (Note: He later described his English poetry as "mostly imitative of Eliot and Pound... over-sophisticated, over-self-conscious".) After writing a Gaelic poem, A' Chorra-ghritheach ("The Heron"), in 1932, he decided to write only in Gaelic and burned his earlier poems. MacLean later said, "I was not one who could write poetry if it did not come to me in spite of myself, and if it came, it had to come in Gaelic". However, it is also clear from his correspondence with MacDiarmid that his choice was also motivated by his determination to preserve and develop the Gaelic language. The Gaelic language had been in decline for several centuries; the 1931 census registered 136,135 Gaelic speakers in Scotland, only 3% of the Scottish population. Despite his decision to write in the language, at times MacLean doubted that Gaelic would survive and his poetry would be appreciated. (Note: In 1943, he wrote in a letter to Hugh MacDiarmid: "The whole prospect of Gaelic appals me, the more I think of the difficulties and the likelihood of its extinction in a generation or two. A ... language with ... no modern prose of any account, no philosophical or technical vocabulary to speak of, no correct usage except among old people and a few university students, colloquially full of gross English idiom lately taken over... (what chance of the appreciation of the overtones of poetry, except amongst a handful?)")

For 1,500 years, Scottish Gaelic literature had developed a rich corpus of song and poetry across "literary, sub-literary, and non-literate" registers; it retained the ability to convey "an astonishingly wide range of human experience". MacLean's work drew on this "inherited wealth of immemorial generations"; according to MacInnes, few people were as intimately familiar with the entire corpus of Gaelic poetry, written and oral, as MacLean. In particular, MacLean was inspired by the intense love poetry of William Ross, written in the eighteenth century. Of all poetry, MacLean held in highest regard the Scottish Gaelic songs composed before the nineteenth century by anonymous, illiterate poets and passed down via the oral tradition. He once said that Scottish Gaelic song-poetry was "the chief artistic glory of the Scots, and of all people of Celtic speech, and one of the greatest artistic glories of Europe".

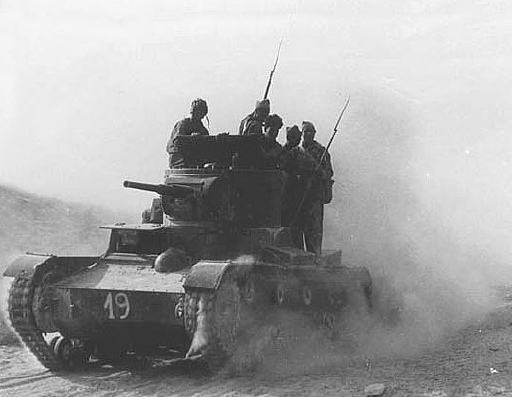
Members of the XI International Brigade at the Battle of Belchite

MacLean once said that various Communist figures meant more to him than any poet, writing to Douglas Young in 1941 that "Lenin, Stalin and Dimitroff now mean more to me than Prometheus and Shelley did in my teens". Other left-wing figures that inspired MacLean included James Connolly, an Irish trade union leader executed for leading the Easter Rising; John Maclean, Scottish socialist and pacifist; and John Cornford, Julian Bell, and Federico García Lorca, who were killed by the Francoist regime during the Spanish Civil War. Many of these figures were not Gaels, and some critics have noted MacLean's unusual generosity to non-Gaelic people in his work. Perhaps the one uniting theme in his work is MacLean's anti-elitism and focus on social justice.

Nevertheless, MacLean read widely and was influenced by poets from a variety of styles and eras. Of contemporary poets, Hugh MacDiarmid, Ezra Pound, and William Butler Yeats had the greatest impact. After reading A Drunk Man Looks at the Thistle by MacDiarmid, MacLean decided to try his hand at extended narrative poetry, resulting in the unfinished An Cuilthionn. He was also influenced by the Metaphysical school. However, he disdained the popular left-wing poets of the 1930s, such as W. H. Auden or Stephen Spender, and sometimes regarded poetry as a useless aesthetic hobby.

=== Dàin do Eimhir ===
In 1940, eight of MacLean's poems were printed in 17 Poems for 6d, along with Scots poems by Robert Garioch. The pamphlet sold better than expected and was reprinted a few weeks later; it received favourable reviews. While MacLean was in North Africa, he left his poetry with Douglas Young, who had promised to help publish it. In November 1943, the poems were published as Dàin do Eimhir agus Dàin Eile (English: Poems to Eimhir and Other Poems). (Note: Dàin do Eimhir was published primarily in Gaelic, but included MacLean's prose translations of some poems in a smaller font.) Dàin do Eimhir was a sequence of sixty numbered poems, with twelve missing; (Note: Some poems were omitted because MacLean doubted their quality; others were left out due to their personal content. He asked Young to destroy the unpublished poems, but Young refused. All but one poem survived to be published in Christopher Whyte's critical edition in 2002.) of the other poems, the most significant was the long narrative poem An Cuilthionn. (Note: An Cuilthionn was written between 1939 and 1940, never finished, but published anyway.) The book marked a sharp break in style and substance of Gaelic poetry from earlier eras. In his poetry, MacLean emphasized the struggle between love and duty, which was personified in the poet's difficulty in choosing between his infatuation with a female figure, Eimhir, and what he sees as his moral obligation to volunteer in the Spanish Civil War.

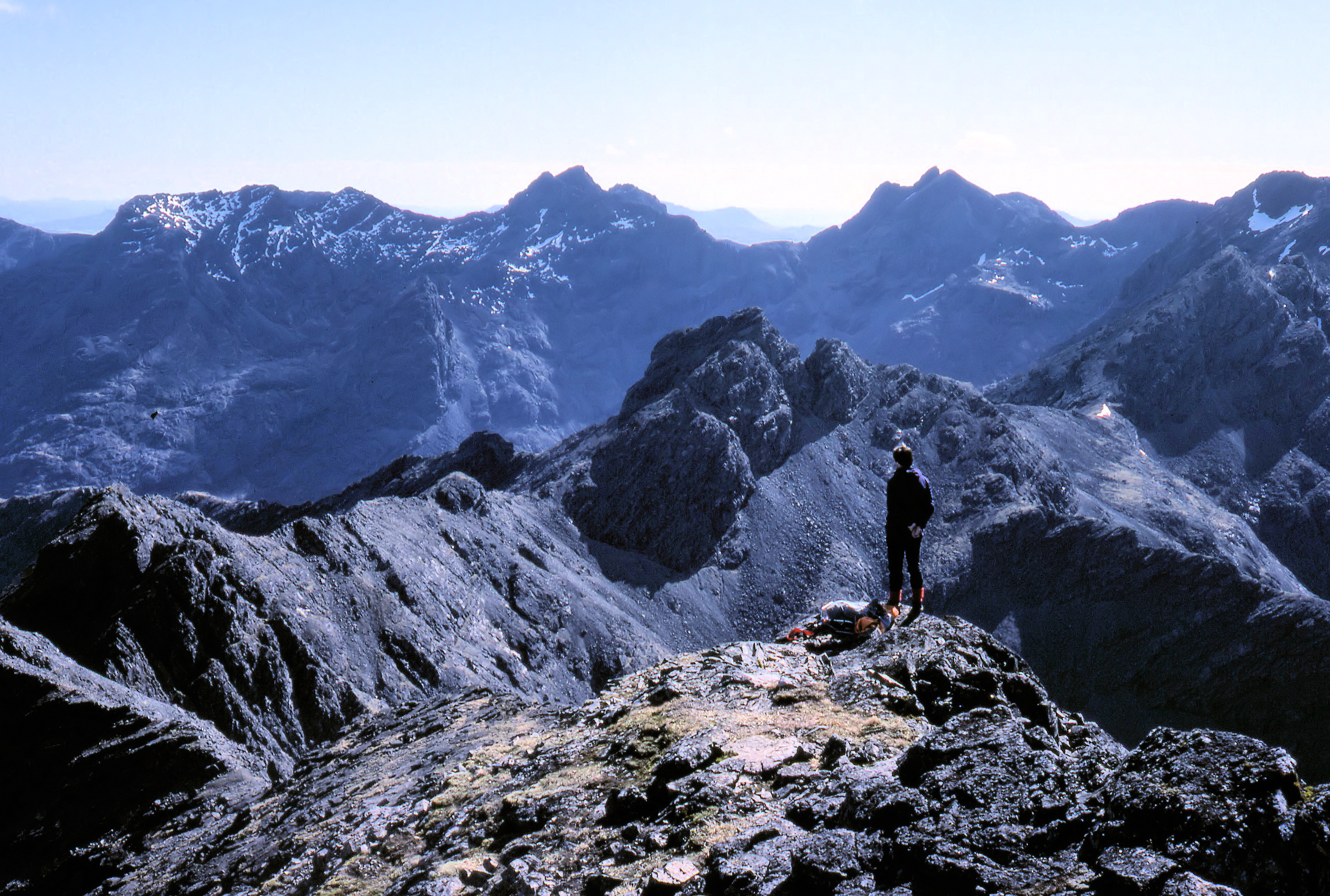
The Cuillin inspired MacLean's poetry

The book has been the subject of scholarly debate. Attempting to explain why MacLean's earlier poetry has had the greatest influence, Derick Thomson wrote that it is love poetry which is most timeless, while MacLean's political poetry has not aged as well. (Note: Ronald Black disagreed with this analysis, citing a student of his who chose MacLean's little-known poem A' Ghort Mhòr (English: The Great Famine) for a class presentation. Asked why, she replied, "it is relevant to today, rather than all that stuff about love".) According to Maoilios Caimbeul, "There is not, and I doubt there will ever be, a series of love poems" that would have as much influence on Gaelic literature. (Note: "Chan eil, agus tha teagamh agam nach bi, sreath de dhàin ghaoil ann an litreachas na Gàidhlig a thig an uisge-stiùrach nan dàn seo.") Ronald Black suggested that "duty [is not]... a comprehensible emotion nowadays" and therefore "the greatest universal in MacLean's verse is the depiction of that extraordinary psychosis which is called being in love". However, this type of commentary has been criticized as an attempt to depoliticize MacLean's work. Seamus Heaney argued that Eimhir was similar to Beatrice in Dante's Divine Comedy, in that Eimhir "resolves at a symbolic level tensions which would otherwise be uncontainable or wasteful". Scottish poet Iain Crichton Smith said, "there is a sense in which the Spanish Civil War does not form the background to these poems, but is the protagonist".

MacLean's work was innovative and influential because it juxtaposed elements from Gaelic history and tradition with icons from mainstream European history. He described his poetry as "radiating from Skye and the West Highlands to the whole of Europe". By this juxtaposition, he implicitly asserted the value of the Gaelic tradition and the right of Gaels to participate as equals in the broader cultural landscape. According to John MacInnes, MacLean put the much-denigrated Gaelic language and tradition in its proper place, which has a profound effect on Gaelic-speaking readers and is fundamental to their reading of his poetry. An Cuilthionn, the mountains of Skye are used as a synecdoche for rifts in European politics, and the suffering of the Gaels due to the Highland Clearances is compared to the suffering of European people under Francoism and other fascist regimes. MacLean frequently compared the injustice of the Highland Clearances with modern-day issues; in his opinion, the greed of the wealthy and powerful was responsible for many tragedies and social problems.

The book won him recognition as "the major force in modern Gaelic poetry", according to The Cambridge Companion to British Poetry. Caimbeul writes that the poems "capture the uncertainty, pain, yearning, and the search for stability that are at the heart of Modernism". (Note: "Tha e a' ciallachadh gu bheil na Dàin seo a' glacadh a' mhì-chinnt, am pian, an sireadh, an t-iarraidh airson nì seasmhach a tha aig cridhe Nuadhachais".) Summarizing the impact of the book, Professor Donald MacAulay wrote, "After the publication of this book Gaelic poetry could never be the same again."

=== Recognition ===
How many people know that the best living Scottish poet, by a whole head and shoulders, after the two major figures in this century, Edwin Muir and Hugh MacDiarmid, is not any of the English writing poets, but Sorley MacLean? Yet he alone takes his place easily and indubitably beside these two major poets: and he writes only in Gaelic [...] That Sorley MacLean is a great poet in the Gaelic tradition, a man not merely for time, but for eternity, I have no doubt whatever.

— Tom Scott, 1970

Although his poetry had a profound impact on the Gaelic-speaking world, it was not until the 1970s and 1980s that MacLean's work became accessible in English translation. His poetry was not very accessible to Gaelic speakers either, since Dàin do Eimhir was not reprinted. To English-speakers, MacLean remained virtually unknown until 1970, when issue 34 of Lines Review was dedicated to his work and some of his poems were reproduced in the anthology Four Points of the Saltire. In the preface to the collection, Tom Scott forcefully argued for the merit of MacLean's poetry. Iain Crichton Smith published an English translation of Dàin do Eimhir in 1971. (Note: This edition only contained 36 of the poems in the Eimhir sequence, and did not reproduce the Gaelic originals.) MacLean was part of the delegation that represented Scotland at the first Cambridge Poetry Festival in 1975, establishing his reputation in England. He was one of five Gaelic poets to be anthologized in the influential 1976 collection Nua-Bhàrdachd Ghàidhlig / Modern Scottish Gaelic Poems with verse translations by the authors. MacLean's verse translations were also included in later publications.

In 1977, Canongate Books published Reothairt is Contraigh: Taghadh de Dhàin 1932–72 (English: Spring tide and Neap tide: Selected Poems 1932–72). MacLean changed the ordering of the Dàin do Eimhir sequence, altering many poems and omitting others. In the original version of An Cuilthionn, MacLean had asked the Red Army to invade Scotland. (Note: "Có bheir faochadh dhan àmhghar mur tig an t-Arm Dearg sa chàs seo?" (Who will give respite to the agony unless the Red Army comes in this extremity?)) This passage was expunged, among other alterations and omissions that led the Scottish Poetry Library to describe the 1977 version as having been "bowdlerized". MacLean said that he would only consent to publishing the parts of his older work that he found "tolerable". The critical acclaim and fame that MacLean achieved was almost entirely from critics who did not understand his poetry in the original Gaelic. In 1989, a further compilation of his poetry, O Choille gu Bearradh / From Wood to Ridge: Collected Poems in Gaelic and English won him lasting critical acclaim. Complete annotated editions of his work have since been published.

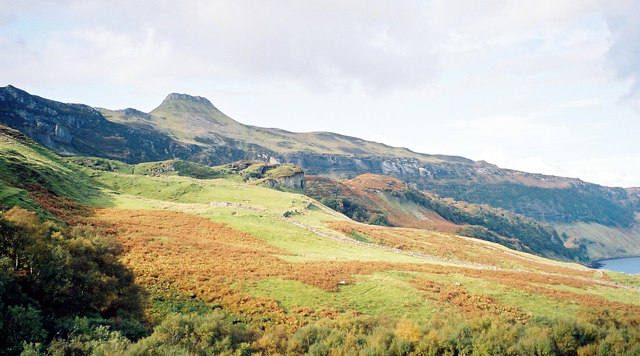
Hallaig, Raasay, made famous by MacLean's 1954 poem

From the early 1970s, MacLean was in demand internationally as a reader of his own poetry. He would start a reading of a poem by describing the images, then read the poem first in Gaelic and again in English, emphasizing that the translations were not to be read as poems in themselves. His readings were described as deeply moving even by listeners who did not speak Gaelic; according to Seamus Heaney, "MacLean's voice had a certain bardic weirdness that sounded both stricken and enraptured". Gaelic poet George Campbell Hay wrote in a review that MacLean "is gifted with what the Welsh call Hwyl, the power of elevated declamation, and his declamation is full of feeling." These readings helped establish his international reputation as a poet. MacLean's poetry was also translated into German, and he was invited to poetry readings in Germany and Austria.

In the English-speaking world, MacLean's best-known poem is Hallaig, a meditation on a Raasay village which had been cleared of its inhabitants. Raasay was cleared between 1852 and 1854 under George Rainy; most of its inhabitants were forced to emigrate. Many of MacLean's relatives were affected, and Hallaig was one of the villages to be depopulated. The poem was written a century later, during MacLean's time in Edinburgh, and originally published in 1954 in the Gaelic-language magazine Gairm. Beginning with the famous line, "Time, the deer, is in the wood of Hallaig", (Note: Scottish Gaelic: Tha tìm, am fiadh, an coille Hallaig) the poem imagines the village as it was before the Clearances, with the long-dead eternally walking through the trees. It is also filled with local names of individuals and places, which have deeper meanings to those intimately familiar with Raasay oral tradition. Unlike most of MacLean's output, Hallaig has no overt political references, and never directly mentions eviction or clearance. For this reason, it was seen as politically "safer" than others of MacLean's poems. Translated and promoted by Irish Nobel Prize Laureate Seamus Heaney, Hallaig achieved "cult status" and came to symbolize Scottish Gaelic poetry in the English-speaking imagination.

=== Style ===
MacLean's poetry generally followed an older style of metre, based on the more dynamic patterns of the oral tradition rather than the strict, static metres of the written Gaelic poetry of the nineteenth century. He frequently combined metrical patters and shifted in the middle of a poem, achieving "sensuous effects" that cannot be translated. He typically used the traditional vowel rhymes, both internal and end-rhymes, that are ubiquitous in the oral tradition, but a few of his poems have less traditional rhyme schemes. However, he was flexible in his use of metre, "[combining] old and new in such a way that neither neutralizes each other," (Note: Caimbeul writes, "ceòlmhor ann an dòigh a tha sean agus ùr", meaning, roughly, "musical in both old and new ways".) extending rather than repudiating tradition, in a way that is unique in Gaelic poetry. In MacInnes' analysis, "rhythmic patterns become a vital part of the meaning" of MacLean's poetry. Over time, his poems became less strict in their application of rhyme and metre. According to MacInnes, labels such as "classical" and "romantic", which have been applied respectively to the form and content of MacLean's poetry, are misleading because MacLean did not limit himself by those styles. Despite MacLean's reliance on the oral tradition, his poetry was not intended to be sung. Although he abandoned the "verbal codes" and intricate symbolism of the Gaelic tradition, MacLean occasionally used outmoded devices, such as the repeating of adjectives.

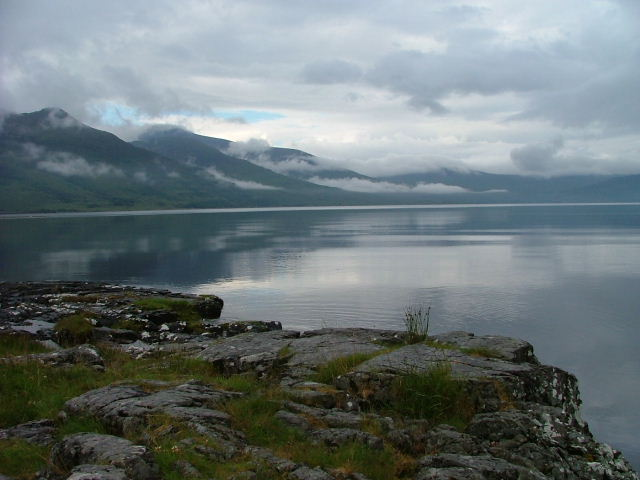
The sea is a recurring theme in Gaelic poetry

MacLean's poetry frequently used Gaelic themes and references, such as place names, trees, and sea symbolism. A knowledge of that tradition would bring additional interpretations and appreciation to a reading of MacLean's poetry. Another important symbol in his work is the face, which represents romantic love.

According to John MacInnes, MacLean's poetry "exhibits virtually an entire spectrum of language". Some of his poetry is transparent to a fluent Gaelic speaker, but the meaning of other poems needs to be untangled. MacLean coined very few neologisms; (Note: MacInnes said that he could not find a single neologism in all of MacLean's poetry.) however, he revived or repurposed many obscure or archaic words. MacLean often said that he had heard these old words in Presbyterian sermons. According to MacInnes and Maoilios Caimbeul, MacLean's revival of these old, forgotten Gaelic words revolutionized literary Gaelic, by adding senses and a newness and modernity. Caimbeul wrote that MacLean's vocabulary is not "simple", but it is "natural" and arises naturally from everyday speech, although mixed with other influences.

In contrast, the English translations were all written in a very straightforward style, flattening the language by the necessity to choose one English word for the ambiguity and connotations of the Gaelic one. According to Christopher Whyte, the English translations produce "an official interpretation, one that restricts and deadens the range of possible readings of the poem". English could not convey the pop that MacLean's revival of disused words brought to his Gaelic poetry. While the Gaelic poems were noted for their acoustic properties, the translations did not pay any particular attention to sound, instead focusing narrowly on literal meaning. MacLean emphasized that his "line-by-line translations" were not poetry; of the prose translation of An Cuilthionn that appeared in Dàin do Eimhir, he wrote, "my English version has not even the merit of very strict literal accuracy as I find more and more when I look over it". Seamus Heaney called the translations "cribs".

== Awards and honours ==
In June 1987, MacLean became the first freeman of Skye and Lochalsh. He received seven honorary degrees. (Note: L.L.D., University of Dundee 1972; D.Litt., Celt, the National University of Ireland 1979; D.Litt., University of Edinburgh 1980; D.Univ., Open University 1989; D.Univ., University of Grenoble 1989; D.Phil., Anglia Polytechnic 1994; D.Litt., University of Glasgow 1996) Twice, he was the honorary head of the Gaelic Society of Inverness, in 1970 and 1982; he was made honorary president of the Saltire Society in 1985. In 1989, he became a Fellow of the Royal Society of Literature. The next year, he was named the first University of Edinburgh Alumnus of the Year, and awarded a Queen's Gold Medal for Poetry. O Choille gu Bearradh was the Saltire Society Scottish Book of the Year for 1990, and MacLean won the McVitie's Prize for Scottish Writer of the Year. He became a Fellow of the Educational Institute of Scotland in 1991, a Fellow of the Royal Society of Edinburgh in 1992, an honorary fellow of the Royal Incorporation of Architects in Scotland in 1996, and an honorary Royal Scottish Academician the same year. He was nominated for the Nobel Prize in Literature in 1992; it has been suggested that he might have won if he had not written in such a marginalized language. MacLean is commemorated by a stone in Makars' Court, outside the Writers' Museum, Lawnmarket, Edinburgh, unveiled in 1998 by Iain Crichton Smith.

== Legacy ==
Hugh MacDiarmid wrote a letter to MacLean in 1977, a year before his death, stating that he and MacLean were the best Scottish poets of the twentieth century. MacDiarmid and MacLean influenced each other's work and maintained an extensive correspondence which has been published. Douglas Young wrote that "the best poetry written in our generation in the British Isles has been in Scottish Gaelic, by Sorley MacLean." John MacInnes called him a "magisterial writer" who "[pushed] Gaelic to its limits". He said that it is "truly astonishing" that Gaelic, so long minoritized, could have produced a writer like MacLean, who could not express what he had to say in any other language: "Somhairle MacGill-Eain needed Gaelic, and Gaelic needed Somhairle MacGill-Eain". According to Iain Crichton Smith, translator of MacLean's poetry, Dàin do Eimhir was "the greatest Gaelic book of this century", an assessment with which Christopher Whyte agreed. According to Maoilios Caimbeul, MacLean was the best Scottish Gaelic poet of all time. Smith compared the calibre of MacLean's love poetry to that of Catallus and William Butler Yeats. Nobel Prize Laureate Seamus Heaney said that MacLean had "saved Gaelic poetry... for all time".

While acknowledging the literary merit of MacLean's work, Whyte suggested that it was unfortunate that in the 1980s it stood in for all Scottish Gaelic poetry in the Anglophone world. According to Whyte, MacLean's poetry is "comparatively unGaelic, elitist rather than populist, and permeable only with difficulty to the community which uses the language in its day to day existence". MacInnes concedes that MacLean does not cater to his readers; however, in his opinion it would be incorrect to call the poetry elitist because of its "artistic sincerity", speaking "with affective directness and a simple passionate intensity". Compounding the difficulty is that the traditional medium of Gaelic poetry is song, and many fluent speakers do not have strong reading skills. In an effort to make MacLean's work more accessible to Scottish Gaelic speakers, the Sorley MacLean Trust commissioned several musicians (Note: Stuart MacRae, Mary Ann Kennedy, Eilidh Mackenzie, Marie-Louise Napier, Allan Macdonald, Blair Douglas, Allan Henderson, Donald Shaw, and Kenneth Thomson) to set some of MacLean's poems to music.

MacLean once gave a poetry reading at a Runrig concert.

In the Gaelic-speaking world, MacLean's influence has been pervasive and persistent. Poet Aonghas MacNeacail started writing in English, because "My education gave me to believe that Gaelic literature was dead"; he credited MacLean with convincing him otherwise and inspiring him to write in Gaelic. The Gaelic rock band Runrig once invited MacLean to come onstage for a poetry reading. However, MacLean had less impact on rural Gaelic-speaking communities. Novelist Angus Peter Campbell wrote that he preferred the work of local Uist bards to MacLean, and he believed that other Uist people felt the same. Australian poet Les Murray acknowledged MacLean's influence on his work.

A film, Hallaig, was made in 1984 by Timothy Neat, including a discussion by MacLean of the dominant influences on his poetry, with commentary by Smith and Heaney, and substantial passages from the poem and other work, along with extracts of Gaelic song. The poem also forms part of the lyrics of Peter Maxwell Davies' opera The Jacobite Rising; and MacLean's own reading of it in English and in Gaelic was sampled by Martyn Bennett in his album Bothy Culture for a track of the same name.

A controversy erupted in 2000, when John MacLeod, chief of Clan MacLeod, put the Black Cuillin mountain range of Skye on the market in order to finance the repair of Dunvegan Castle. His real estate agency, Savills, used excerpts from An Cuilthionn to advertise the property. Many people found this to be an inappropriate use of MacLean's work. Savills apologized unreservedly, which was accepted by Renee MacLean.

== Selected works ==
Poetry collections

- MacLean, Sorley; Garioch, Robert (1940). 17 Songs for 6d (in Scottish Gaelic and Scots). Edinburgh: Chalmers Press.
- MacGhill-Eathain, Somhairle (1943). Dàin do Eimhir agus Dàin Eile (in Scottish Gaelic). Glasgow: William Maclellan. OCLC 1040951021.
- MacLean, Sorley; Hay, George Campbell; Neill, William; MacGregor, Stuart (1970). Four Points of a Saltire (in English, Scots, and Scottish Gaelic). Edinburgh: Reprographia. OCLC 654353907.
- MacLean, Sorley (1971). Smith, Iain Crichton (ed.). Poems to Eimhir. London: Gollancz. ISBN 978-0-575-00746-8.
- MacLean, Sorley; Hay, George Campbell; Smith, Iain Crichton; Thomson, Derick; MacAulay, Donald (1976). MacAulay, Donald (ed.). Modern Scottish Gaelic Poems: Nua-Bhàrdachd Ghàidhlig (in English and Scottish Gaelic). Edinburgh: Southside. ISBN 978-0-8112-0631-0.
- MacLean, Sorley (1977). Reothairt is Conntràigh / Spring Tide and Neap Tide, 1932-72 (in English and Scottish Gaelic). Edinburgh: Canongate Books. ISBN 978-0-903937-15-3.
- MacLean, Sorley (1989). O Choille gu Bearradh: Collected Poems in Gaelic and English (in English and Scottish Gaelic). Manchester: Carcanet. ISBN 978-0-85635-844-9.
- MacGill-Eain, Somhairle (2002). Whyte, Christopher (ed.). Dàin do Eimhir / Poems to Eimhir (in English and Scottish Gaelic). Glasgow: Association for Scottish Literary Studies. ISBN 978-0-948877-50-6.
- MacGill-Eain, Somhairle (2011). Whyte, Christopher (ed.). An Cuilithionn 1939: The Cuillin 1939 and Unpublished Poems (in English and Scottish Gaelic). Glasgow: Association for Scottish Literary Studies. ISBN 978-1-906841-03-4.
- MacLean, Sorley (2011). Whyte, Christopher; Dymock, Emma (eds.). Caoir Gheal Leumraich / White Leaping Flame: Collected Poems in Gaelic with English Translations (in English and Scottish Gaelic). Edinburgh: Polygon. ISBN 978-1-84697-190-7.

Literary criticism

- MacGill-Eain, Somhairle (1985). Gillies, William (ed.). Ris a' Bhruthaich: Criticism and Prose Writings. Stornoway: Acair. ISBN 978-0-86152-041-1.
