= Gairm =

Scottish Gaelic magazine

Gairm was a Scottish Gaelic quarterly magazine founded in 1951 by Derick Thomson, and Finlay J. MacDonald (Scottish Gaelic: Fionnlagh Domhnallach). Its first issue was published in Autumn 1952. MacDonald served as an editor until 1964; Thomson remained present for decades until the magazine ceased publication in 2004, producing just over 200 issues in total.

According to Alan Campbell, the magazine was a "one-man show;" he explained that Thomson "sustained something very valuable for a long period of time." Although it had a relatively low circulation, it was influential on Gaelic literature as it was the longest-running Gaelic literary magazine of the 20th century, in circulation for more than twice as long as its predecessor, Guth na Bliadhna. Gairm attempted to encompass a variety of perspectives and themes, and "disseminated a lot of work that we weren't aware of" in the words of Martin MacDonald.

The extent to which Gairm was familiar to the wider literate Scottish Gaelic population is unknown, as information about literacy in the language only became available from 1971. Roger Hutchinson stresses the magazine's influence, attracting influential writers including Sorley MacLean, Iain Crichton Smith, George Campbell Hay, and Dòmhnall MacAmhlaigh.

Some of the most influential Gaelic poems of the twentieth century were published in the magazine, most notably "Hallaig" by Sorley MacLean in 1954. Gairm also published short stories by Eilidh Watt and Iain Crichton Smith. There were also translations (for example the poetry of Anna Achmatova translated by Christopher Whyte in issue 125, winter 1983–84) and other Gaelic literary works (for example, by Dòmhnall Eachann Meek or Dòmhnall MacAmhlaigh) were an important part of Gairm.

When Gairm ceased to publish, a new magazine, Gath (2003–2008), took its place, followed by Steall, whose first issue was published in 2016.

== Writers ==
Writers whose work was included in Gairm include:

- Sorley MacLean
- Iain Crichton Smith
- George Campbell Hay
- Christopher Whyte
- Dòmhnall Eachann Meek
- Dòmhnall MacAmhlaigh
- Eilidh Watt
- Iain Moireach
- Maoilios Caimbeul
- Catrìona NicGumaraid
- Derick Thomson
- Iain MacLeòid
- Anna Frater
