= Catrìona NicGumaraid =

Scottish poet (1947–2024)

Catrìona NicGumaraid (English: Catriona Montgomery; 22 March 1947 – 5 January 2024) was a Scottish Gaelic poet.

== Biography ==
Catrìona NicGumaraid was born at Roag near Dunvegan on the Isle of Skye. She was educated on Skye and at the University of Glasgow, where she studied Celtic and Scottish history. She then attended Jordanhill College to qualify as a secondary teacher. She began to write poetry both in Gaelic and English in the 1970s, and published her first collection of poems in 1974.

== Career ==
=== Teaching ===
After graduating, NicGumaraid taught Gaelic and Modern Studies at Penilee Secondary School in Glasgow. Later in her career she taught in Dundee.

In 1973, she became the first writer in residence at Sabhal Mòr Ostaig on Skye.

=== Writing ===
NicGumaraid first published her poetry in 1970, in the magazine Gairm.

Her poetry explored themes of love, family, religion, and land. She cited Sorley MacLean as one of her influences. In 2003, An Comunn Gàidhealach awarded NicGumaraid the hundredth Bardic Crown.

=== Acting ===
In the late 1970s, she appeared in the TV series Can Seo. Through the 1980s, she also appeared in other Scottish Gaelic programs.

== Personal life and death ==
NicGumaraid was married to Thomas McLaughlin and had two children. She died on 5 January 2024, at the age of 76.

== Selected poems ==
- 'Cearcall mun Ghealaich'
- 'Urnaigh na Ban-Tigrich'
- 'A' Chraobh'
- 'Gun Stiùir'

== Publications ==
- A' Choille Chiar (English: The Dusky Wood (1974) Glasgow: Clò-Beag – published with her sister, Mòrag NicGumaraid
- Rè na h-Oidhche (English: The Length of the Night) (1994) Edinburgh: Canongate
- Àilleagan am Measg nam Flùr (English: The Beauty Amongst the Flowers) (2018) Glasgow: Comhairle nan Leabhraichean

Anthologies

- An Aghaidh na Sìorraidheachd: Ochdnar Bhàrd Gàidhlig (English: In the Face of Eternity: Eight Gaelic Poets) (1991) Edinburgh: Polygon – edited by Christopher Whyte
- An Tuil: Anthology of 20th Century Scottish Gaelic Verse (1999) Edinburgh: Polygon – edited by Ronald Black

Editorial work

- Òrain Aonghais agus an Sgiobair (English: Songs of Angus and The Skipper) (1980) – the songs of Aonghas Fleidsear (1896–1983) and Iain MacNeacail (1903–1999). Dundee: Catrìona NicGumaraid
