= Dàna =

- Type: Online magazine
- Format: Digital
- Founded: 2014
- Ceased publication: 2020

Dàna, which means 'bold' or 'imprudent' in Scottish Gaelic, was an independent online magazine written entirely in Scottish Gaelic, founded in 2014. It was run by a team of volunteers, accepts article submissions via e-mail, and published articles until 2020.

== Intent ==
The magazine described its intent as follows:

- cha robh iris Ghàidhlig sam bith ann, mar sin bha sinn airson a bhith a’ lìonadh beàrn le rudeigin snasail ’s spòrsail 'there wasn't any Gaelic magazine at all, so we endeavor to fill the lack thereof with fun and articulate content'
- bha sinn airson a’ Ghàidhlig àbhaisteachadh, gu h-àraidh air-loidhne 'we wanted to normalize Gaelic, especially online'
- bha sinn airson cothroman cleachdaidh a chruthachadh a thaobh na Gàidhlig san fharsaingeachd 'we wanted opportunities for readers to appreciate Gaelic in general'
- bha sinn airson leughadh agus sgrìobhadh na Gàidhlig a bhrosnachadh gu sònraichte 'in particular, we wanted to read and write in Gaelic to raise its status'

== History ==
Dàna started to publish in 2013 after the news that Cothrom, the Gaelic magazine for learners by Clì, would be coming to an end (it has since gone to a digital form). Dàna was the first Gaelic e-zine. Conscious of the disruption caused by the sudden closure of earlier Scottish Gaelic periodicals, including Cothrom and the literary magazines Gairm and Gath due to cessation of grants, Dàna elected to remain independent of external funding decisions. As a result, the editors and contributors are all volunteers.

== Content ==
A variety of articles were published digitally, including news, politics, technology, Gaelic-interest, general interest, literature and other.

The magazine, which avoided the use of English wherever possible, called attention to the abundance of English on purportedly Gaelic-language media, especially BBC Alba, and what they considered excessive attempts to make the media accessible to English speakers at the expense of Gaelic speakers.

== See also ==
- List of newspapers in Scotland
