= Calum Maclean (folklorist) =

Scottish folklorist

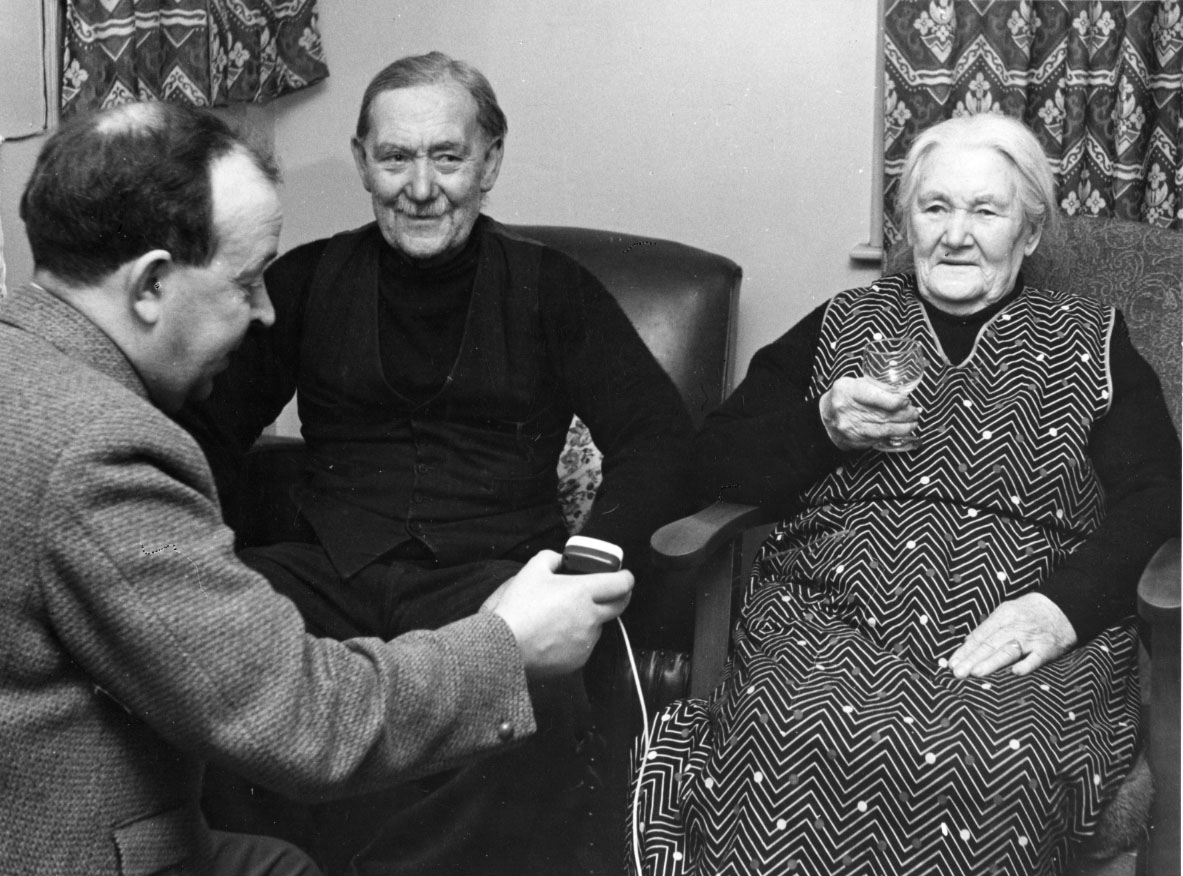
Calum Maclean recording Angus Maclellan and his sister, Mrs. Neil Campbell, in Frobost, South Uist. Photo by Dr. Kenneth Robertson, 1959.

Calum Iain Maclean (Scottish Gaelic: Calum Iain MacGillEathain; 6 September 1915 – 17 August 1960), was a Scottish folklorist, collector, ethnographer and author.

== Early life ==
Maclean was born in Òsgaig, Isle of Raasay, Scotland, into a family of five boys and two girls. His father was Malcolm MacLean (1880–1951), who was a tailor. His mother, Kirsty (1886–1974), was the daughter of Sorley Mor Nicolson of Braes, Skye, and his wife, Ishabel.

Maclean's four brothers were the famous Gaelic poet and scholar, Sorley MacLean [Somhairle MacGill-Eain] (1911–1996), a schoolmaster and classicist, John Maclean (1910–1970), and two general practitioners, Dr. Alasdair Maclean (1918–1999), and Dr. Norman Maclean (c.1917-c.1980). Alasdair was also a historian. Ishabel and Mary, his sisters, were also schoolteachers.

== Education ==
Maclean received his early education at Raasay Primary School and then Portree High School (1929–1935), Skye. Maclean then went to the University of Edinburgh (1935–1939) where he took a first in Celtic Studies under the tutelage of two famous Gaelic scholars, Professor William J. Watson (1865–1948), and his son Professor James Carmichael Watson (1910–1942). He won the McCaig and Macpherson scholarships which enabled him to enrol at University College Dublin where he undertook further study in Early Irish under Professor Osborn Bergin (1872–1950) and in Medieval and Modern Welsh under Professor J. Lloyd-Jones (1885–1965).

== The craft of folklore ==
At the outbreak of the Second World War, Maclean's studies came to a temporary halt and he had to cast around for some other means of livelihood. At first he worked in a factory in Clonmel, County Tipperary, and from there he went to stay in Inverin, just west of Galway City in Connemara. While living there, Maclean began to take an interest in the local Irish folklore, inspired by the Gaelic revival and the writings of Douglas Hyde (1860–1949). With relative ease Maclean acquired a particular skill in the Connaught Irish spoken in the Gaeltacht and was appointed by Professor Séamus Ó Duilearga (1899–1980) as a part-time collector for the Irish Folklore Commission (Coimisiún Béaloideasa Éireann).

Like all other members of his family, MacLean had been raised in the Free Presbyterian Church of Scotland, which his brother Sorely later described as "the strictest of Calvinist fundamentalism". While living in Connemara during the Emergency, however, Calum Maclean rejected his strict Calvinist upbringing and was received into the Roman Catholic Church. From August 1942 to February 1945, Maclean sent a considerable amount of lore in the local Conamara Theas dialect to the Commission, amounting to six bound volumes. From March 1945 Maclean was employed as a temporary cataloguer by the Commission in Dublin. During the next few months, Maclean learnt the scientific craft of folklore, extracting excerpts from 19th century printed Scottish Gaelic tale collections and gaining experience in cataloguing.

== Irish Folklore Commission ==
On 19 December 1945, the Irish Folklore Commission sent Calum Maclean to the Hebrides with an ediphone as a recording device. The Commission intended to fund at least one attempt at scientific folklore collecting before the last Scottish Gaelic storytellers and traditional singers who had escaped the coercive Anglicisation of the 1872 Education Act had died. Maclean was fully conscious of the task that lay before him and applied himself to the work with gusto. An entry from a diary, which he wrote in Gaelic, gives an insight into his work as an ethnographer at this time:

Thòisich mise, Calum I. Mac Gille Eathain, a' cruinneachadh beul-airthris agus litreachas beóil ann an eilean Ratharsair am paraiste Phort-righeadh anns an Eilean Sgitheanach air an 19mh lá de 'n Dùdhlachd (Nodhlaig) 1945. Rugadh mi agus chaidh mo thogail anns an eilean seo. An uair a bha mise òg bha tòrr dhaoine anns an eilean seo aig a robh sgeulachdan agus seann-òrain nach deachaidh a sgrìobhadh sios riamh is nach téid a sgrìobhadh sios gu bràth. Tha an t-seann-fheadhainn an nis marbh agus thug iad gach rud a bha aca leotha do'n uaigh. Có dhiubh tha cuid de dhaoine ann fhathast a chuimhneachas bloighean de na h-òrain a bhiodh aca agus bloighean de'n t-seanchas eile cuideachd. Shaoil mi gu robh barrachd òran air am fàgail anns an eilean seo na bha de aon rud eile. Uime sin chuir mi romham na h-òrain a sgrìobhadh sios uile mar a chuala mi aig na daoine iad. Ach sgrìobh mi sios cuideachd gach rud a thachair rium. Tha fhios agam gu bheil sinn tri fichead bliadhna ro anamoch gu tòiseachadh air an obair seo, ach dh 'fhaoite gu sàbhail sinn rud air chor eigin fhathast, mun téid a uile a dhìth…

I, Calum I. Maclean, began two days ago to collect the oral tradition of the island of Raasay. I was born and reared on this island. When I was young there were many people here who had tales and songs which had never been written down, and which never will be, since the old people are now dead, and all that they knew is with them in the grave. There are still some people alive who remember some of the songs and traditions of their forefathers, and as it seemed to me that there are more songs than anything else available, I decided to write down those which I could find. I realise that we are sixty years late in beginning this work of collection, but we may be able to save at least some of the traditional lore before it dies out…

It was clear from Maclean's preliminary collections (mainly from his own relations) in Raasay that there was still a great deal to collect and, in light of this, the Irish Folklore Commission took the decision in summer 1946 to send Maclean back to the Gàidhealtachd to that he could continue his work in the field. This was enabled by an official grant from the Irish State of £2,000. Over the next four and a half years (from June 1946 to the end of December 1950), while still in the employ of the Commission, Maclean worked assiduously in collecting a further nineteen bound volumes of lore (amounting to over 9,000 manuscript pages) as well as his diaries, amounting to a further five full bound volumes (over 2,000 manuscript pages). It was during this period that Maclean collected the longest story ever recorded in Scotland, the 58,000 words of Alasdair mac a' Cheird (Alasdair son of the Caird), told to him in 1949 by Angus MacMillan. This almost doubled the previous "record" of the 30,000 words of Leigheas Coise Cein (The Healing of Kane's Leg), recorded from Lachlin MacNeill, an Islayman, by John Francis Campbell and Hector Maclean in 1870.

== School of Scottish Studies ==
On New Year's Day 1951, Maclean formally began to work for the newly founded School of Scottish Studies based at his alma mater, the University of Edinburgh. Since being given this long overdue institutional berth, the systematic collection of Scottish Gaelic and Scots folklore began in earnest through the avid work of Calum Maclean, the School's first appointed collector, Hamish Henderson (1919–2002), John MacInnes (1930-), to name but a few, and their successors. The very first recordings that he made for the School included no less than 524 Gaelic tales from a roadman encountered "in the dead of winter, and Lochaber lay white and deep in snow." The last that Maclean made were literally on his death bed.

== Modern systematic collection ==
Maclean was the first person to undertake the systematic collection of the old Gaelic songs, stories and traditions in the Highlands and Islands with modern recording apparatus. Therein lies the importance of his work. A good deal had been done previously in the way of collecting old stories in the Highlands by John Francis Campbell of Islay (1821–1885) and his collectors, but lacking any means of making mechanical recordings, their task of writing down such tales from dictation was a very laborious one, and J. F. Campbell himself admitted that his collection in no way exhausted the stories current in the Highlands "whole districts are yet untried, and whole classes of stories, such as popular history and robber stories, have yet been untouched."

Most importantly, Maclean spent a little over a year (from Summer 1951 to Autumn 1952) undertaking professional training at Uppsala University in Sweden which was then, as now, at the forefront of folklore methodology, cataloguing and archival techniques. Maclean benefited greatly by what he learnt at this institution as well as his time at the Irish Folklore Commission. Having studied under Professor Dag Strömbäck, he later set up an index system for Scottish folklore at the School of Scottish Studies based on the Uppsala one. Maclean's fieldwork experience, in-depth knowledge of Gaelic oral tradition and broad academic knowledge provided him with a unique combination of skills that were advantageous to collecting. In addition, Maclean had a remarkable facility to put people at ease and so gained their confidence. He stressed this observation in one of his articles that "for any folklore collector the crucial time is when contact is first made with the tradition bearer" and that "every folklore collector must be prepared to efface himself and approach even the most humble tradition bearer with the deference due to the high and exalted." Due to abiding by this principle, Maclean was able to find contacts and tradition bearers and by doing so he managed to gather in a vast amount of oral material straight from people's memories. Out of the hundreds of people recorded by Maclean, there were four storytellers that struck him as exceptionally talented: Seumas MacKinnon, known as Seumas Iain Ghunnairigh, (c. 1866-c.1957), from Northbay in Barra, Duncan MacDonald, Donnchadh Mac Dhòmhnaill 'ic Dhonnchaidh, (1882–1954), from Peninerine in South Uist, Angus (Barrach) MacMillan (1874–1954), from Griminish in Benbecula and John (The Bard) MacDonald (1876–1964) from Highbridge in Brae Lochaber.

== Legacy ==
Maclean was diagnosed with cancer in 1956, necessitating the amputation of his left arm the following year. He continued to work. His only major publication was "The Highlands" (1959); his uncompromising view of the Highland people, history and culture from the perspective of a Gaelic-speaking insider received many favourable critical reviews on publication. Apart from a few academic papers and popular publications, Maclean's foremost legacy is his vast collection of mainly Gaelic oral tradition carried out in the field over from 1946 to 1960. The vast majority of the collection was made in the Western Isles (in South Uist, Benbecula and Barra) and on the mainland Scottish Highlands. Maclean was always conscious of being a successor to those great collectors who had gone before him: John Francis Campbell (1821-1885), Hector Maclean (1818–1892), John Dewar (1802–1872), Alexander Carmichael (1832–1912), Fr. Allan MacDonald (1859–1905), as well as many others.

== Death ==
On 17 August 1960 Calum Maclean died of cancer at the age of 44 in the Sacred Heart Hospital, Daliburgh, South Uist, Scotland. He was to have received, in September of that year, from the St. Francis Xavier University at Antigonish, Nova Scotia – an institution with very strong connections to the Gàidhealtachd – the degree of LL.D., honoris causa, for recognition of his work for the preservation of Gaelic oral literature. It was a fitting honour for a scholar – the one word that he pleaded not to have marked on his gravestone – who had spent so many long hours collecting in the field. He was buried in Hallan Cemetery, South Uist, an island that not only claimed him but one that he claimed to be his own. His brother, Sorley MacLean, wrote a moving elegy typifying for many the great loss felt at his death:

Tha iomadh duine bochd an Albainn
dhan tug thu togail agus cliù;
’s ann a thog thu ’n t-iriosail
a chuir ar linn air chùl.
Thug iad dhutsa barrachd
na bheireadh iad do chàch
on thug thu dhaibh an dùrachd
bu ghrìosaich fo do bhàigh.
Mhothaich iadsan an dealas
a bha socair na do dhòigh,
thuig iad doimhne throm do dhaondachd
nuair b’aotroime do spòrs.

There is many a poor man in Scotland
Whose spirit and name you raised;
You lifted the humble
Whom our age put aside.
They gave you more
Than they would give the others
Since you gave them the zeal
That was a fire beneath your kindness
They sensed the vehemence
That was gentle in your ways,
They understood the heavy depths of your humanity
When your fun was at its lightest.

== Selected bibliography ==
'Traditional Songs from Raasay and their value as Folk-Literature', The Transactions of the Gaelic Society of Inverness, vol. XXXIX/XL (1942–50), 176-92
'Sgéalta as Albain', Béaloideas: The Journal of the Folklore of Ireland Society, vol. XV (1945), 237-48
'Gaidheil Eireann agus am Beul-Aithris', Alba, vol. 1 (1948), 44-47
'Hebridean Storytellers', ARV: Journal of Scandinavian Studies, vol. 8 (1952), 120-29
'Tales and Traditions among the Older Folk', Old People's Welfare Scottish Bulletin (July, 1954)
'Death Divination in Scottish Folk Tradition', The Transactions of the Gaelic Society of Inverness, vol. XLII (1953–59), 56-67
'Aonghus agus Donnchadh', Gairm, air. 10 (An Geamhradh, 1954), 170-74
'A Legend of the Cross,' ARV: Journal of Scandinavian Studies, vol. 11 (1955), 150-51
'Hebridean Traditions', Gwerin: Journal of Folk life, vol. 1, no. 1 (1956), 21-33
'A Shetland Version of the Legend of Don Juan', Shetland Folk Book, vol. 3 (1957), 65-67
'Am Ministear agus an Claban', Scottish Studies, vol. 1 (1957), 65-69
'International Folk-Tales in the Archives', Scottish Studies, vol. 2 (1958), 113-17
'A Folk-Variant of Táin Bó Cúailnge from Uist', ARV: Journal of Scandinavian Studies, vol. 15 (1959), 160-81
'A Variant of the Charm of the Lasting Life from Uist', Saga och Sed (1959), 75-78
'An Donn Ghuailleann', Gairm, air. 29 (Am Foghar, 1959), 67-71
The Highlands (London: Batsford, 1959) [repr. Inverness: Club Leabhar, 1975; Edinburgh: Mainstream, 1990, 2006]
'Traditional Beliefs in Scotland', Scottish Studies, vol. 3 (1959), 189-200
'A Collection of Riddles from Shetland', Scottish Studies, vol. 4 (1960), 150-86 [with Stewart F. Sanderson]
'Fairy Stories from Lochaber', Scottish Studies, vol. 4 (1960), 84-95
'The Study of (the) Folklore', An Gaidheal, vol. 55 (1960), 80-82; 104-06; 117-18
'Is daor a cheannaich mi 'n t-iasgach', Scottish Gaelic Studies, vol. IX, pt. 1 (1961), 1-8
'Folktale Studies in Scotland', Internationaler Kongreß der Volkserzählungsforscher in Kiel und Kopenhagen (19.8.—29.8.1959) (Berlin, 1961), 169-71
'The Last Sheaf', Scottish Studies, vol. 8 (1964), 193-207
