= Stuart MacGregor =

Stuart MacGregor may refer to:

- Stuart MacGregor (writer)
- Stuart MacGregor (squash player)

== See also ==
- Stuart McGregor, Canadian Paralympic athlete
