= Lazybed =

Play written by Iain Crichton Smith

Lazybed is a play written by author and playwright Iain Crichton Smith. It was first performed in the Traverse Theatre in Edinburgh, Scotland, on 10 October 1997 with a cast of seven.

== Plot ==
It follows the story of Murdoch, a middle-aged man who takes to his bed for "metaphysical reasons". A series of visitors come and see him in his 'horizontal' state: his mother, his brother, his nosey neighbour 'Snoopy', a life insurance salesman, his local minister, a "medical specialist", and Death – a cheerful, sunny man. The death of his mother shakes him out of his bed and into life, and while his friendship with Death, who is having issues of his own, develops, Murdoch sets about falling in love.

== Characters ==
Murdo – 39-year-old man

Death – Optimistic grim reaper

Mother – Older lady, Murdo's mother

Neighbour – Older lady, gossip

Judith – Adult lady, love interest

Specialist – Medical specialist

Salesman – Sells insurance

Brother – thirty-something, Murdo's brother

Minister – Stereotypical Church of Scotland Minister

Immanuel Kant – Cloaked metaphysicist

'Voice' – Voice, sounding rather like Murdo's

== Publication ==
It is published in the anthology Scotland Plays, published by Nick Hern Books.
