= Consider the Lilies (novel) =

1968 novel by Iain Crichton Smith

- First Edition Cover (Gollancz)
- Author: Iain Crichton Smith
- Language: English
- Publication date: 1968
- Pages: 192

Consider the Lilies is a novel by Iain Crichton Smith first published in 1968. The book is set in the context of the Highland Clearances and follows an elderly woman who is suffering a religious crisis.

In 2013 the book was named 7th on a list of the 50 best Scottish books of the last 50 years by the Scottish Book Trust.
