= Iain Moireach =

Scottish Gaelic writer

- Born: 27 March 1938; Barvas, Isle of Lewis, Scotland
- Died: 17 November 2018 (aged 80)
- Education: Nicolson Institute
- Alma mater: University of Edinburgh
- Occupation: Writer
- Spouse: Nora Murray
- Relatives: Finlay and Jessie Anne Murray
- Writing career
- Pen name: John Murray
- Language: Scots Gaelic
- Genres: Poetry, screenplays, and short stories
- Notable work: An rathad dhachaigh

Iain Moireach (John Murray) (27 March 1938 – 17 November 2018) was a Scottish Gaelic writer from Barvas, Isle of Lewis. He wrote poetry, screenplays, and short stories.

He published many short stories in the Gaelic magazines Gairm and Gath.

== Life ==
Moireach was born in Barvas, Lewis. He was educated at the Nicolson Institute and at the University of Edinburgh. He taught at a school in Musselburgh. He was the editor for Comunn nan Leabhraichean since 1969.

He was the son of Finlay and Jessie Anne Murray (née MacLeod), and married his wife Nora Murray (Borve, Isle of Lewis) on 29 July 1968. Nora died on 5 April 2010.

=== Notable short stories ===
- 'Am Bucas'
- 'Am Partaidh'
- 'Briseadh na Cloiche '
- 'Dà mhionad, no Fracas'
- 'An Dealachadh'
- 'Feòil a' Gheamhraidh'
- 'Mo Chrannchur'

== Books ==
=== Novels ===
- An rathad dhachaigh (Stornoway: Acair, 1994)

=== Short stories ===
- An Aghaigh Choimheach (1973)

=== Scripts ===
- Snìomh nan dual (Stornoway: Acair, 2007) consisting of:

- Feumaidh sinne bhith gàireachdainn
- Balaich a' chruidh
- An coigreach
- Rèiteach
- An treas fàd

=== Editing ===
- Caimbeul, Aonghas. Suathadh ri iomadh rubha: eachdraidh a bheatha ed. Iain Moireach (Glasgow: Gairm, 1973)
