= Stuart MacGregor (writer) =

Scottish poet, novelist and songwriter

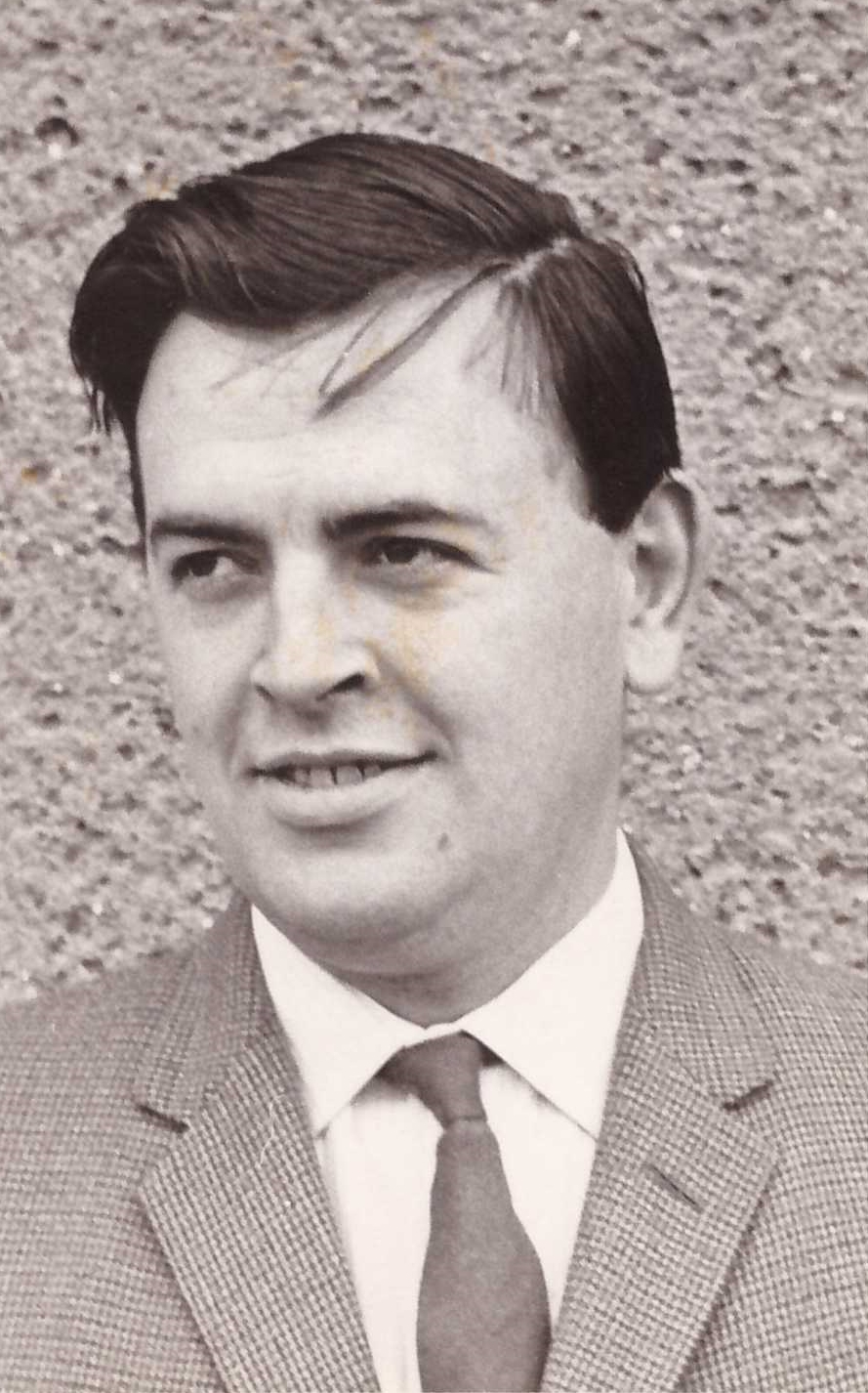
- MacGregor photographed in Germany, 1962
- Born: 1 September 1935; Edinburgh, Scotland
- Died: 25 January 1973 (aged 37); Jamaica
- Education: Edinburgh University
- Occupation: Writer
- Writing career
- Genre: Scottish literature
- Notable works: The Sinner, The Myrtle and The Ivy

Stuart MacGregor was a Scottish poet, novelist and songwriter.

MacGregor attended medical school in Edinburgh and held several hospital positions in the city before being called up for National Service. He later taught social medicine, both in Scotland and the West Indies. MacGregor died in a car crash in Jamaica in 1973, aged thirty-seven. Following his death, a Stuart MacGregor Memorial Prize was established by Edinburgh's Department of Community Health.

In 1958, with Hamish Henderson, MacGregor co-founded the Edinburgh University Folk Society and was its first President. He wrote a number of widely recorded folk songs about Edinburgh life including the humorous "Sandy Bell's Man" about dating medical students, and the romantic "Coshieville."

MacGregor's poetry appeared in an anthology published by Reprographia in 1970, Four Points of a Saltire. This featured the work of four Scottish poets, the others being Sorley MacLean, George Campbell Hay and William Neill. MacGregor's two novels were The Myrtle and Ivy (1967) and The Sinner (1973), both set in the Edinburgh folk scene. A radio play, The Month of Mary Paterson, was broadcast by BBC Scotland in 1968.

== Selected bibliography ==
- The Myrtle and the Ivy (Loanhead: Macdonald Publishers 1967)
- Four Points of a Saltire: the poetry of Sorley MacLean, George Campbell Hay, Willam Neill, Stuart MacGregor (Edinburgh: Reprographia, 1970)
- The Sinner (London: Calder & Boyars, 1973)
- Poems and Songs (Loanhead: Macdonald Publishers, 1974)
