= Gath (magazine) =

Scottish Gaelic magazine

Gath is the name of a Scottish Gaelic language magazine that was published by Gath Earranta. The first edition was published in August 2003, intending to replace the older Gairm magazine, which had closed. Gath aimed to reproduce the mainstream appeal of its predecessor, whilst attracting a younger audience with fresh topics, such as contemporary music and current events. Each issue contained a number of short stories, essays, and poems; over 500 short stories were published in the magazine. Bòrd na Gàidhlig provided a £5000 foundational grant and ongoing support, and Gath was published biannually from 2003 until at least 2008. The reception was generally positive. Writers who published in the magazine include some of the most respected Gaelic writers, such as Christopher Whyte, Aonghas Phàdraig Caimbeul, Maoilios Caimbeul, Meg Bateman, Aonghas Dubh MacNeacail, Iain Moireach, Alison Lang, Moray Watson, Rob Shirley, Fionnlagh MacLeoid, Gregor Addison and Eilidh Rosach. The editors were Dòmhnall E. Meek, Jo NicDhomhnaill, and Richard Cox.

The name "Gath" means "ray of light."
