= Bayble =

Village in Point on the Isle of Lewis

Coordinates: 58.204°N 6.215°W

Bayble: Scottish Gaelic: Pabail
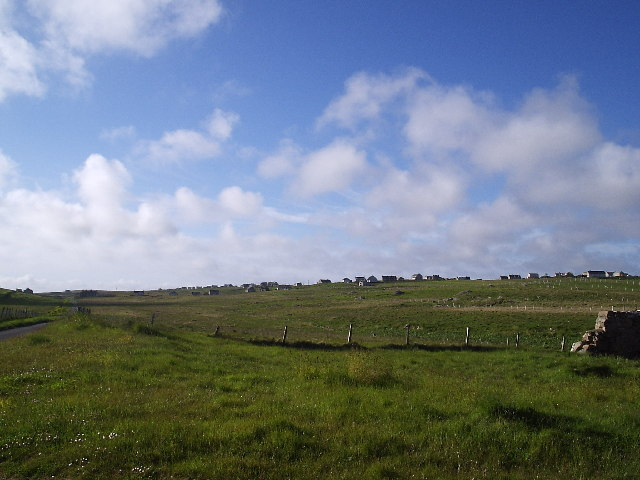
- Pabail

- Location within the Outer Hebrides
- Language: Scottish Gaelic; English
- OS grid reference: NB523316
- Civil parish: Stornoway
- Council area: Na h-Eileanan Siar
- Lieutenancy area: Western Isles
- Country: Scotland
- Sovereign state: United Kingdom
- Post town: ISLE OF LEWIS
- Postcode district: HS2
- Dialling code: 01851
- Police: Scotland
- Fire: Scottish
- Ambulance: Scottish
- UK Parliament: Na h-Eileanan an Iar
- Scottish Parliament: Na h-Eileanan an Iar

Bayble (Scottish Gaelic: Pabail) is a village in Point (An Rubha), on the Isle of Lewis, 6 miles (10 kilometres) east of Stornoway. Bayble is also within the parish of Stornoway.

There are around 400 people living in Bayble. It is separated into Upper and Lower Bayble by a burn at the bottom of the valley. Upper Bayble (Scottish Gaelic: Pabail Uarach) had a community shop, Murdo's, which has now closed after 44 years of service. Upper Bayble has produced three internationally recognised writers of poetry and prose, Iain Crichton Smith, Derick Thomson and Anne Frater. The former writing predominantly in English and the latter two writing almost exclusively in Gaelic. Lower Bayble (Scottish Gaelic: Pabail Iarach) is a seaside crofting township. The village overlooks Bayble Bay (Bàgh Phabail), with Bayble Island (Eilean Phabail) at the south end and Eilean a' Chàise to the north.
