= Bayble Island =

Uninhabited island in the Outer Hebrides of Scotland

Coordinates: 58°11′25″N 6°12′2″W

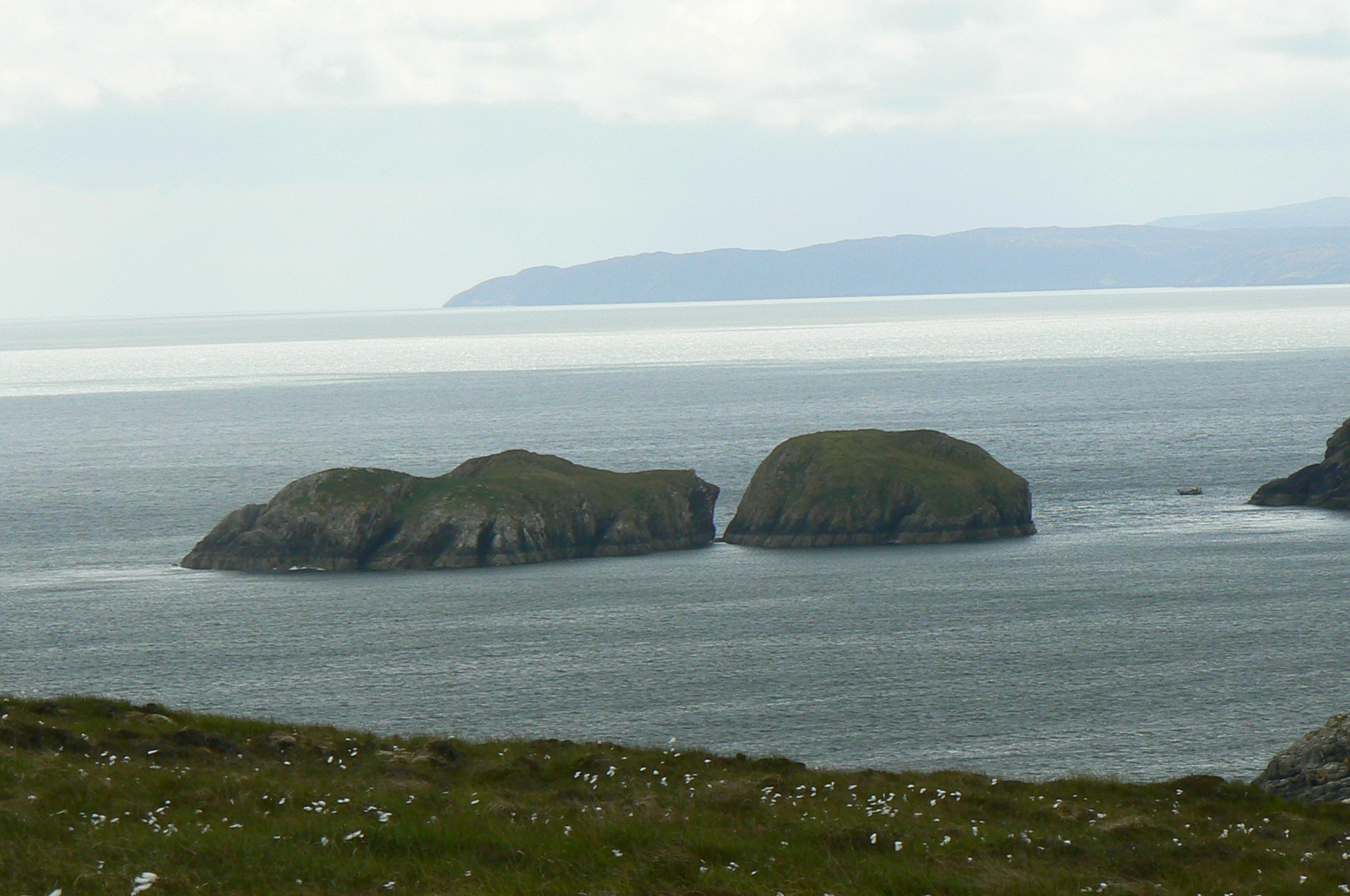
Bayble Island from Upper Bayble

Bayble Island (Scottish Gaelic: Eilean Phabail) is an uninhabited island off the south coast of the Eye Peninsula of Lewis, in the Outer Hebrides of Scotland.

Bayble Island lies at the southern end of Bayble Bay (Pabail Bay). It consists of two islands, Eilean Mòr Phabaill and Eilean Beag Phabaill, but these appear as a single island from most directions. The hamlets of Upper and Lower Bayble overlook the island and bay.

== Wildlife ==
Rats are thought to have arrived on the island, as to the Shiant Islands, from a shipwreck (although this may be folklore). Gannets and other seabirds can be seen on the island and diving into the surrounding waters.

== See also ==
- List of islands of Scotland
