= John MacDougall Hay =

Scottish novelist

John MacDougall Hay (23 October 1880 – 10 December 1919) was a Scottish novelist.

He was born and grew up in Tarbert, Argyll. He graduated in 1900 with an M.A. from the University of Glasgow. He was initially a school teacher in Stornaway, but then became a Church of Scotland minister. He was the father of Sheena Campbell Hay (1911–1987) and George Campbell Hay, the Scottish Gaelic poet.

He is mainly known for his novel Gillespie (1914), set in a fictionalised version of his home town of Tarbert. It received favourable reviews when it was published in 1914, but was largely forgotten until it was re-discovered in the late 20th century. He also wrote a second novel Barnacles (1916), and a collection of poems Their Dead Sons (1918). In the year of his death, he was planning a third novel set in the Church of Scotland and to be entitled The Martyr.

In poor health for much of his adult life, he died of tuberculosis at the age of only 39.
