= Anne Frater =

Scottish poet (born 1967)

Anne Frater (born 1967) is a Scottish poet. She was born at Stornoway on Lewis in the Outer Hebrides. She was brought up in the village of Upper Bayble in the district of Point, a small community which has also been home to Derick Thomson and Iain Crichton Smith.

== Early life ==
Frater graduated from the University of Glasgow with a first class honours degree in Celtic and French. She qualified for a teaching qualification from Jordanhill College and in 1995 was awarded a PhD from the University of Glasgow for her thesis on Scottish Gaelic women's poetry up to 1750.

== Career ==
She lectures at Lews Castle College in Stornoway, part of the University of the Highlands and Islands, where she teaches on Gaelic-medium degree courses, and is Programme Leader for the BAH Gaelic Scotland.

Her poems have been included in a variety of anthologies of Scottish Gaelic poetry and has been published in magazines such as Chapman and Verse. Her first anthology of poems, Fo'n t-Slige (English: Under the Shell), was published in 1995, and her second collection, Cridhe Creige, in 2017.

In March 2016, a selection of ten poems, Anns a’ Chànan Chùbhraidh/En la lengua fragante, was premiered by her and translator Miguel Teruel in a public reading at the University of Valencia. The poems were read in Scottish Gaelic by Frater followed by the Spanish version by Teruel.

== Style ==
Her poetry analyses identity and nation as well as love, landscape and language. She mainly writes in free verse.
