= Ujević =

Ujević is a Croatian surname that may refer to

- Marija Ujević-Galetović (born 1933), Croatian sculptor
- Mate Ujević (1901–1967), Croatian poet and encyclopedist
- Tin Ujević (1891–1955), Croatian poet
  - Tin Ujević Award for contributions to Croatian poetry
  - MV Tin Ujević, a Croatian passenger cruiseferry
