= Guth na Bliadhna =

Guth na Bliadhna ("Voice of the Year") was a Scottish Gaelic and English-language magazine published between 1904 and 1925 in Glasgow. It was known for its focus on politics, particularly issues radical at the time such as Scottish independence and even the political union of Ireland, Scotland, and other Celtic-language speaking areas. The magazine was established by a Roman Catholic, Ruaraidh Arascain is Mhàirr, a Lowland Scottish aristocrat who had learned Gaelic from a nurse. The next long-running Gaelic periodical would be Gairm, first published in 1952. Patrick Pearse once contributed to the publication.
