= Christopher Whyte =

Scottish writer, translator and critic

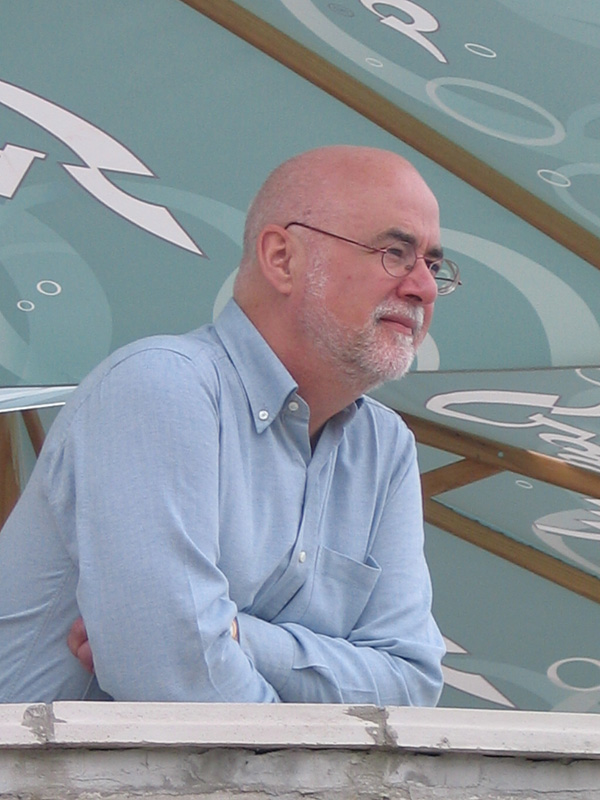
Christopher Whyte

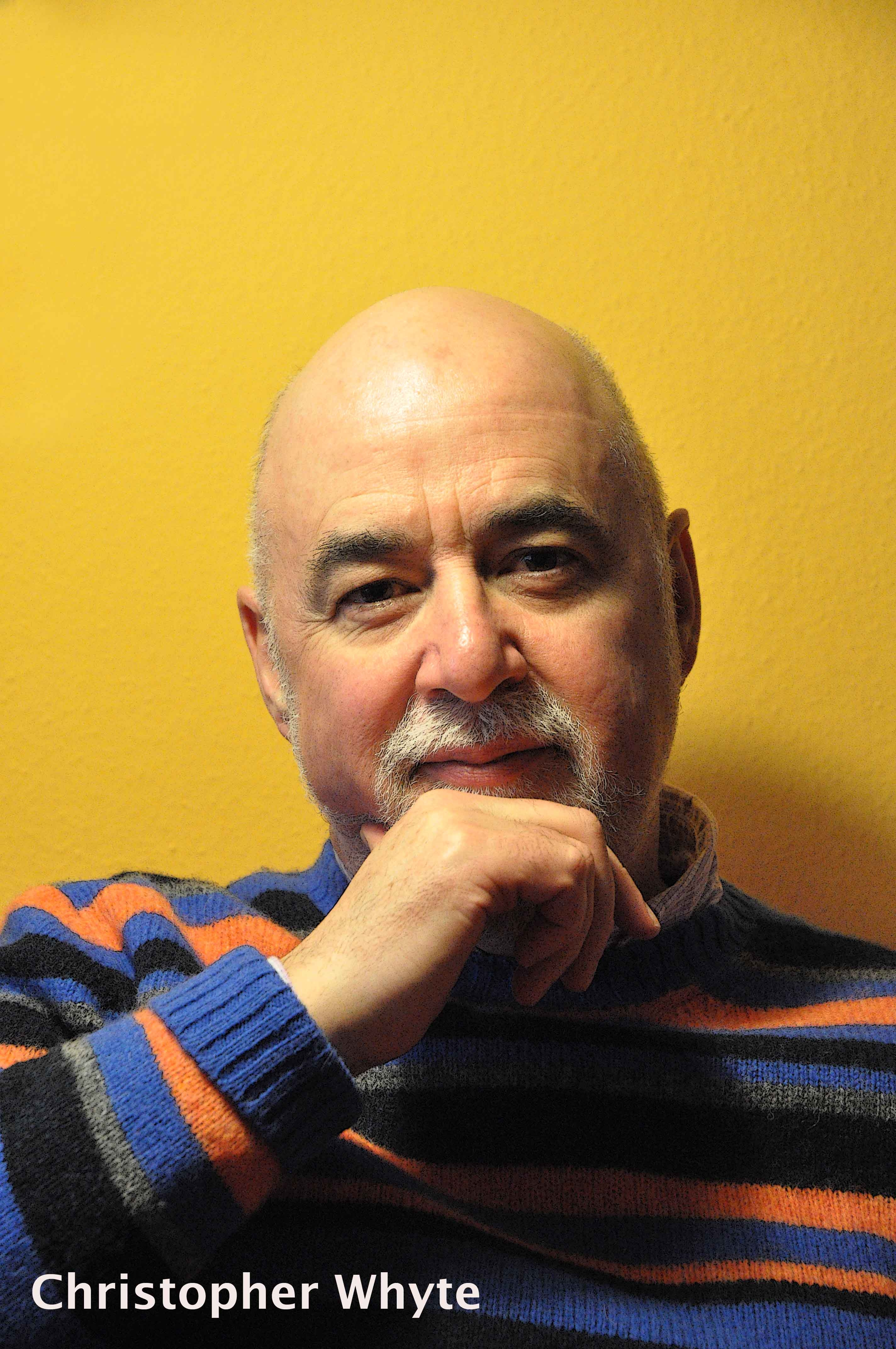
Christopher Whyte

Christopher Whyte (Crìsdean MacIlleBhàin; born 29 October 1952) is a Scottish poet, novelist, translator and critic. He is a novelist in English, a poet in Scottish Gaelic, the translator into English of Marina Tsvetaeva, Pier Paolo Pasolini and Rainer Maria Rilke, and a critic of Scottish and international literature. His work in Gaelic appears under the name Crìsdean MacIlleBhàin.

Whyte first published some translations of modern poetry into Gaelic, including poems by Konstantinos Kavafis, Yannis Ritsos and Anna Akhmatova. He then published two collections of original poetry in Gaelic, Uirsgeul (Myth), 1991 and An Tràth Duilich (The Difficult Time), 2002. In the meantime he started to write prose in English and has published four novels, Euphemia MacFarrigle and the Laughing Virgin (1995), The Warlock of Strathearn (1997), The Gay Decameron (1998) and The Cloud Machinery (2000).

In 2002, Whyte won a Scottish Research Book of the Year award for his edition of Sorley Maclean's Dàin do Eimhir (Poems to Eimhir), published by the Association for Scottish Literary Studies. He has also compiled some anthologies of present-day Gaelic poetry and written critical articles and essays.

== Biography ==
Whyte was born in the West End of Glasgow (Scotland) on 29 October 1952. His maternal grandparents were Irish Catholic immigrants from Counties Donegal and Tyrone. His father's family, on the other hand, was of Scottish Presbyterian stock.

He was educated in Glasgow by Jesuits at St Aloysius' College, and took the English tripos at Pembroke College, Cambridge, between 1970 and 1973. He spent most of the next 12 years in Italy, teaching under Agostino Lombardo in the Department of English and American Studies at Rome's La Sapienza University from 1977 to 1985. During his years in Italy, a major part of his poetic apprenticeship was served by translating the poetry of Sorley MacLean from Gaelic into the Italian language.

Whyte returned to Scotland to complete a PhD in Scottish Gaelic literature under scholar and poet Derick Thomson (Ruaraidh MacThòmais (1928-2012). From 1986 to 1989 he was lecturer in the Department of English Literature of the University of Edinburgh, then from 1990 to 2005 he taught in the Department of Scottish Literature of the University of Glasgow, rising from lecturer to reader.

Whyte took early retirement in 2005 and moved to live in Budapest, where he writes full-time. Since 2013, he has spent several months each year in Venice.

== Poetry in Scottish Gaelic ==
In 1982, Derick Thomson began to feature in the quarterly review Gairm, of which he was the editor, Whyte's translations into Gaelic of poets including Cavafy, Ritsos, Ujević, Mörike, Akhmatova and Tsvetaeva.

According to Ronald Black, however, it was not until 1987 that Whyte felt comfortable attempting to write original poetry in the Gaelic language. His first collection of original poetry, Uirsgeul/Myth, in Gaelic with the author's facing English translations, was joint winner of a Saltire Award when published by Gairm in 1991. "We may expect substantial original work from his pen," announced Derick Thomson, in the second edition of his Introduction to Gaelic Poetry. An Tràth Duilich (Callander, Diehard Press 2002) is a Gaelic-only collection, containing a pivotal sequence about an urban adolescence troubled by religious and sexual guilt, and a dramatic cantata focusing on the Fontana Maggiore in Perugia, constructed by sculptors Nicola and Giovanni Pisano in 1277–1278. Dealbh Athar (Dublin, Coiscéim 2009) offers a very forthright treatment of how Whyte was molested by his father, its consequences, and the attendant family circumstances, with a translation into Irish by Gréagóir Ó Dúill.

The title sequence in Whyte's fourth collection, Bho Leabhar-Latha Maria Malibran / From the Diary of Maria Malibran (Stornoway, Acair 2009) assumes the voice of the celebrated opera singer (1808-1836) as, in a country retreat not far from Paris, she reflects on her life, her career and her problematic relationship with her father, also an opera star. A combative epilogue affirms the importance of not confining poetry in Gaelic to themes and topics directly related to the society and history of those who speak the language.

Whyte's fifth collection, in Gaelic only, An Daolag Shìonach (The Chinese Beetle) (Glasgow, Clò Gille Moire 2013), brings together uncollected poems for the years from 1987 to 1999, and a rich crop of new work from 2004 to 2007.

Since 2006, Whyte has published a series of longer poems in the yearly anthology New Scottish Writing (Glasgow, Association for Scottish Literary Studies) with facing English translations by Niall O'Gallagher, which have met with considerable acclaim. Tom Adair wrote in The Scotsman of 'Ceum air cheum' / 'Step by step' that 'This poem alone makes the book worth twice the asking price', while Colin Waters in The Scottish Review of Books found Whyte's treatment of his relationship with older poet Sorley MacLean (Somhaire MacGill-Eain (1911-1996)) a 'most memorable contribution ... Powerful emotion coupled with the skill to pull off its depiction.' In 2023, his collection Mo Shearmon (What I Have To Say) was published by Francis Boutle.

== Fiction in English ==
Whyte's first novel, Euphemia MacFarrigle and the Laughing Virgin (London, Gollancz 1995], is a satire on sectarianism in Glasgow, anti-gay prejudice, gay self-repression, and scandals that have afflicted the Catholic Church in Scotland. A group of pious Catholic women stockpile condoms, the Catholic archbishop is afflicted by a farting virus and, in a suburban convent, everything is done to hush up the mystery of no fewer than three "virgin births".

Whyte followed this with the life story of a 17th-century Scottish warlock, in The Warlock of Strathearn (London, Gollancz 1997). The tale is framed by an introduction from a pedantic place-names specialist and an epilogue by this man's gay nephew.

Whyte's third novel is The Gay Decameron. Ten gay men assemble for a dinner party in a flat in Edinburgh's New Town. Gradually, the reader comes to know their stories and the web of desires that links them.

Whyte's fourth novel, The Cloud Machinery (London, Gollanz 2000) is set in early 18th century Venetian Republic. After more than a decade of disuse, the theatre at Sant'Igino once more hosts a programme of operas and comedies. The men and women responsible for mounting the season, however, have to contend with the memories and consequences of what happened on the night the theatre closed down. This novel was translated into Italian as La macchina delle nuvole (Milan, Corbaccio 2002) and into German as Die stumme Sängerin (Berlin, Kindler 2002, paperback Frankfurt-am-Main, Fischer 2005).

== Translating poetry ==
Whyte's first publication, in 1980, was a full English version of the long poem in Italian 'The Ashes of Gramsci' by Pier Paolo Pasolini (1922-1975). It was followed by versions of 'Riches' in 1992 and of the 'Lament of the Mechanical Digger' in 1998. In 1994, jointly with Marco Fazzini, Whyte translated an anthology of fourteen contemporary Italian poets for Lines Review. In 1998, he translated 'Window on Catalonia', a selection of essays, short stories by Quim Monzó and Sergi Pàmies and poems by Gabriel Ferrater, Maria-Mercè Marçal and Narcís Comadira for Chapman magazine. He has contributed to two of the Scottish Poetry Library's bilingual series volumes of 25 poems, At the End of the Broken Bridge (from Hungarian) in 2005 and Light off Water (from Catalan) in 2007. He has recently emerged as a translator of the Russian poet Marina Tsvetaeva (1892-1941), with selections of lyrics in PN Review 197 & 199, the sequence of poems 'With a Woman' on a lesbian relationship with Sofia Parnok in Edinburgh Review 134, and 180 poems written between November 1918 and May 1920 in Moscow in the Plague Year (New York, Archipelago Press 2014).

In the late 1990s, Whyte increasingly spoke out against the pressure from magazine editors and publishers to produce his own English versions of the poems he was writing in Gaelic. He articulated his position in the polemical essay 'Against Self-Translation', the substance of a talk delivered in Reykjavík in December 2001 and published in Translation and Literature in 2002. This was his major contribution to one of the liveliest debates concerning Gaelic writing over the last two decades. The younger Gaelic poet Niall O'Gallagher subsequently emerged as the principal translator of Whyte's poetry into both English and Scots.

Translations from Russian

- Marina Tsvetaeva - Milestones (Shearsman Books, 2015)
- Marina Tsvetaeva - After Russia (The First Notebook) (Shearsman Books, 2017)
- Marina Tsvetaeva - After Russia (The Second Notebook) (Shearsman Books, 2018)
- Marina Tsvetaeva - Youthful Verses (Shearsman Books, 2020)
- Marina Tsvetaeva - Head on a Gleaming Plate – Poems 1917-1918 (Shearsman Books, 2022)

== Other writings ==
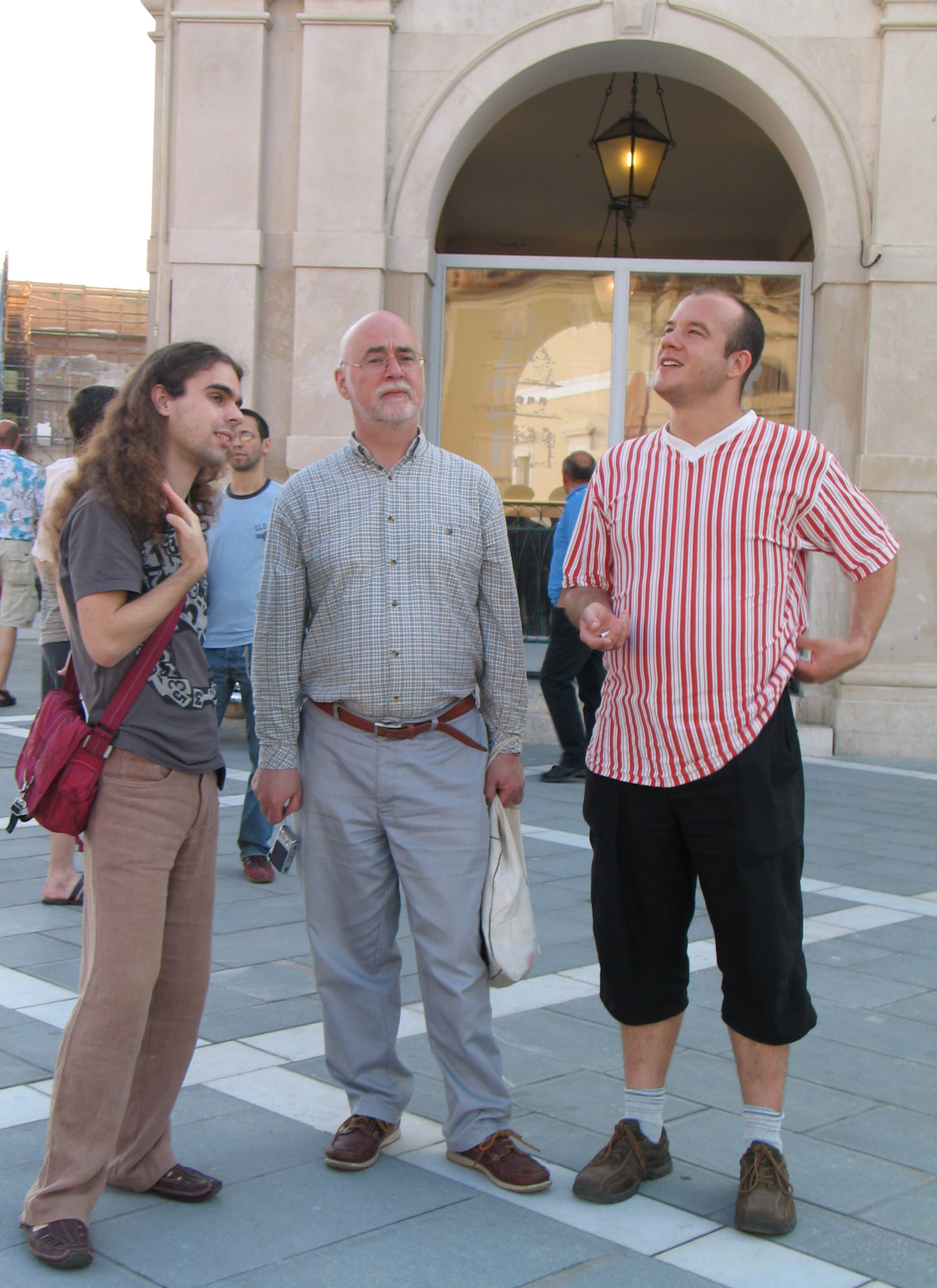
Valery Ledenev from Russia, Christopher Whyte and Andras Gerevich from Hungary at the seminar of gay poets in Piran in 2008

Whyte's readiness to discuss his reading positions as a gay man meant he took a leading role in applying insights from queer studies to readings of Scottish texts. He edited a collection of essays entitled Gendering the Nation in 1995. Two of his most controversial contributions, 'Fishy Masculinities', on the gender ideology of Neil Gunn's fiction, and 'Queer Readings, Gay Texts' on Walter Scott's Redgauntlet and Muriel Spark's The Prime of Miss Jean Brodie, elicited full-length attempts at refutation in the pages of the Scottish Literary Journal.

In 1990, Whyte published a 'coming out' interview with Edwin Morgan, marking the 70th birthday of the man who would become Scotland's first national poet, and breaking a critical silence which had persisted for the better part of three decades.

In a seminal essay on Hugh MacDiarmid's long modernist poem 'A Drunk Man Looks at the Thistle', Whyte applies an interpretive grid inspired by Roland Barthes' reading of Balzac in S/Z. He applied the theories on the ideology of carnival of Russian scholar Mikhail Bakhtin to a range of festive poems in Scots dating from the 15th to the 18th centuries, as well as offering a new look at Robert Burns' most celebrated poem in 'Defamiliarising Tam O' Shanter'.

Whyte's work has been seminal in bringing into the public domain substantial manuscript materials by Sorley MacLean (Somhairle MacGill-Eain 1911–1996), arguably the most significant Gaelic writer of the 20th century. His edition with commentary of the love sequence Dàin do Eimhir was joint winner of the National Library of Scotland award for Research Book of the Year in 2002. His edition with commentary of An Cuilithionn 1939 and Unpublished Poems was launched during a conference to celebrate the centenary of the poet's birth held at the Gaelic College, Sabhal Mòr Ostaig, in Skye in June 2011.
