= John MacInnes (Gaelic scholar) =

John MacInnes (Scottish Gaelic: Iain MacAonghuis, Iain mac Ruairidh mhic Iain mhic Iain mhic Néill mhic Mhaol Mhoire mhic Iain mhic Mhaol Chaluim), 3 April 1930 in Uig, Lewis – 10 May 2019, was a Scottish Gaelic scholar and authority on Scottish Gaelic oral tradition. He was born in Uig, Lewis, but grew up on Raasay, and took an active interest in Gaelic tradition while still young and made a conscious effort to seek it out amongst his family and community.

In 1948, John MacInnes went to study at the University of Edinburgh and was awarded a scholarship in Gaelic established by the Church of Scotland. While an undergraduate, he was a member of the Editorial Committee of Jabberwock, the student-produced review magazine which became one of the major vehicles of the Scottish Literary Renaissance. In 1958, MacInnes was appointed to a Junior Research Fellowship in the School of Scottish Studies and spent years conducting fieldwork amongst Gaelic speakers in Scotland and in Nova Scotia, Canada. He gained his PhD from the University, on the subject of Gaelic poetry, in 1975. MacInnes formally retired from the School of Scottish Studies in 1993.

John MacInnes penned a significant body of seminal articles on aspects of Scottish Gaelic linguistics, folklore, oral narrative, song, dance, history and indigenous beliefs which continue to inform contemporary scholarship. A thorough bibliography and selection of these essays was published as Dùthchas nan Gàidheal. A special issue of the journal Scottish Studies contains biographical information and a range of articles celebrating and extending MacInnes’ intellectual and cultural legacy.

In 2015, John MacInnes was recognised with the 'Services to Gaelic' Award by The Scottish Traditional Music Hall of Fame, and received the award for 'Best Contribution' from the Daily Record and Bòrd na Gàidhlig Scottish Gaelic Awards in the same year.

He was married to Wendy MacInnes (née Dunn) with whom he had two children, Ruairi and Catríona. He has two grandchildren, Sinéad and Roddy.

== Bibliography ==
=== Books ===
- Dùthchas nan Gàidheal: Selected Essays of John MacInnes (2006) (edited by Michael Newton)
