= Iain Crichton Smith =

Scottish writer

Iain Crichton Smith OBE
- Born: 1 January 1928; Glasgow, Scotland
- Died: 15 October 1998 (aged 70); Taynuilt, Argyllshire, Scotland
- Education: University of Aberdeen
- Occupation: Author
- Spouse: Donalda Logan (m. 1977)
- Writing career
- Language: English and Gaelic
- Genre: Short story
- Notable works: Consider the Lilies; "The Telegram"; "The Red Door"

Iain Smith (Gaelic: Iain Mac a' Ghobhainn; 1 January 1928 – 15 October 1998), commonly known under his adopted name Iain Crichton Smith, was a Scottish poet and novelist who wrote in both English and Scottish Gaelic.

== Biography ==
Crichton Smith was born in Glasgow to Christina (née Campbell) and John Smith, who had moved there from the Isle of Lewis for work. There his father died of tuberculosis and in 1930 the family moved back to Lewis, where he and his two brothers were brought up by their mother in the small crofting town of Bayble (which also produced the poets Derick Thomson and Anne Frater). Educated at the University of Aberdeen, Crichton Smith took a degree in English, and, after completing his national service in the Army Educational Corps, went on to become a teacher. He taught in Clydebank, Dumbarton and Oban from 1952, retiring to become a full-time writer in 1977, although he already had many novels and poems published.

== Overview of work ==
Crichton Smith was brought up in a Scottish Gaelic-speaking community, learning English as a second language once he attended school. Friend and poet Edwin Morgan notes that unlike his contemporaries (such as Sorley Maclean and Derick Thomson), Crichton Smith was more prolific in English than in Gaelic, perhaps viewing his writing in what, from Crichton Smith's view, was an imposed non-native language as a challenge to English and American poets. However, Crichton Smith also produced much Gaelic poetry and prose, and also translated some of the work of Maclean from Gaelic to English, as well as some of his own poems originally composed in Gaelic. Much of his English language work is actually directly related to, or translated from, Gaelic equivalents.

Crichton Smith's work also reflects his dislike of dogma and authority, influenced by his upbringing in a close-knit, island Presbyterian community, as well as his political and emotional thoughts and views of Scotland and the Highlands. Despite his upbringing, Crichton Smith was an atheist. A number of his poems explore the subject of the Highland Clearances, and his best-known novel, Consider the Lilies (1968), is an account of the eviction of an elderly woman during such times.

== Bibliography ==
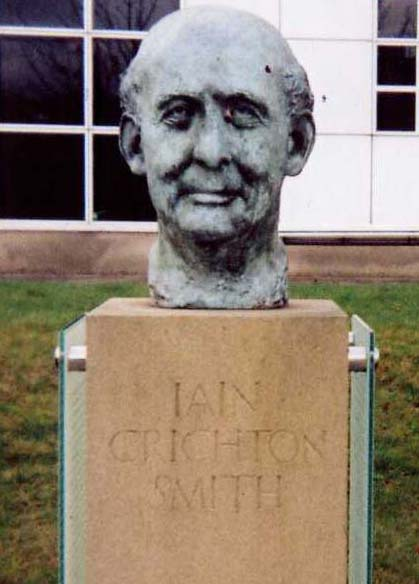
Bust of Crichton Smith at Edinburgh Park

=== Poetry ===
- The Long River (1955)
- Bùrn is Aran (1960)
- Thistles and Roses (1961)
- Deer on the High Hills (1962)
- Bìobuill is Sanasan-Reice (1965)
- The Law and the Grace (1965)
- Modern Gaelic Verse (1966)
- At Helensburgh (1968)
- Ben Dorain by Duncan Ban MacIntyre (1969)
- From Bourgeois Land (1969)
- Selected Poems (Gollancz, 1970)
- Poems to Eimhir translated from Sorley MacLean (1971)
- Love Poems and Elegies (1972)
- Rabhndan is Rudan (1973)
- Eadar Fealla-dha is Glaschu (1974)
- Hamlet in Autumn (1974)
- The Notebooks of Robinson Crusoe (1975)
- The Permanent Island (1975)
- River, River (1978)
- Selected Poems 1955-1980 (Macdonald, 1981)
- Na h-Eilthirich (1983)
- The Exiles (Carcanet Press, 1984)
- Selected Poems (Carcanet, 1985)
- A Life (Carcanet, 1986)
- An t-Eilean agus an Cànan (1987)
- Collected Poems (Carcanet, 1992)
- Ends and Beginnings (Carcanet Press, 1994)
- The Human Face (Carcanet, 1996)
- The Leaf and the Marble (Carcanet, 1998)
- Country For Old Men and My Canadian Uncle (Carcanet, 2000)
- New Collected Poems (Carcanet, 2010)
- Deer on the High Hills: Selected Poems, ed. John Greening (Carcanet, 2021)

=== Novels ===
- Consider the Lilies (1968)
- The Last Summer (1969)
- Iain am Measg Nan Reultan (1970)
- My Last Duchess (1971)
- Goodbye Mr Dixon (1974)
- An t-Aonaran (1976)
- An End to Autumn (1978)
- A Field Full of Folk (1982)
- The Search (1983)
- The Tenement (1985)
- In the Middle of the Wood (1987)
- Na Speuclairean Dubha (1989)
- The Dream (1989)
- Turas tro Shaoghal Falamh (1991)
- An Dannsa mu Dheireadh (1992)
- An Honourable Death (1992)
- Thoughts of Murdo (1993)
- An Rathad gu Somalia (1994)
- Am Miseanaraidh (2006)

=== Short stories ===
- An Dubh is an Gorm (1963)
- Maighstirean is Ministearan (1970)
- Survival Without Error and Other Stories (1970)
- An t-Adhar Ameireaganach (1973)
- The Black and the Red and Other Stories (1973)
- The Village (1976)
- The Hermit and Other Stories (1977)
- Murdo and Other Stories (1981)
- Mr Trill in Hades and Other Stories (1984)
- A' Bheinn Oir (1989)
- Selected Stories (Carcanet, 1990)
- Na Guthan (1991)
- Listen to the Voice: Selected Stories (Canongate, 1993)
- The Red Door: The Complete English Stories 1949-76 (Birlinn, 2001)
- The Black Halo: The Complete English Stories 1977-98 (Birlinn, 2001)
- After the Dance: Selected Stories of Iain Crichton Smith (Polygon, 2013). The 2017 edition added "Home".

=== Non-fiction ===
- The Golden Lyric: An Essay on the Poetry of Hugh MacDiarmid (1967)
- On the Island (1979)
- Towards the Human: Selected Essays (1986)

=== As editor ===
- Twelve More Modern Scottish Poets (with C. King) (1986)
- Moments in the Glasshouse Poetry & Prose by 5 New Scottish Writers (1987)

== Reviews ==
- Relich, Mario (1976), review of The Notebooks of Robinson Crusoe, in Burnett, Ray (ed.), Calgacus 3, Spring 1976, pp. 54 & 55, ISSN 0307-2029
- Craig, David (1980), review of On the Island, in Cencrastus No. 2, Spring 1980, pp. 39 - 41, ISSN 0264-0856
- Lothian, Andrew (1981), review of Murdo and Other Stories, in Cencrastus No. 6, Autumn 1981, p. 41 ISSN 0264-0856
- Craig, Cairns (1983), Crichton Smith: Poetry and Prose, a review of Selected Poems 1955 - 1980 and A Field Full of Folk, in Hearn, Sheila G. (ed.), Cencrastus No. 11, New Year 1983, pp. 44 & 45, ISSN 0264-0856
- Grant, Jamie (1984), review of The Search, in Hearn, Sheila G. (ed.), Cencrastus No. 15, New Year 1984, p. 53, ISSN 0264-0856

== Awards and honours ==
He was made an officer of the Order of the British Empire (OBE) in the 1980 Birthday Honours.
