= George Campbell Hay =

Scottish poet

George Campbell Hay (1915–1984) was a Scottish Symbolist poet and translator, who wrote in Scottish Gaelic, Scots and English. He used the patronymic Deòrsa Mac Iain Dheòrsa. He also wrote poetry in French, Italian and Norwegian, and translated poetry from many languages into Gaelic.

== Life ==
He was born in Elderslie, Renfrewshire, and brought up in Tarbert, Kintyre and Argyll, where his father, the novelist John MacDougall Hay, had been born. He was educated at Fettes College (which he despised) and the University of Oxford. He served in the British Army in North Africa, Italy and Macedonia during World War II, a region which featured in much of his work and then lived for a long period in Edinburgh where he worked in the National Library of Scotland.

He was a Scottish nationalist. His life was difficult, with long periods of hard living, including hospitalisation and homelessness.

== Work ==
He was a multilingual poet and published three collections between 1947 and 1952: Fuaran slèibh (1947), Wind on Loch Fyne (1948) and O na ceithir àirdean (1952). Some of his poetry was set to music by Francis George Scott.

He was a frequent contributor to Gairm magazine, and other Gaelic periodicals. The critic Kurt Wittig suggested Gaelic traits were more evident in his English than his Scots poetry. Mochtàr is Dùghall, an unfinished epic about a Highland soldier, and a North African Arab in World War II was published in 1982.

His Collected Poems and Songs appeared in 2000, edited by Michel Byrne, and has attracted new attention to his work.

== Reviews ==
Burns, John (1983), Terrible Beauty: George Campbell Hay, review of Mochtàr is Dùghall, in Hearn, Sheila G. (ed.), Cencrastus No. 13, Summer 1983, pp. 45 & 46
