= Donald MacAulay =

Poet and Scottish Gaelic scholar

Dòmhnall MacAmhlaigh (21 May 1930 – 28 February 2017) was a Scottish Gaelic poet and professor.

== Early life ==
He was born and raised in a Gaelic-speaking community on Great Bernera, near the Isle of Lewis, and excelled in his secondary studies at the Nicholson Institute. He got first class honours in his degree in Celtic and English at the University of Aberdeen. While MacAmhlaigh did National Service in the Royal Navy between 1955 and 1958, he learned Russian and spent time in Turkey. He married Ella Sangster (of Rothiemay, Moray) in January 1957 and had two children and five grandchildren.

== Academic career ==
He began to work for the university of Edinburgh in 1958, teaching first in English and Linguistics, later the Celtic Studies Department. He also taught at Trinity College, Dublin, at Aberdeen University, and at the Glasgow University where he retired in 1996.

== Style ==
His first book of Gaelic poetry, Seobhrach às a' chlaich ("Primrose out of the rock"), was published in 1967. He edited the landmark collection of twentieth-century Gaelic poetry, Nua-bàrdachd Gàidhlig, which was published in 1977. As with other Scottish Gaelic poets, MacAmhlaigh made English verse translations of his own work. "However, other MacAulay poems remain untranslated and to an extent untranslatable, since, influenced perhaps by e. e. cummings, he was intrigued by the word-play specific to a particular language. Undeterred by readership, his work upholds the integrity of the poet to speak out..."

== Bibliography ==
=== Gaelic ===
- MacAulay, Donald (1967). Seobhrach as a'chlaich (in Scottish Gaelic).
- MacAulay, Donald (1983). Oighreachd agus gabhaltas: iomraidhean air aimhreit an fhearainn anns na h-eileanan (in Scottish Gaelic). Roinn an Fhoghlaim Cheiltich Oilthigh Obar-dheadhan.
- MacAulay, Donald (2008). Deilbh is faileasan: dàin. Acair. ISBN 9780861523511.

=== English ===
- MacAulay, Donald (1977). Modern Scottish Gaelic Poems: Nua-bhàrdachd Ghàidhlig. New Directions Publishing. ISBN 9780811206310.
- MacAulay, Donald; Wilson, George Washington (1984). George Washington Wilson in the Hebrides. Kennedy Bros.(Publishers) Limited. ISBN 9780950790992.
- MacAulay, Donald (1992). The Celtic Languages. Cambridge University Press. ISBN 0-521-23127-2.
