= Derick Thomson =

Scottish poet, publisher, lexicographer, academic and writer (1921–2012)

Derick Smith Thomson (Scottish Gaelic: Ruaraidh MacThòmais; 5 August 1921 – 21 March 2012) was a Scottish poet, publisher, lexicographer, academic and writer. Born at Stornoway on the Isle of Lewis, he spent much of his life in Glasgow where he was Professor of Celtic at the University of Glasgow from 1963 to 1991.

Thomson is best known for being one of the founders of Gairm, the longest-running periodical to be written entirely in Scottish Gaelic, running for over fifty years under his editorship. He was an Honorary President of the Scottish Poetry Library, and a Fellow of the Royal Society of Edinburgh and the British Academy. In June 2007, he received an honorary degree from Glasgow University.

== Life ==
Thomson was originally from Upper Bayble on Lewis, a village that produced two other Gaelic writers of note, Iain Crichton Smith and Anne Frater. His parents, James Thomson and Christina Smith, were both primary school teachers.

Educated at the Nicolson Institute in Stornoway, he went on to the University of Aberdeen, where he studied Celtic and English, the University College of North Wales, Bangor, and Emmanuel College, Cambridge, where he took a second degree in Anglo-Saxon, Norse and Celtic in 1948. He would later teach at the University of Edinburgh, University of Glasgow and University of Aberdeen. He became Professor of Celtic at Glasgow in 1963, and retired in 1991. He was Chairman of the Gaelic Books Council between 1968 and 1991; President of the Scottish Gaelic Texts Society; a member of the Scottish Arts Council; and was the first recipient of the Ossian Prize in 1974. Thomson was Chairman of the Scottish National Party's Gaelic Committee in the 1970s.

Thomson was the author of numerous books, including An Introduction to Gaelic Poetry, The Companion to Gaelic Poetry, European Poetry in Gaelic, and collections of Gaelic poetry, including his collected poems Creachadh na Clàrsaich (English: Plundering of the Celtic harp) which shared the Scottish Book of the Year Award in 1983. He also edited The Companion to Gaelic Scotland. His English–Gaelic dictionary was published in 1981, and was for many years the most practical reference of its kind. He published seven collections of Gaelic poetry, with many English translations, including Meall Garbh/The Rugged Mountain (1995) and Smeur an Dochais.

His publications included seminal works such as the Gaelic Sources of Macpherson's Ossian, An Introduction to Gaelic Poetry, The Companion to Gaelic Scotland, and Gaelic Poetry in the Eighteenth Century. His contributions to Welsh studies are also noteworthy. He worked to promote Scottish Gaelic literature as founder, editor and publisher of the quarterly journal Gairm. He was elected Fellow of the British Academy in 1992 and gave the 1999 Sir John Rhys Memorial Lecture on "Scottish Gaelic Traditional Songs from the 16th to the 18th Century". Thomson was also tireless in his support of other writers in Gaelic and helped bring to publication works such as Gaelic Verbs by Colin Mark.

Thomson died at Glasgow in 2012, at the age of 90.

== Positions held ==
- Honorary President, Scottish Poetry Library
- Professor of Celtic, University of Glasgow – 1963–1991
- Chairman of the Gaelic Books Council
- Fellow of the Royal Society of Edinburgh
- Fellow of the British Academy

== Publications ==
Poetry (own work)

- An Dealbh Briste / The Broken Picture (1951)
- Eadar Samhradh is Foghar / Between Summer and Autumn (1967)
- An Rathad Cian / Far Road (1970) – ISBN 978-0-901771-15-5
- Saora agus an Iolaire / Freedom and the Eagle (1977) – ISBN 978-0-901771-60-5
- Creachadh na Clàrsaich: Collected Poems, 1940–80 (1982) – ISBN 978-0-904265-57-6
- Meall Garbh: Rugged Mountain (1985) – ISBN 978-1-871901-37-5
- Bàrdachd na Roinn Eòrpa an Gàidhlig (1990) – ISBN 978-1-871901-05-4
- Smeur an Dòchais: The Bramble of Hope (1992) – ISBN 978-0-86241-351-4
- Sùil air Fàire (Surveying the Horizon) (2007) – ISBN 978-0-86152-335-1

Poetry (anthologies)

- An Introduction to Gaelic Poetry (1990) – ISBN 978-0-7486-0127-1
- Gaelic Poetry in the Eighteenth Century: A Bilingual Anthology (1993) – ISBN 978-0-948877-19-3
- Alasdair MacMhaighstir Alasdair: Selected Poems (1996) – ISBN 978-1-85500-059-9

Other

- The Gaelic sources of Macpherson's "Ossian" (Aberdeen University studies series;no.130) (1952)
- Branwen Uerch Lyr: The Second of the Four Branches of the Mabinogi (Mediaeval & Modern Welsh) (1961) – ISBN 978-1-85500-059-9
- Gaelic Learner's Handbook (1973) – ISBN 978-0-901771-41-4
- Bith-Eòlas (Biology Textbook) (1976) – ISBN 978-0-901771-53-7
- Gàidhlig ann an Albainn/ Gaelic in Scotland: Bilingual Examination of the Place of Gaelic in Scottish Life (1976) – ISBN 978-0-901771-54-4
- New English-Gaelic Dictionary (1981) – ISBN 978-0-901771-65-0
- Why Gaelic Matters (1984) – ISBN 978-0-85411-028-5
- The Companion to Gaelic Scotland (1987) – ISBN 978-0-631-15578-2
- Languages of Scotland: International Conference Proceedings: Gaelic and Scots in Harmony 2nd, 1988 (1990) – ISBN 978-0-903204-19-4

Co-author

- Edward Lhuyd in the Scottish Highlands (1963) 1699–1700 – ISBN 978-0-19-811929-6
- Future of the Highlands (1968) – ISBN 978-0-7100-6052-5
- Combined Gaelic-English, English-Gaelic Dictionary (1982) – ISBN 978-1-871901-11-5
- Minority Languages Today (1990) – ISBN 978-0-85224-642-9
- MacDiarmid MS Anthology (1992) – ISBN 978-0-7073-0612-4
- Scotland O Gael an Lawlander (1996) – ISBN 978-1-871901-40-5

Recordings

- Nyvaigs (2000) Jennifer Margaret Barker, Composer's Recording Inc./New World Records, CRI862, NWCR862 (recitation of his own poem Geodha Air Chùl Na Grèine)

== Academic articles and lectures available in open access ==
- Black, Ronald. “Sorley MacLean, Derick Thomson, and the Women Most Dangerous to Men,” The Bottle Imp 21: June 2017.
- Dymock, Emma. "The Gaelic Poetry of Derick Thomson," video lecture (Association for Scottish Literary Studies, 2020), YouTube.
- Meek, Donald E. "Appreciation of Professor Derick S. Thomson: funeral oration," Passages from Tiree (blog post).
- Poncarová, Petra Johana. "Derick Thomson and Ireland," Litteraria Pragensia 33:65 (2023).
- Poncarová, Petra Johana. "Derick Thomson and the Ossian Controversy," Anglica 29:3 (2020).
- Poncarová, Petra Johana. "Eadar Canaan is Garrabost (Between Canaan and Garrabost): Religion in Derick Thomson’s Lewis Poetry," Studies in Scottish Literature 46:1 (2020).
