= Maoilios Caimbeul =

British writer

Maoilios Caimbeul (Myles Campbell; born 23 March 1944) is a Scottish writer of poetry, prose and children's literature. He writes in Scottish Gaelic.

Caimbeul, whose forename 'Maoilios' means "servant of Jesus" in Scottish Gaelic, was born in Staffin on the Isle of Skye to a Free Church of Scotland missionary father and spent much of his childhood travelling between the isles of Skye and Lewis.

He joined the Merchant Navy at the age of sixteen and consequently experienced a wide variety of nations and cultures. It was not until he was 26 that he became fully literate in Gaelic (though he had always been a fluent speaker and capable of reading) and at 30 he graduated from the University of Edinburgh and Jordanhill College before embarking upon a career teaching Gaelic. He spent time teaching in Tobermory, Mull and Gairloch.

As well as being a prominent poet, Maoilios is also noted as a writer of prose and children's literature. He has won numerous prizes for his writing and is known for his writing both within Scotland and internationally. He was crowned the Bard at the Royal National Mòd in 2002 and he was the writer in residence at Sabhal Mòr Ostaig for 2008.

== Bibliography ==
Poetry

- Eileanan (1980)
- Bailtean (1987)
- A’ Càradh an Rathaid (1988)
- A’ Gabhail Ris (1994)
- Saoghal Ùr (2002)
- Breac a’ Mhuiltein (2007)
- Dà Thaobh a' Bhealaich (2009)
- Tro Chloich na Sùla (2014)
- An Dà Anam (2016)
- Gràs/Grace (2019)

Fiction

- TEAS (2010)
- Dòrlach Sil (2021)
- Clann a' Phrofeasair (1988)
- Talfasg (1990)
- Mèirlich nam Bradan (1991)
- À Ulbha gu Geelong (1992)
- Iain agus na Drogaichean (1993)
- Murt ann an Diùrainis (1993)
- Caisteal nan Sgràgan (2002)
- An Triùir agus Lùbag (2016)
- Soraidh Slàn le Hallaig(2025)

Biography

- Island Conversion (2011)
