= William Ross (poet) =

Scottish writer (1762–1790/91)

William Ross (Scottish Gaelic: Uilleam Ros [ˈɯ.ʎam ˈros]; 1762–1790/91) was a Scottish writer of Romantic poetry in Scottish Gaelic from the Isle of Skye and a Church of Scotland parish schoolmaster, who is often referred to as "The Bard of Gairloch." Although Ross, similarly to Alasdair Mac Mhaighstir Alasdair, has been referred to as, "the Robbie Burns of the Highlands", he also bears close parallels to his near contemporary John Keats. Similarly to Keats, more than two hundred years after dying of tuberculosis while still in his twenties, Ross remains a highly important and admired figure in Scottish Gaelic literature and is considered one of the greatest poets and writers in the history of the language.

Ross' most famous poems include "Soraidh bhuan do'n t-Suaithneas Bhàn" ("Farewell to the White Cockade"), an iconic eulogy for the 1788 death in exile of Prince Charles Edward Stuart, and the lament, Cuachag nan Craobh ("Cuckoo of the Tree"), one of the many poems inspired by his star crossed love for Lady Marion Ross, the tune of which is now known throughout the Anglosphere as The Skye Boat Song, based on multiple sets of Scottish English lyrics composed a century later. According to Derick S. Thomson, "Ros is justly regarded as the leading poet of love of the eighteenth century." Despite being widely viewed, however, as a, "love-lorn romantic who died of unrequited love", Ross was also very capable of poking fun at his own sorrow. Most recently, 20th-century Gaelic bard and literary critic Sorley MacLean praised Ross's last song, Òran Eile, as one of the greatest poems ever written in any of the languages of Britain and favourably compared it with the best of Shakespeare's sonnets.

== Life ==
Ross was born at Broadford, Isle of Skye, as the son of a travelling peddler. His mother was the daughter of John Mackay, Gaelic poet and bagpiper to the Tacksman of Clan Mackenzie of Gairloch and who, blind from the age of seven due to smallpox, is now known as "The Blind Piper" (Scottish Gaelic: Am Pìobaire Dall). Ross spent some time at Forres, Morayshire, where he gained an education at the local grammar school. Later the family moved to Gairloch in Wester Ross, which was his mother's birthplace.

While travelling as a peddler with his father, Ross learned the many dialects spoken throughout the western Scottish Highlands, which further helped develop his command of the Gaelic language. An accomplished musician, he also sang well and played several musical instruments. He was appointed as both schoolmaster and catechist for the Church of Scotland parish at Gairloch, which was, according to John Lorne Campbell, "a position he occupied with enthusiasm and skill until his death at the age of twenty-eight."

Around 1780, William Ross met Mòr Ros (Lady Marion Ross), a member of the minor Scottish nobility, during a formal ball held at Stornoway, Isle of Lewis. Their "short lived romance", according to Derick S. Thomson, "has become legendary and his finest love poetry (Feasgar Luain, Òran Cumhaidh, and Òran Eile) are concerned with her; their passionate subjectivity is quite unusual in Gaelic verse of the time."

Mòr Ros rejected William Ross's advances and, in 1782, she married an English sailor from Liverpool named Captain Samuel Clough. William Ross was devastated and, according to the oral tradition, prayed for Mrs. Clough to one day experience unrequited love, allegedly with both tragic and unintended consequences. According to the Oxford Dictionary of National Biography, "legend has it that Ross died of love, but if he did it was a lengthy process".

Despite the poet's many versifications of his loss and heartbreak over the marriage of Mòr Ros, he was also capable of poking fun at his own sorrow, as he did in the self-flyting poem Oran eadar am Bàrd agus Cailleach-mhilleadh-nan-dàn ("Exchange of Verses between the Poet and the Hag-who-spoils-poems"). In that poem, we also, according to Derick Thomson, "see [Ross] deflating his own romantic, poetic conceptions about the ideal loved-one."

In his 1783 poem Moladh Gheàrrloch ("In Praise of Gairloch"), William Ross describes the Highland winter sport of shinty, which was traditionally played by the Gaels on St. Andrew's Day, Christmas Day, New Year's Day, Handsel Monday, and Candlemas. The Bard's account of the annual match played upon New Year's Day at ebb tide upon the Big Sand of Gairloch, is, according to Ronald Black, "as succinct a description as we have of the great festive shinty matches of the past."

Ross' last song, Òran Eile, according to Derick Thomson, "is the finest distillation of the poet's love and despair, unsentimental, spare, with much realistic detail and with an underlying passion which shows in the imagery and word craft."

Although still in his twenties, William Ross died of asthma and tuberculosis at Gairloch in either 1790 or 1791. According to legend, on the night of his death, Mrs. Samuel Clough's dress accidentally caught fire from a candle she was holding inside her house in Liverpool, which resulted in her death as well.

== Works ==
William Ross is said to have burned all his manuscripts, but his poems survived as oral poetry and were subsequently collected and transcribed from those who had memorized them.

Two volumes of Ross's Gaelic poems were published—Orain Ghae'lach (Inverness, 1830) and An dara clòbhualadh (Glasgow, 1834), edited by John Mackenzie.

According to John Lorne Campbell, "Although he was well educated in Gaelic, Ross does not seem to have troubled to write down his compositions, of which some seem to have become lost. His poetry possessed a sensitivity and restraint uncommon among Highland bards, and unusual freedom from Anglicisms, but his themes are too often of but trivial interest."

At the same time, his poetic range covered Scotch whisky, chasing girls, and an iconic lament over the death in exile of Prince Charles Edward Stuart in 1788. According to John Lorne Campbell, Ross' Gaelic lament for the Prince, which begins "Soraidh bhuan do'n t-Suaithneas Bhàn", ("Farewell to the White Cockade"), "is at once the Prince's only true elegy and the last genuine Jacobite poem composed in Scotland."

Other iconic 18th-century Gaelic poets, especially Alasdair mac Mhaighstir Alasdair of Lochaber and Iain mac Fhearchair of North Uist, are known to have been major influences.

In the late 19th century, Gaelic poet Fr. Allan MacDonald expressed admiration for William Ross in a diary entry for 22 February 1898: "Took up W. Ross and read pieces. His vocabulary has not so many strange words as Rob Donn's Reay Country Gaelic... He makes you feel with him and for him. Pity for the language that he died so young." Later in the same diary entry, Fr. MacDonald described a conversation with Eriskay postmaster and seanchaidh Dugald MacMillan (Scottish Gaelic: Dùbhgall mac Thormoid), who alleged that the Bard of Gairloch only saw Mòr Ros in a dream and then pined away and died longing in vain to see her again while awake.

During the 20th century, William Ross' poetry was a major influence upon Sorley MacLean, who remains one of the most important figures in Scottish Gaelic literature. MacLean considered William Ross' last song, Òran Eile, "one of the very greatest poems ever made in any language", in the British Isles and comparable to the best of William Shakespeare's 154 sonnets.

== See also ==
- Poetry of Scotland
- Romantic poetry
- Romanticism in Scotland
