= Bean a' Bharra =

Ann Campbell of Barr (fl. 1745) was a Scottish Gaelic language religious poet known as Bean a’ Bharra (English: The Mistress of Barr House).

Campbell was the daughter of Duncan Campbell, a notary public in Lorne. At some point she was the keeper of an inn in Oban called Tigh Clach a’ Gheòidh. She married another Duncan Campbell, a tacksman of Barr in Morvern. She was known for secular compositions before turning to evangelical verse. Of her work, only seven of her religious songs survive.

Her anti-Jacobite song from 1745, no longer extant, prompted attacks on her by the poet Alasdair mac Mhaighstir Alasdair. He derided her as a shameless ("mhì-nàrach") woman who usurped the role of a minister by preaching through her verse. Seven of her laoidhean teagaisg - songs that taught Biblical history and doctrine - were included in Duncan Kennedy’s 1786 collection, Co’-chruinneachadh Laoidhe agus Chantaicibh Spioradail, le Ughdairean Eagsamhail. In Gèillibh do Lagh an Àrd-righ’ ("Yield to the Law of the High King"), she discusses the Old Covenant and the New Covenant, and in Glòir do ’n Lèigh da ’n lèir mo lotaibh’ ("Glory to the Physician who sees my wounds"), sin is an arrow or lancet that pierces her heart.

== Evangelical songs ==
- Gèillibh do Lagh an Àrd-righ
- Ciod as t uaill a dhuine bhorb!
- Thusa ghairm gu h eifeachdach
- Com am bhuil mo theang' na toft
- Glòir do ’n Lèigh da ’n lèir mo lotaibh
- S fhada a codal ort a cholann
- M’ athchuinge ort a Righ an Aigh
