= Iain Mac Fhearchair =

Scottish Gaelic-speaking Bard and seanchaidh

Iain Mac Fhearchair (John MacCodrum) (1693-–1779) was a Scottish Gaelic-speaking Bard and seanchaidh "who lived and died in the island of North Uist." Later in his life, Iain served as Chief Bard to the Chief of Clan MacDonald of Sleat, had a friendship with Alasdair Mac Mhaighstir Alasdair, and made an appearance in the Ossianic controversy surrounding the poet James Macpherson.

== Life ==
According to his song Smeòrach Chlann Dòmhnaill ("The Song Thrush of Clan Donald"), Iain Mac Fhearchair, alias John MacCodrum, was born near Cladh Chomhgain, which is, according to Bill Lawson, "a disused graveyard in which were the ruins of a little chapel, dedicated to St Comgan - one of many church dedications in the immediate neighbourhood. In MacCodrum's time, it would have been part of the township of Hoghagearraidh." The future Bard was raised on the nearby farm of Aird an Runair.

According to John Lorne Campbell, Iain, "was in the technical sense of the term, illiterate." In a footnote, however, Campbell explains, "Which is to say that he never learned English. In MacCodrum's day little education was available for the Highlanders, and none at all in their own language."

During the era, the people of Hoghagearaidh paid the Chief of Clan MacDonald of Sleat a rental fee called "The Seal Dues", in return for the right to kill the seals on the nearby rock of Causamul. The rock remains, according to Bill Lawson, "one of the main breeding areas for the Atlantic seal."

The MacCodrums of Hoghagearaidh, however, never participated in the killing of seals. This was because, according to legend, an ancestor of theirs had stolen the skin of a selkie while she was ashore in human form and forced her to marry him. As told in a local folk song, however, one of the couple's children later returned the seal skin to her mother, who put it on, abandoned her human family, and returned to the sea. For this reason, the MacCodrum descendants of the couple were referred to in Scottish Gaelic as, Clann righ fo gheasan, ("King's children under a spell") and never harmed seals, whom they believed to be their relatives.

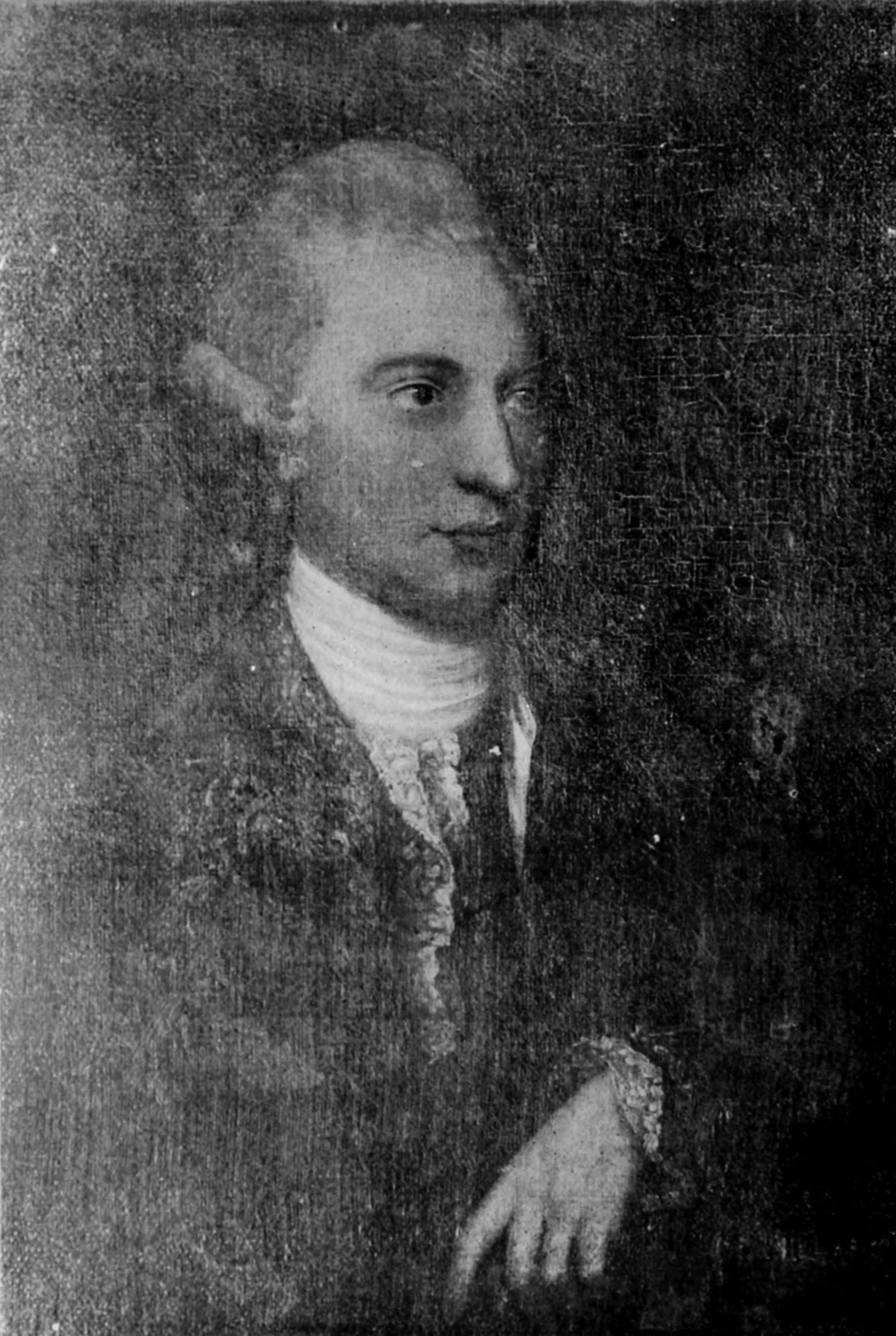
MacCodrum 's patron, Sir Alexander Macdonald of Sleat, 7th Baronet

Although Sir Alexander MacDonald of Sleat had promised Prince Charles Edward Stuart that he would do raise the Clan if the Prince arrived from France, the Chief and his Clansmen took no part in the Jacobite Uprising of 1745. The Chief's reason for going back on his word was that the French troops that had also been promised had failed to arrive with the Prince. Despite the Clan's neutrality, all the lands of MacDonald of Sleat were included in the savage repression of Highland dress, language, and culture that followed the defeat of the uprising at the Battle of Culloden in 1746. John MacCodrum's satirical poem, Oran an Aghaidh an Eididh Ghallda ("A Song Against the Lowland Garb"), "shows clearly where his own sympathies lay."

In 1760, James Macpherson, who was collecting stories from the Fenian Cycle throughout the Scottish Highlands and Islands, visited North Uist. During Macpherson's visit, MacCodrum made, according to John Lorne Campbell, "a brief appearance in the Ossianic controversy which is not without its humorous side." When Macpherson met MacCodrum, he asked the Bard, "A bheil dad agaibh air an Fheinne?" Macpherson believed himself to be asking, "Do you know anything of the Fianna?" He had actually said, however, "Do the Fianna owe you anything?"

In reply, MacCodrum quipped, "Cha n-eil agus ge do bhiodh cha ruiginn a leas iarraidh a nis", "No, and if they did it would be useless to ask for it now." According to Campbell, this, "dialogue... illustrates at once Macpherson's imperfect Gaelic and MacCodrum's quickness of reply."

In October 1763, as the controversy over the authenticity of Macpherson's epic poem Ossian, which he alleged was a translation from Scottish Gaelic, was heating up, Sir James MacDonald of Sleat wrote a letter to Doctor Hugh Blair in Edinburgh which sheds light on MacCodrum's role as a seanchaidh.

According to The MacDonald of Sleat, "The few bards that are left amongst us, repeat only detached portions of these poems. I have often heard and understood them, particularly from one man called John MacCodrum, who lives on my estate in North Uist. I have heard him repeat, for hours together, poems which seems to me to be the same with Macpherson's translation."

Campbell writes, however, "None of MacCodrum's Ossianic verses have survived him.

One of MacCodrum's closest friends was the famous Gaelic poet Alasdair mac Mhaighstir Alasdair, who was related to the Chief of the Clanranald branch of Clan Donald. According to John Lorne Campbell, MacCodrum's surviving poems in Gaelic "show considerable signs" of the Clanranald Bard's "influence." Despite their friendship, however, Alasdair Mac Mhaighstir Alasdair did not hesitate to include two of MacCodrum's poems, Òran air Sean aois ("A Song on Old Age") and Comh-radh, Mar go b' ann eider caraid agus namhaid an Uisgebheatha ("A Dialogue between a Friend and a Foe of Whisky"), in his groundbreaking 1751 poetry collection Ais-Eiridh na Sean Chánoin Albannaich and to pass them off as his own work.

MacCodrum also composed poetry criticizing both the Scottish clan chiefs and the Anglo-Scottish landlords of the Highlands and Islands for the often brutal mass evictions of the Scottish Gaels that followed the Battle of Culloden and on mundane topics such as old age and whisky.

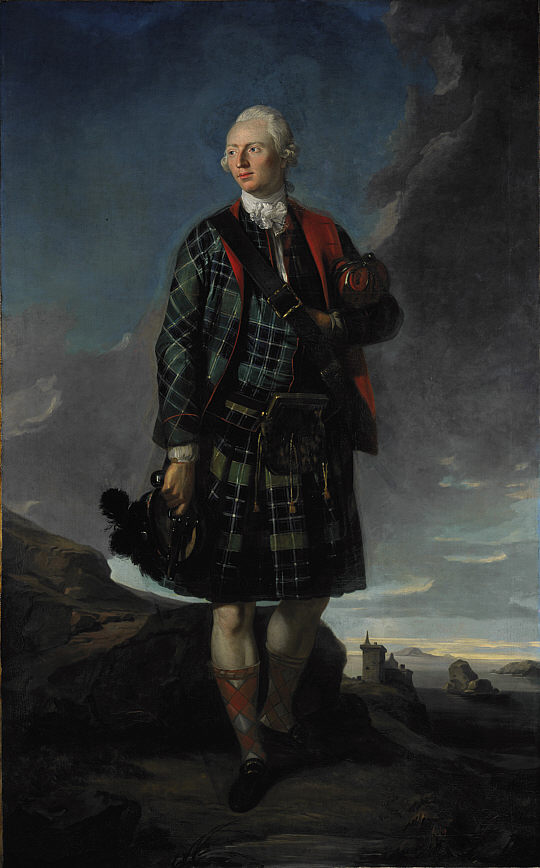
Sir Alexander Macdonald, 9th Baronet of Sleat and 1st Baron Macdonald of Slate, who remains infamous for raising rents and ordering mass estate clearances of his clansmen.

Among MacCodrum's most popular anti-landlord poems mocks Aonghus MacDhòmhnaill, the post-Culloden tacksman of Griminish. It is believed to date from between 1769 and 1773, when overwhelming numbers of Sir Alexander MacDonald's tenants on the isles of North Uist and Skye were reacting to his rackrenting and other harsh treatments by immigrating to the area around the Cape Fear River in North Carolina. The song is known in the oral tradition of North Uist as Òran Fir Ghriminis ("A Song on the Tacksman of Griminish"). The song is equally popular among speakers of Canadian Gaelic in Nova Scotia, where it is known under the differing title, Òran Aimereaga ("The Song of America").

== Death and burial ==
According to Bill Lawson, John MacCodrum lies buried near his birthplace in Kilmuir cemetery, " under a plain lump of granite which had chosen for himself. When asked why he had picked such a stone, he replied that people would ask who lay under such an ugly lump of rock, and so he would be remembered. Unfortunately he was wrong, and I could find no one to show me the original stone - if indeed it is still there. An obelisk to his memory was later raised on the summit of the knoll, with the inscription, In memory of John MacCodrum - The Uist Bard - Born at Aird an Runair 1710 - died 1796 - erected by numerous admirers 1894. Unfortunately, the dates are badly wrong. MacCodrum did die at the age of 86, but it has been established, from the Balranald Papers, where MacCodrum's funeral expenses are noted, that his date of death actually 1779, and his date of birth therefore 1693."

Following his death in 1967, Scottish Gaelic war poet and fellow North Uist native Dòmhnall Ruadh Chorùna was buried in the same cemetery.

== Legacy ==
According to John Lorne Campbell, "MacCodrum in his lifetime enjoyed considerable popularity as a wit and a poet, and he composed a large number of poems, consisting of satires or rather lampoons, elegies, patriotic verse, and didactic songs; but as he was unable to write, and no one took down his poems from his own recitation, many of them have been lost, and those surviving have all suffered some degree of corruption."

One of Iain's most popular songs is Smeòrach Chlann Dòmhnaill ("The Mavis of Clan Donald"), in which the Bard, according to Bill Lawson, "praises the isle of his birth." The song was recorded by Scottish vocalist and fellow North Uist native Julie Fowlis on her 2014 album Gach sgeul - Every story.

Due to both the Highland Clearances and to voluntary emigration, there are no longer any MacCodrum descendants living on North Uist. The last MacCodrum to leave the island was Dòmhnall mhic Aoidh mhic Mhurchaidh mhic Iomhair mhic Iain mhic Iomhair, whose great-grandfather was the first cousin of the Bard. Donald, a former farm worker in Paiblesgarry, left North Uist, first for the nearby island of Barra, and then for the Mira River valley in Cape Breton, Nova Scotia, Canada, during the 1820s.
