= John Mackay (poet) =

Scottish Gaelic poet and composer

John Mackay (Scottish Gaelic: Iain (Dall) MacAoidh; 1656–1754), known as Am Pìobaire Dall (The Blind Piper), was a Scottish Gaelic poet and composer, and the grandfather of William Ross.
