= Cath Finntrágha =

Early Modern Irish prose narrative

- "The Battle of Ventry"
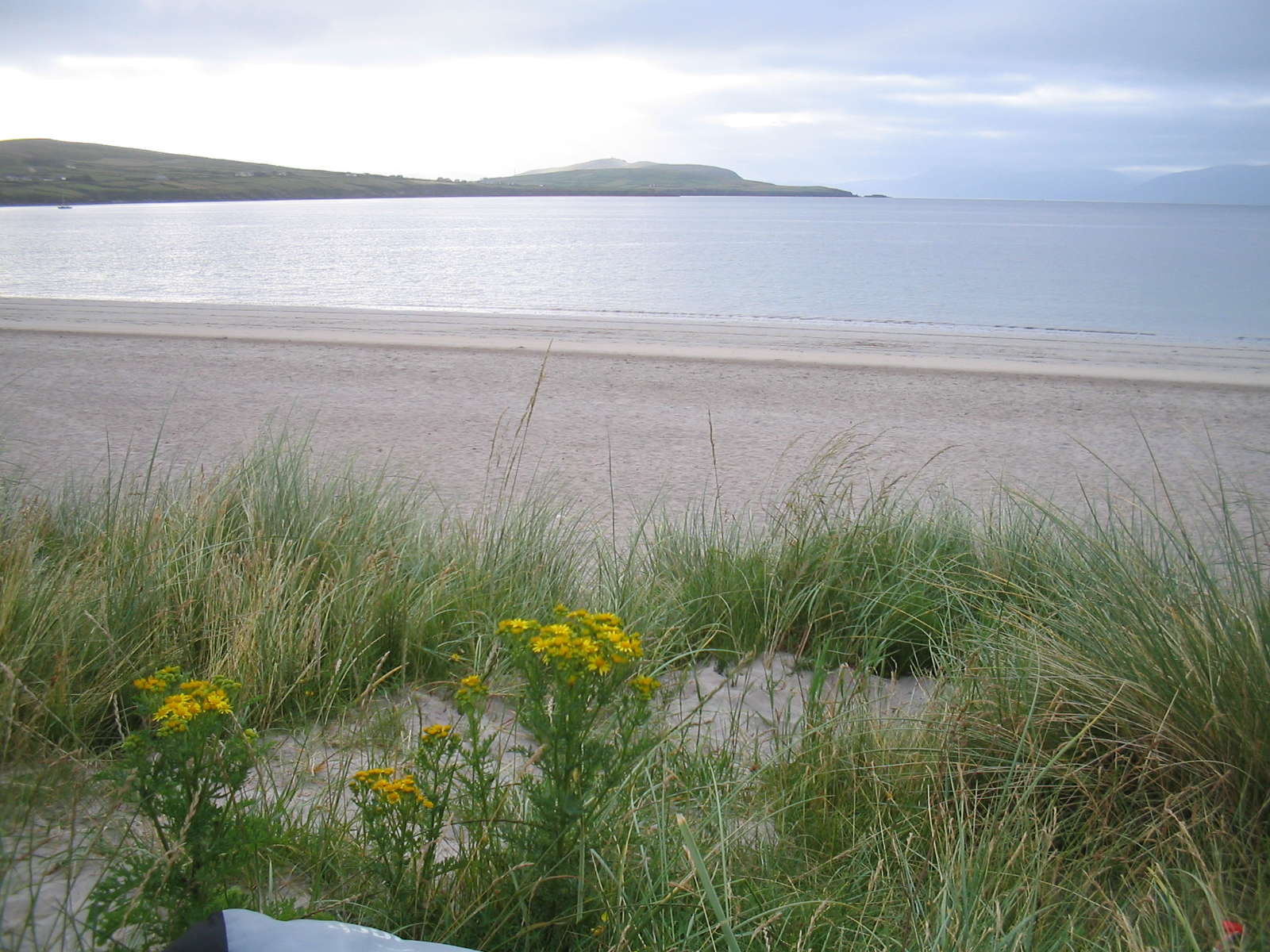
- The beach of Ventry
- Author(s): Finnlaech Ó Cathasaigh of Tirawley (County Mayo)
- Dedicated to: Sadbh Ní Mháille
- Language: Early Modern Irish
- Date: 15th century
- Manuscript(s): • Oxford, Bodleian, MS Rawlinson B. 487. • Dublin, RIA, MS 29 (olim 23 L 24).
- Genre: prose narrative of the Finn Cycle, with elements of the Ulster Cycle and Mythological Cycle
- Subject: defence of Ireland against foreign invasion
- Setting: mainly Finntraighe (Ventry, County Kerry)
- Personages: Finn mac Cumaill; invaders: Dáire Donn, King Bolcán of France, Ógarmach, etc.; helpers: Tuatha Dé Danann

Cath Finntrágha (Note: Alternative spellings include Cath Finntrága (Meyer) and Cath Fionntrágha.) (Scottish Gaelic: Cath Fionntràgha) (The Battle of Ventry (Note: Alternative English titles include The Battle of Ventry / Ventry Harbour/ Ventry Strand / the White Strand.)) is an Early Modern Irish prose narrative of the Finn Cycle of Irish mythology. It dates probably to the 15th century in its current form, but apparently relied on older material. It concerns the deeds of the warrior-hero Fionn mac Cumhaill, his fianna, and, eventually, the gods and goddesses of Irish myth as they defend Ireland against a foreign invasion led by the world-king Dáire Donn. According to Derick Thomson, an 18th-century manuscript of the story in the Scottish Gaelic language also survives in the hand of iconic Scottish war poet Alasdair Mac Mhaighstir Alasdair.

== Synopsis ==
Dáire (or Dáiri) Donn, called "king of the great world" and ostensibly the most powerful ruler in Europe, intends to invade Ireland. Apart from seeking to gratify a more general ambition to conquer territory, he has a pretext and motif which are directed at Finn mac Cumaill in person. First of all, Dáire seeks retribution for the fact that Finn has eloped with the wife and daughter of Bolcán (Vulcan), King of France, when in the mercenary service of the latter. Second, Dáire's sense of honour and pride is ignited by stories about Finn's successes. He musters a large body of forces from all across Europe and invades Ireland at Finntraighe (lit. 'fair strand'), the shore of Ventry (County Kerry), on the Dingle Peninsula. A mighty and protracted battle ensues. Finn's son Oisín faces Bolcán in combat, who much like Suibne Geilt, goes insane and flies off, ultimately landing at Glenn Bolcáin. The young son of the King of Ulster arrives with a troop of boys to rally to Finn's support but is killed. It is only when the Tuatha Dé Danann are called upon and, after considerable internal debate, choose to intervene, that the Fianna are at last victorious. When Finn personally slays both Dáire Donn and the Greek amazon Ógarmach, the invaders finally admit defeat and take flight.

== Manuscripts and textual history ==
The text in its present form was probably written in the 15th century and is represented by two vellum manuscripts: (1) Oxford, Bodleian Library, MS Rawlinson B. 487, 1–11, and (2) Dublin, Royal Irish Academy, MS 29 (olim 23 L 24), 328–337, 355–361. In a note to Rawlinson B. 487, the scribe Finnlaech Ó Cathasaigh of Tirawley (County Mayo) declares to have composed the tale for Sadbh Ní Mháille (daughter of Tadg Ó Maille), wife of Richard MacWilliam Bourke (d. 1479).

Earlier allusions to Finn's battle at Ventry suggest that one or several versions of the story were current as early as the 12th century. The event is first referred to in a love-story of the Acallam na Senórach, in which Finn sets out to meet the enemy in battle, but interrupts the journey to act as a match-maker for Cáel and Créde. During the seventeen days of the battle, the couple offer assistance to Finn, but on the last day, Cáel drowns at sea in pursuit of an opponent and Créde dies of grief. The story is also told in the 15th-century Cath Finntrágha, but this appears to offer a thoroughly revised tale, which incorporates miscellaneous narrative material from the Finn Cycle, the Ulster Cycle and the Mythological Cycle. It has been argued that much of its framework was suggested by the earlier tale Cath Trága Rudraigi (The Battle of Dundrum Bay), in which Norsemen forces invade Ireland and do battle at Dundrum Bay (County Down).

=== Editions ===
The text was edited and translated by Kuno Meyer (1885) from the vellum manuscript Bodleian Library, Rawlinson B 487, with variants from Egerton 149. Cecil O'Rahilly later published and edition and translation, also from Ms. Rawlinson B 487.

== Antiquarian commentary ==
John O'Donovan provides a number of interesting insights into the Battle of Ventry in his Ordnance Survey letters of 1841. He noted several burial carns near Cantraw, presumed evidence of a great slaughter, along with local claims of finds of many bones and skulls at the east end of the strand. He also noted a boggy area known for the slaughter of the mighty men, Guin na dTreanfhear.

== Popular culture ==
The Novel 'Storm Shield' by Kenneth C. Flint is based on the characters and events of the Battle of Ventry.

== See also ==
- Dáire Doimthech
