= Dalelia =

Coordinates: 56.76099°N 5.70408°W

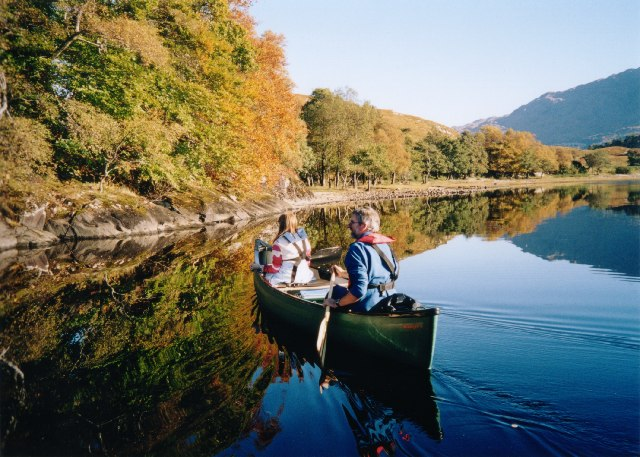
- Loch Shiel at Dalelia taken from the pier at looking southeast.

- Location within the Lochaber area
- OS grid reference: NM736693
- Council area: Highland
- Country: Scotland
- Sovereign state: United Kingdom
- Post town: Acharacle
- Postcode district: PH36 4
- Police: Scotland
- Fire: Scottish
- Ambulance: Scottish

Dalelia or Dalilea (from Scottish Gaelic: Dàil Eileadh [t̪aːl ˈeləɣ]) is hamlet on the north shore of Loch Shiel in Acharacle district of Argyll, Scottish Highlands and is in the Scottish council area of Highland. Kinlochmoidart is to the north. The alternate Gaelic name "Dàil an Leigh" has been suggested but this is believed to be a folk etymology for Dàil Eileadh.

== History ==
Dalelia is perhaps most famous as the birthplace of the renowned 18th-century Gaelic poet Alasdair mac Mhaighstir Alasdair. Born at Dalilea in about 1700, his father, Maighstir Alasdair MacDhòmhnaill (Rev. Dr. Alexander MacDonald, 1st of Dalilea), was the Non-Juring Episcopalian Rector of Kilchoan and held the tack of Dalelia.

After his death c.1724, Maighstir Alasdair MacDhòmhnaill was succeeded as tacksman by his eldest son, Aonghas Beag MacDhòmhnaill (Angus MacDonald, 2nd of Dalelia). After Aonghas converted from the Scottish Episcopal Church to Roman Catholicism, he served as captain over the men of Dalelia during the Jacobite Rising of 1745. Like his younger brother, Aonghas Beag survived the Battle of Culloden in 1746.

The brothers' birthplace at Dalilea was plundered by Hanoverian troops. Despite this, Aonghas Beag returned to his native district, where he had to remain in hiding for two years and only rarely dared to visit his family. After the act of indemnity was passed, he returned to Dalelia, where he finished his days in peace.

After more than 800 years of ownership by the line of Somerled, Dalilea House and the surrounding district, along with the estates of Lochans, Eilean Seòna, and the Isle of Muck, were sold in 1813, both to cover the debts and to fund the extremely extravagant spending of Ranald George Macdonald, 19th Chief of Clanranald.

Today, Dalilea is a working farm with self-catered accommodation for tourists and boats for hire.
