= Alasdair mac Mhaighstir Alasdair =

Scottish poet, lexicographer, political writer and memoirist

Alasdair mac Mhaighstir Alasdair (c. 1698–1770), legal name Alexander MacDonald, or, in Gaelic Alasdair MacDhòmhnaill, was a Scottish poet, satirist, lexicographer, and memoirist.

He was born at Dalilea and is believed to have been homeschooled before briefly attending university. MacDhòmhnaill was multilingual literacy in the vernacular Scottish Gaelic language. Alasdair began composing Gaelic poetry while teaching at a Protestant school at Kilchoan, run by the Society in Scotland for Propagating Christian Knowledge. He published the first secular book in Scottish Gaelic, the glossary Leabhar a Theagasc Ainminnin (1741). Hearing Alasdair 's Jacobite poetry read aloud was said to have helped persuade Prince Charles Edward Stuart to sail from France to Scotland and begin the Rising of 1745. Alasdair fought as a captain in the Jacobite Army. He was chosen to teach Gaelic to the prince. After the Battle of Culloden, Alasdair, his wife, and children remained in hiding until the Act of Indemnity was passed in 1747.

In 1751, Alasdair published the second secular book in the Gaelic language, Ais-Eiridh na Sean Chánoin Albannaich (The Resurrection of the Old Scottish Language); a poetry collection. Due to his Jacobitism, frank treatment of sexuality, and vocal attacks in verse against the House of Hanover and the ideology of the ruling Whig political party, all known copies were publicly burned at the Mercat Cross in Edinburgh. Even so, twelve copies of the first edition still survive. The 1751 publication of Ais-eridh na Sean Chánoin Albannaich inspired, "an increasing number of important collections of Gaelic poetry." After another two decades of composing Gaelic poetry, Alasdair Mac Mhaighstir Alasdair died at Arisaig and was buried locally in St Máel Ruba's Roman Catholic cemetery in 1770.

Alsasdair has been mentioned as one of Scotland's national poets and even as a complimentary figure to Robert Burns. After over two centuries of bowdlerisation, the first complete and uncensored collection of Alasdair's poetry was published at West Montrose, Ontario in 2020. Ballachulish-based vocalist Griogair Labhruidh has also recorded Alasdair's Òran Eile don Phrionnsa ("Another Song to the Prince"), titled by its first line Moch sa Mhadainn 's Mi a' Dùsgadh, as part of the soundtrack for the 2nd and 4th seasons of the TV series Outlander.

== Family background ==
Alasdair mac Mhaighstir Alasdair was born around 1698, into both the Scottish nobility and Clan MacDonald of Clanranald. Through his great-grandmother Màiri, daughter of Angus MacDonald of Islay, he claimed descent from Scottish Kings Robert the Bruce and Robert II, the first monarch of the House of Stuart, as well as, like the rest of Clan Donald, from Somerled. Alasdair's father, Maighstir Alasdair MacDhòmhnaill, was a native of South Uist and was the fourth son of Ronald MacDonald, the tacksman of Milton. Through his oldest brother, Ranald MacDonald, who succeeded their father as tacksman of Milton and Balivanich, Maighstir Alasdair was the uncle of Flora MacDonald. He was also distantly related to The Captain of Clanranald (Scottish Gaelic: Mac Mhic Ailein). He graduated from the University of Glasgow in 1674 and shortly afterwards was assigned as a rector to the parish in Ardnamurchan. The poet's mother was a Maclachlan from Glencripesdale and the two came to reside at Dalilea at about the end of the 17th century. Maighstir Alasdair is said to have died in the 1720s. He lies buried next to his wife on Finnan's Island in Loch Shiel, on the south side of the ruined chapel, underneath a gravestone on which a skeleton has been carved.

== Early life ==
Alasdair mac Mhaighstir Alasdair, was born at Dalilea at the beginning of the 18th century. The old part of Dalilea House, which is believed to date from the 15th century and where Alasdair was born, is still extant. So, in fact, is an oak which Alasdair is said to have planted in his youth. There were no schools in the area and so it is thought that the younger Alasdair was educated by his father throughout his early years. However, bishop Robert Forbes later wrote of Alasdair, "He is a very smart, acute man, remarkably well skilled in the Erse, for he can both read and write the Irish language in its original character, a piece of knowledge almost quite lost in the Highlands of Scotland, there being exceedingly few that have any skill at all in that way. For the Captain told me that he did not know another person (old Clanranald excepted) that knew anything of the first tongue in its original character... Several of the Captain's acquaintances have told me that he is by far the best Erse poet in all Scotland, and that he has written many songs in the pure Irish." Even though he would have been only a teenager at the time, according to Derrick S. Thomson, "from one or two references there it could be thought that he", had also taken part in the Jacobite rising of 1715.

Alasdair followed in the footsteps of his father and attended the University of Glasgow, and the University of Edinburgh, at a time when Scottish songs were gaining huge popularity. He is said to have left without receiving a degree. He is known, however, to have later set several of his poems to the airs played upon the steeple of the Glasgow Tolbooth, near the Old College. Derick Thomson suggests that his departure may have been due to his having married Jane MacDonald of Dalness (Sine Nic Dhòmhnaill). Derick S. Thomson writes that Jane's family, the MacDonalds of Dalness, "had strong literary interests". Her father had composed a verse dialogue between Queen Anne and the Chief of Clan Stewart of Appin. Furthermore, the Gaelic song Tha mise seo 'm laighe is attributed to Jane's brother. Alasdair later wrote the poem Òran d'a chéile nuadh-phósda in praise of his bride and referred to his father in law as, "The Rhymer". Another account states that Alasdair left the university because his family could not afford the price of attending. However, according to John Lorne Campbell, "In any case, Glasgow University has no record of Alexander MacDonald, son of 'Maighstir Alasdair', as a student." Alasdair was described as a fine singer, of tall height and broad chest, handsome in feature and fair in hair. Among his attributes were sincerity, honesty, loyalty to his friends and to his own convictions.

== Protestant missioner ==
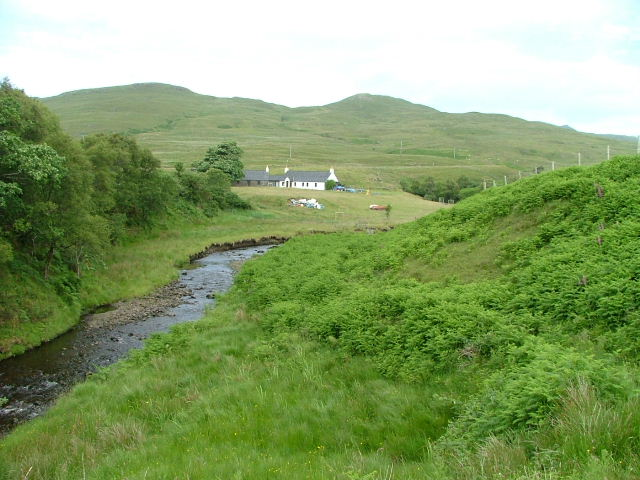
Allt Coire Mhuilinn, near Kilchoan, where Alasdair MacDhòmhnaill both farmed and lived with his family while working as a schoolmaster.

In 1729, Alasdair was appointed to a school at Finnan Island, at the head of Loch Shiel and only a few miles from Alasdair's ancestral home at Dalilea, as a teacher by the Society in Scotland for Propagating Christian Knowledge (SPCK). He was the catechist of the same parish under the Royal Bounty Committee of the Church of Scotland; his position required him to teach at various locations throughout Moidart. From 1738 to 1744, Alasdair MacDhòmhnaill taught at the school attached to his father's former parish church at Kilchoan. He also supplemented his salary of £16 a year by renting the farm at Allt Coire Mhuilinn, about which he later composed one of his most famous poems: Allt an t-Siùcar (The Sugar Brook), which remains, according to Scottish nationalist literary scholar Cailean Gallagher, "a favourite at Mòds and ceilidhs to this day."

In 1741, Alasdair compiled a 200-page Gaelic-English vocabulary at the request of the Society, which published it with a dedication to the Marquess of Lothian. As source material and a model for his spelling, Alasdair used the existing Irish language translations of the "Confession of Faith", the Westminster Shorter Catechism, and the Book of Common Prayer. In his dedication to the volume, Alasdair wrote, "It seems to have been reserved for you to be the happy instruments of bringing about the Reformation of the Highlands and Islands of Scotland, diverse places of which are remote from the means of obtaining instruction; and indeed when we consider the situation of the inhabitants, their ignorance, their inclinations to follow the customs, fashions, and superstitions of their forefathers, the number of Popish Emissaries in many places of these countries; and add to that their way of life, the unfrequented passes and the distance of their houses from one another, one would not think, but that an attempt to reform them would be a very arduous task to be brought about, even by the most desirable means." The writer Alan Riach expressed the belief that compiling the first Gaelic dictionary convinced Alasdair mac Mhaighstir Alasdair that the Gaelic language deserved preservation and that this new belief caused him to turn against the S.S.P.K. and everything it stood for.

According to Campbell, "Meanwhile, MacDonald's official salary as an SPCK schoolmaster and catechist has been reduced from £18 to £15 in 1738, to £14 in 1740, and to £12 in 1743." Even so, there was a proposal in 1742 to send him as a Protestant missionary to the overwhelmingly Catholic island of South Uist. Alasdair MacDhòmhnaill's whereabouts during the year of 1744, however, are unknown. The SSPK believed him to have "deserted his post to help rally the Jacobite clans" and their suspicions are confirmed by the flyting poem to "the Mull Satirist". In the same minute, the SSPK criticized Alasdair MacDhòmhnaill for assigning his sixteen-year-old son Raonuill Dubh MacDhòmhnaill to cover his teaching duties. The Synod'slater investigated Alasdair for his actions and he was summoned to Edinburgh by the Royal Bounty Committee to answer the charge that he was composing erotic poetry in Gaelic. He ignored the summons. The SSPK finally dismissed Alasdair, who they were told had again abandoned his teaching duties at Coire Mhuilinn, in a minute dated 4 July 1745. In reality, on 15 May 1745, according to historian John Watts, Alasdair MacDonald had already preempted his dismissal by resigning his post. At the time, like many other Gaels, whether Protestant or Catholic, he was anxiously awaiting the arrival of Prince Charles Edward Stuart.

== Conversion to Catholicism ==
Like his brother Aonghas Beag, Alasdair converted during this period from Protestantism to the then illegal and underground Catholic Church in Scotland. According to Charles MacDonald, who interviewed Alasdair's surviving relatives in the late 19th century, his conversion was due to the example and influence of Margaret Cameron MacDonald, his devoutly Roman Catholic sister-in-law. Historian John Watts, however, believes that their close kinsman from Morar, Bishop Hugh MacDonald, the underground Catholic Vicar General of the Highland District, also played a highly significant role in the conversions of Aonghas Beag and Alasdair MacDonald. Although the exact date of the Alasdair's reception into the Catholic Church remains unknown, Watts believes that he was received in secret, in order to safeguard his job, at least by 1744, when suspicion of his religious sympathies began to cause problems related to his employment as a Church of Scotland schoolmaster and catechist. On the suspension of a Catholic colleague, Alasdair later wrote a report titled, "Reasons for Laying on and continuing Mr Francis McDonnells suspension, and why they are published", survives in the Scottish Mission Papers, Scottish Catholic Archives.

== Jacobite officer and war poet ==
Jacobite Standard of the 1745 Uprising.

Jacobite songs penned by Alasdair such as: Òran Nuadh — "A New Song", Òran nam Fineachan Gaidhealach — "The Song of the Highland Clans" and Òran do'n Phrionnsa — "A Song to the Prince," emphasise the Jacobite cause and for the reforms promised by "The King over the Water." According to literary historian John MacKenzie, these poems were sent to Aeneas MacDonald, the brother of the Clanranald tacksman of Kinlochmoidart, who was a banker in Paris. Aeneas read the poems aloud to Prince Charles Edward Stuart in English translation and the poems played a major role in convincing the Prince to come to Scotland and to initiate the Jacobite Rising of 1745. Furthermore, as Charles MacDonald wrote during the 1880s, the Jacobite war poems of Alasdair, "are sung at almost every fireside in the Jacobite districts to this day."

On 25 July 1745, the Prince arrived at Loch nan Uamh from Eriskay aboard the French privateer Du Teillay. Alasdair was one of the first to go aboard. According to Bishop Robert Forbes, "He did not then know that the Prince was among the passengers, who being in very plain dress, Captain MacDonald made up to him without any manner of ceremony, and conversed with him in a very familiar way, sitting close by the Prince and drinking a glass with him, till one of the name of MacDonald made him such a look that immediately he began to suspect he was using too much freedom with one above his own rank. Upon this he soon withdrew, but was still in the dark about what particular person the young gentleman he had been conversing with might be." On 19 August 1745, Alasdair MacDhòmhnaill is believed to have witnessed as the Prince's Standard was unfurled by the Marquess of Tullibardine, blessed and raised at Glenfinnan (Scottish Gaelic: Gleann Fhionnain), which signalled the beginning of the Jacobite rising of 1745. Alasdair is also said on this occasion to have personally sung his song of welcome: Teàrlach Mac Sheumais. Afterwards he became the "Tyrtaeus of the Highland Army" and "the most persuasive of recruiting sergeants".

Alasdair's name appears upon a "Roll of Men upon Clanranald's Mainland Estates, with their arms, made up in 1745", with a gun and pistol. His first commission was as a captain in the Clan Ranald Regiment where he was placed in command of 50 "cliver fellows" whom he personally recruited in Ardnamurchan. Among his other responsibilities, Alasdair was appointed to teach Scottish Gaelic to the Prince due to his "skill in the Highland Language." Alasdair mac Mhaighstir Alasdair fought alongside the Clanranald men for the duration of the campaign which ended with the crushing defeat and the no quarter given to the Jacobite Army at the Battle of Culloden.

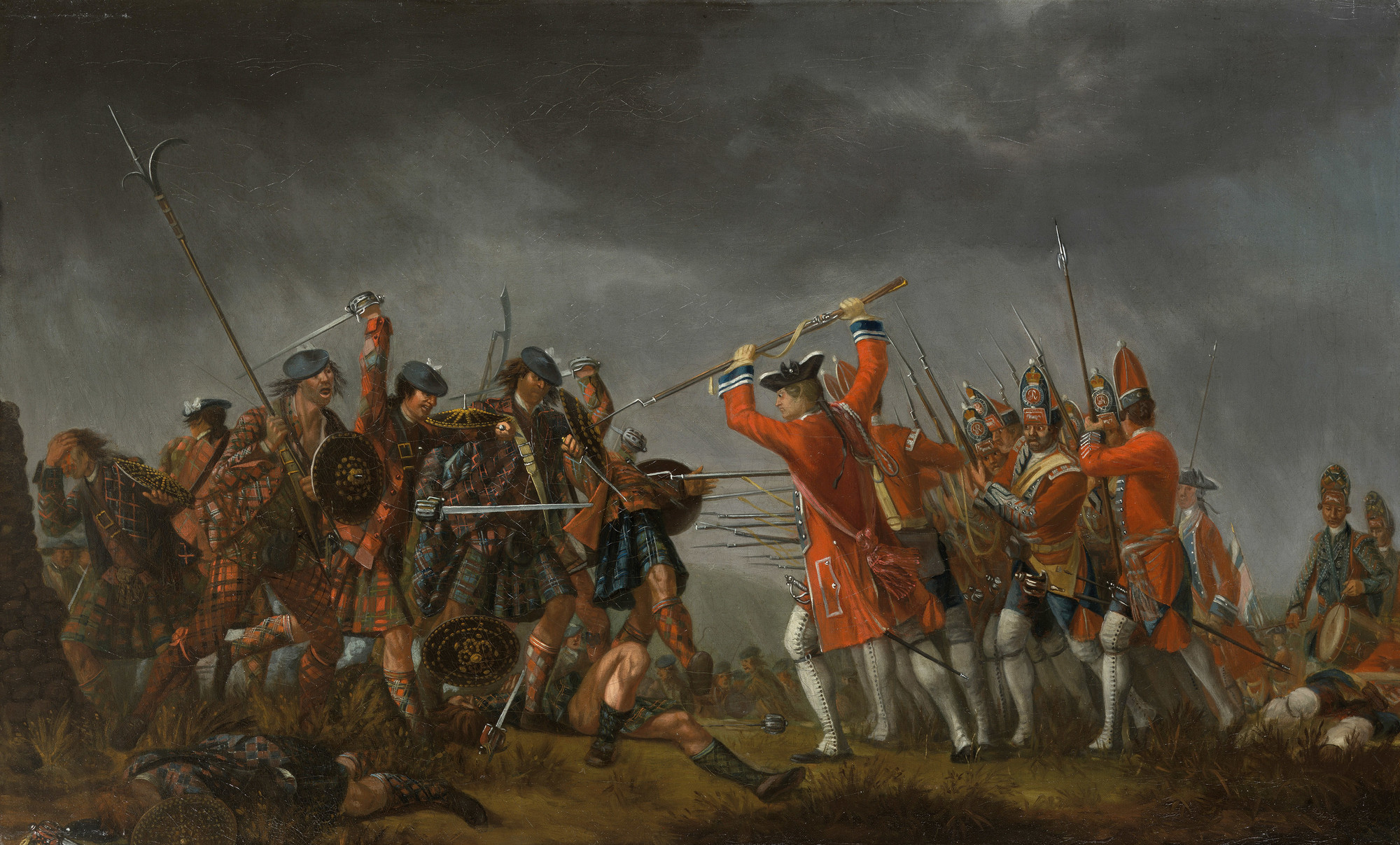
David Morier's depiction of the 1745 Battle of Culloden – An Incident in the Rebellion of 1745

== Aftermath of Culloden ==
In the aftermath of the Battle of Culloden, it is believed that Alasdair remained with the Prince for at least part of the latter's flight, about which he later helped write a detailed account. John Lorne Campbell believes that he may have been one of the survivors of the Clanranald Regiment who joined the Prince at Glenbiastill in Arisaig (Scottish Gaelic: Àrasaig), four or five days after the disaster of Culloden. After the Prince escaped to France, both Alasdair and his elder brother Aonghas Beag were fugitives in their own country; both Alasdair's house and his brother's mansion at Dalilea were plundered by Hanoverian redcoats.

Bishop Robert Forbes first met and interviewed "Captain Alexander MacDonald, brother german of Æneas or Angus MacDonald of Dalely (sic) in Moidart, of the family of Clanranald, and full cousin-german to Miss Flora MacDonald", between 28 & 29 December 1747 about the Rising and its aftermath for the highly important primary source The Lyon in Mourning. According to Bishop Forbes, during "the Year of the Pillaging", "Captain MacDonald had all his effects plundered and pillaged. After everything was destroyed or carried off, the party happened to spy a living cat, immediately killed the poor harmless puss, and threw it out of the way, lest the poor mother and her children should have eaten the dead cat in their necessity. For Cumberland and his army were exceedingly desirous that the young and old (women and infants not excepted) they did not murder might be starved to death, which was the fate of too many, and their endeavours were fully equal to their desires. Captain MacDonald and his wife and children wandered through hills and mountains until the act of indemnity appeared, and in the time of their skulking from place to place his poor wife fell ill with child, which happened to be a daughter, and is still alive." At their second meeting, on the evening of Wednesday 28 December 1748, Alasdair gave Bishop Forbes two pieces of wood said to be from the eight-oared boat in which the Prince had sailed from Borodale to Benbecula in the aftermath of Culloden. The Bishop always treasured them afterwards as a relic.

On 22 April 1751, he met again with Bishop Forbes at Leith and provided the latter with a detailed account of the violations of the laws and customs of war committed by both the Royal Navy and Hanoverian redcoats on the islands of Canna and Eigg.

== Ais-Eiridh na Sean Chánoin Albannaich ==
Alasdair then travelled to Edinburgh with the purpose of publishing his volume of poems entitled: Ais-Eiridh na Sean Chánoin Albannaich — (The Resurrection of the Old Scottish Language). The title poem in the collection is in praise of the Gaelic language and a call for language revival, which, according to Campbell, was modeled after the similar praise poem which Presbyterian minister Rev. John MacLean of Kilninian on the Isle of Mull, had composed in honour of pioneering Welsh Linguist and Celticist Edward Lhuyd. In other poems, Alasdair irately denounced the House of Hanover for having, "deprived the Highlanders of their natural garb and of the guns they used to hunt the deer, executed some of their natural leaders, and imprisoned and banished others". In one such poem, which is preserved elsewhere in manuscript, he drew upon a Gaelic proverb by saying that the love of King George II for the Gaels was, "but the love of the raven for its bone."

=== An Airce ===
Ais-Eiridh na Sean Chánoin Albannaich included the poem, An Airce ("The Ark"), a biting satire aimed at the Whigs of Clan Campbell.

Ma Thig a bhan-bhárd na d'lionamh Ostag mhío-narach an an Obain, Ceanagail achdair r'i do bhrandi, Go bi toirt dram do'n a rónamh: Ach ma chinnis i na Jonah 'S a sluggadh beo le muic-mhara: Go meal i a cairstealan fheólain; Ach a sgeith air córsa Chana.	"If the poetess comes into your nets, The shameless little female pubkeeper from Oban, Tie an anchor of brandy to her To give a dram to the seals. "But if she becomes a Jonah, And is swallowed alive by a whale, May she enjoy her fleshy quarters Provided she be spewed up on the coast of Canna."

In the poem, Colin Roy Campbell of Glenure, who has been appointed as the Crown's Factor on the forfeited lands of Clan Stewart of Appin and Clan Cameron of Lochiel, is one of the few Whigs for whom the ghost confesses a certain respect:

Ge toil leam Cailean Glinn Iubhair B' fheàrr leam gu 'm b' iubhar 's nach b' fheàrna; Bho 'n a threig e nàdur a mhuinntreach, 'S gann a dh' fhaodar cuim thoirt dà-san. Cuir boiseid de ionmhas Righ Deorsa, De smior an òir mu theis-meadhon; 'S ìobair e 'Neptun ge searbh e, Mur grad-ainmich e 'n rìgh dlighneach.	"Though Colin of Glenure I much esteem, Would that he was not alder but true yew; Since he forsook the allegiance of his sires, To be reprieved is not his due. "A girdle of the treasure of King George Of finest gold around his middle fling, And to Neptune offer him, though hard, Unless at once he name the rightful King".

=== Reaction and aftermath ===
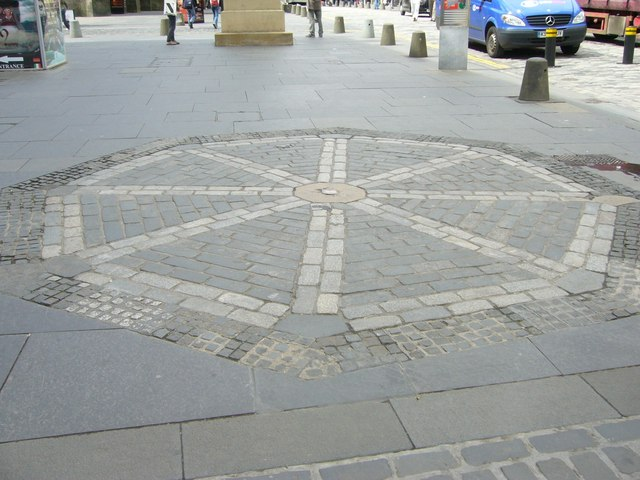
A memorial marking the location before 1756 of the Mercat Cross, Edinburgh, where the seized copies Alasdair MacDonald's poetry book were publicly burned by the city executioner.

According to Charles MacDonald writing in the 1880s, "In other passages he prays that the Butcher may have a rope tied around his neck and may be made to swing from it., – a blessing to which, if it could do any good, many a Highlander today would respond with a hearty amen. His choicest of offering to the King is the Scottish Maiden – i.e. the Guillotine – and so on. But these extravagant forms of lese majeste, and of course not at all to be approved of, even in a poet." Revealing that he saw the Jacobite risings as the continuation of the war his ancestors had waged against Oliver Cromwell, the Covenanters, and the Rump Parliament, Alasdair's book included English-Gaelic literary translations of three poems by Cavalier poet and Royalist General James Graham, 1st Marquess of Montrose, which expressed his loyalty to King Charles I and to the House of Stuart during the English Civil War.

According to Hamish MacPherson, "One of the many contradictions about Alasdair was that he was a fine writer about love, but also wrote some very bawdy work – he wrote Praise of Morag about his wife which is full of sensual double entendres but also wrote Dispraise of Morag which is out-and-out obscene."

According to a 2017 article by Peter Mackay, the two poems that Alasdair mac Mhaighstir Alasdair wrote about his wife are both based on the rhythms of bagpipe music. In Praise of Morag he likens his wife's breasts to geal criostal ("white crystal") and the lily of the valley, while comparing her skin to bog cotton and her kisses to cinnamon. In Dispraise of Morag, which was composed after his wife discovered her husband's infidelity, Morag NicDhòmhnaill was dubbed, A bhan-pheacach sin gun loinn, Làn de dh’fhòtas innt ("A graceless sinful girl, full of stinking pus").

According to John Lorne Campbell, two of the poems in Ais-Eridh na Sean Chánoin Albannaich, Òran air Sean aois ("A Song on Old Age") and Comh-radh, Mar go b' ann eider caraid agus namhaid an Uisgebheatha ("A Dialogue between a Friend and a Foe of Whisky"), were actually composed by Alasdair's close friend, the North Uist bard Iain Mac Fhearchair. Campbell also states "The invective he heaped on the reigning House and its supporters gained him the enthusiastic approval of friends and the severe displeasure of the Government. MacDonald himself escaped prosecution, but the unsold copies of the book were seized and burned by the public hangman in Edinburgh market-place in 1752."

The same collection also includes the poem Guidhe no Ùrnaigh an Ùghdair don Cheòlraidh ("The Author's Petition or Prayer to the Muses"), which Alasdair addresses to the Nine Muses and which, "reflects ruefully upon his own poetic powers." Another poem, Tineas na h-Urchaid ("The Venereal Disease") mocks the rotting flesh and the other symptoms of gonorrhea. It was composed during an outbreak of venereal disease among the population of Ardnamurchan and the Western Highlands. According to John Lorne Campbell, these diseases were most likely introduced to Ardnamurchan by Englishmen who arrived in the 1720s to work as hired labourers for Thomas Howard, 8th Duke of Norfolk and Sir George Wade in the lead mines at Strontian.

In a 2020 article, Hamish MacPherson expressed the belief that Alasdair's authorship of, "the world's first printed collection of Gaelic poetry... alone should make him worth revering, not least because its visceral criticism of the Hanoverian dynasty and the satire he employed to berate them are works of genius."

== Later life ==
Soon after the publication of his poem, the Captain of Clanranald's estate Factor evicted Alasdair and his family from Eigneig. The main reason for this was that William Harrison, the local Roman Catholic priest, had objected to Alasdair's composition of erotic poetry. Alasdair responded to his eviction at Harrison's urging by reviling Eignaig in satirical poetry. He moved again to Inverie (Scottish Gaelic: Inbhir Aoidh) in Knoydart (Scottish Gaelic: Cnòideart), to Morar (Scottish Gaelic: Mòrar). While in Morar, Alasdair composed a poem in praise of both the place and of Bishop Hugh MacDonald, the priests, and students at the illegal Buorblach seminary, who were less critical of his poetry and politics than Harrison had been.

He is believed to have composed his poem Birlinn Chlann Raghnaill, which is about the troubled voyage of a Highland War Galley from the ghost town of Loch Eynort in South Uist across the Irish Sea to Carrickfergus, in what is now Northern Ireland, and which remained unpublished until after his death, during the 1750s. According to Derick S. Thomson, however, "His major poem, Birlinn Chlann Raghnaill (The Galley of Clan Ranald) is... a striking tour de force of dramatic description, precisely constructed but accommodating elements of the fantastic and with echoes of the 'runs' from the saga Cath Fionntràgha, a version of which is in the poets own hand (Nat. Lib. MS 72.2.11)." Although Gaelic poetry was once assumed to be isolated from the literature of other languages, Alan Riach argues, "With Duncan Ban MacIntyre, you have someone who is illiterate but fluent in Gaelic, and composes his poetry to be sung, to be performed, as music; with Alasdair mac Mhaighstir Alasdair and The Birlinn of Clanranald you have an extremely sophisticated poet who reads fluently in a number of languages. So he's familiar with Homer and Virgil and the great epics of classical literature. He's familiar with poetry being written in English at the time. He's familiar with poetry written in Scots. His own writing in Gaelic is part of that continuum, part of that context."

The Captain and Chief of Clanranald then granted him land at Camas an t-Salainn and then Sandaig in Arisaig. He frequently travelled to North Uist, where he had a close friend in Iain Mac Fhearchair (John MacCodrum), the famed bard to Sir James MacDonald of Sleat.

== Death ==
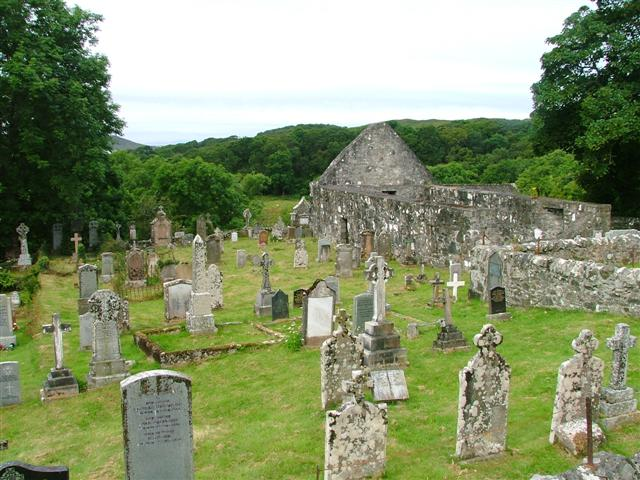
Alasdair Mac Mhaighstir Alasdair rests in an unknown plot in the cemetery beside the ruins of St. Maelrubha's Roman Catholic Church at Arisaig.

He died in 1770. Alasdair Mac Mhaighstir Alasdair was buried in the cemetery of Kilmorie, close to the present Catholic church of Arisaig.

Although the exact location of the Alasdair's grave is no longer known, a wall plaque was erected in 1927 in St. Maelrubha's Roman Catholic cemetery in Arisaig, which reads, "In this graveyard in a now forgotten spot lies Alasdair MacMhaighstir Alasdair (Alexander MacDonald) The Clanranald Bard, born probably at Dalilea House, Loch Shiel, 1700, died at Sannaig, Arisaig, 1780. This bronze is erected to his memory (1927) by a few Jacobite admirers in New Zealand and some fellow clansmen at home in recognition of his greatness as a Gaelic poet. R.I.P."

== Literary and cultural legacy ==
According to Alan Riach, Alasdair mac Mhaighstir Alasdair's high level of education, his ability to read and write in his own language, and his multilingual understanding of the Western canon from Classical literature to the time of the French and Scottish Enlightenments, is what sets him apart from the other truly great Gaelic poets of the era.

According to Derrick S. Thomson, "He was a man of strong views and violent emotions but with a hard intellectual cast of mind also; he was learned in the Gaelic tradition and open to influence from his other reading; he was an innovator and a conservative; and his poetry is full of the stimulating contradictions that proceed from these diversities."

According to Charles MacDonald, who considered Alasdair to share, "with Duncan Bàn M'Intyre the foremost place in the ranks of Celtic poets", also commented, "MacDonald was undoubtedly a person of high poetical genius, and although critics may differ as to the exact merits of some of his productions, no one will deny that there are certain poems - for instance, the Galley of Clanranald - which will be read and relished as long as the Gaelic language lives."

Iain mac Ailein was one of many Gaelic-speaking Seanchaidhe who could recite the entirety of Alasdair mac Mhaighstir Alasdair's immram poem Birlinn Chloinne Raghnaill ("The Birlinn of Clanranald"), from memory.

According to John Lorne Campbell, however, "...no satisfactory text of MacDonald's poems has yet been produced. Apart from the peculiarities of his own spelling – which represents nearly the first attempt to adapt the orthography of the old literary language common to Scotland and Ireland to the vernacular of the Highlands – he uses forms which are not now employed in modern speech, and which have been consequently removed by all his editors from MacPherson onwards, presumably as a concession to readers unwilling to acquaint themselves with obsolete forms of the language."

During the 21st century Ballachulish-based poet and musician Griogair Labhruidh also performed Alasdair mac Mhaighstir Alasdair's Òran Eile don Phrionnsa ("Another Song to the Prince"), titled by its first line Moch sa Mhadainn 's Mi a' Dùsgadh, as part of the Soundtrack for the 2nd and 4th Seasons of the TV series Outlander.

In 1995, a memorial cairn was erected at the sandy beach upon Eriskay known as Coilleag a' Phrionnsa ("The Cockel Strand of the Prince") where Prince Charles Edward Stuart first set foot on Scottish soil. The inscription it bears is also the first stanza of Òran Eile don Phrionnsa:

"Moch sa mhadainn 's mi dùsgadh
'S mòr mo shunnd 's mo cheòl-gàire
On a chuala mi 'm Prionnsa
Thighinn do dhùthaich Chlann Raghnaill."

"Early in the morning as I wakened,
great [is] my joy,
for I hear that [the Prince] comes
to the land of Clanranald."

In a deeply ironic contrast, anti-war poet Dòmhnall Iain Dhonnchaidh (1919–1986) somewhat facetiously rewrote the same poem in 1946. In Dòmhnall Iain Dhonnchaidh's version, however, he instead speaks of his joy at waking up on board a ship that was about to return him to the peacetime and civilian life on South Uist which had once bored him terribly, after the horrors of combat during the 1940 Fall of France followed by six years of backbreaking manual labor as a POW in Nazi Germany during World War II.

In 2012, at the request of the National Trust for Scotland, Scottish artist Ronald Elliot painted Prince Charles Edward Stuart and Alasdaird having breakfast together beside the captured cannons while both looking extremely haunted, immediately following the Jacobite Army victory at the Battle of Prestonpans.

In 2020, Aiseirigh: Òrain le Alastair Mac Mhaighstir Alastair, the first ever complete and uncensored collection of Alasdair's verse, was edited by Sgàire Uallas and published by An Clò Glas, a Canadian Gaelic publishing house based in West Montrose, Ontario. In May 2023, Taylor Strickland's translations of Alasdair mac Mhaighstir Alasdair's Gaelic poetry were published by Broken Sleep Books, under the title Dastram / Delirium. The book was a Poetry Book Society Translation Choice, and won The Scottish Poetry Book of the Year award in 2023. Ironically, despite his own personal Monarchism, Alasdair has been used by some to advocate for Scottish independence and even republicanism. In another 2020 article, Hamish MacPherson praised Robert Burns and Alasdair MacDhòmhnuill as the two greatest Scottish poets in any language and called it, "a national disgrace that there is no national monument" anywhere in Scotland to Alasdair. MacPherson then wrote, "I believe Alasdair is a poet whose personal journey is an example to all of us who have joined the cause of independence and all those who are still to be converted. For Alasdair was a linguistic innovator who was a scholar of the Classics but became the champion of Gaelic and the culture of the Gael, a Protestant teacher who converted to Catholicism, and a man of peace who fought for Prince Charles Edward Stuart in the 1745 Jacobite Rising. In other words, someone who found his true beliefs and fought for them with words as his chief weapons – shouldn't that be all of us Scots?"

According to John Lorne Campbell, ghost stories about sightings of the undead spectre of Alasdair mac Mhaighstir Alasdair or of his brother Lachlan on South Uist and other islands are very commonly told in Hebridean mythology and folklore.

== Gaelic naming conventions ==
- The poet's Gaelic name means "Alasdair, son of the Reverend Alasdair". His father, also named Alasdair, was known as Maighstir Alasdair ("Master Alexander") which was then the way of referring to a clergyman in Scottish Gaelic. In English, Maighstir Alasdair was known as the "Reverend Alexander MacDonald".
