= James Logan (writer) =

Scottish writer (1797–1872)

James Logan (1797–1872) was a Scottish author on Gaelic culture, best known for his 1831 book The Scottish Gaël.

== Life ==
Logan was born in Aberdeen, where his father was a merchant; he was educated at Aberdeen grammar school and Marischal College. A sports injury made him give up a potential career as a lawyer.

In London with the support of Lord Aberdeen, Logan studied at the Royal Academy. He became a journalist, and then a clerk in an architect's office. He was employed for a time by the Highland Society of London, but never settled to a career. A brother of the London Charterhouse, he was expelled in 1866. With Scottish patrons, he sustained a fair standard of living, and died in London in April 1872.

== Works ==
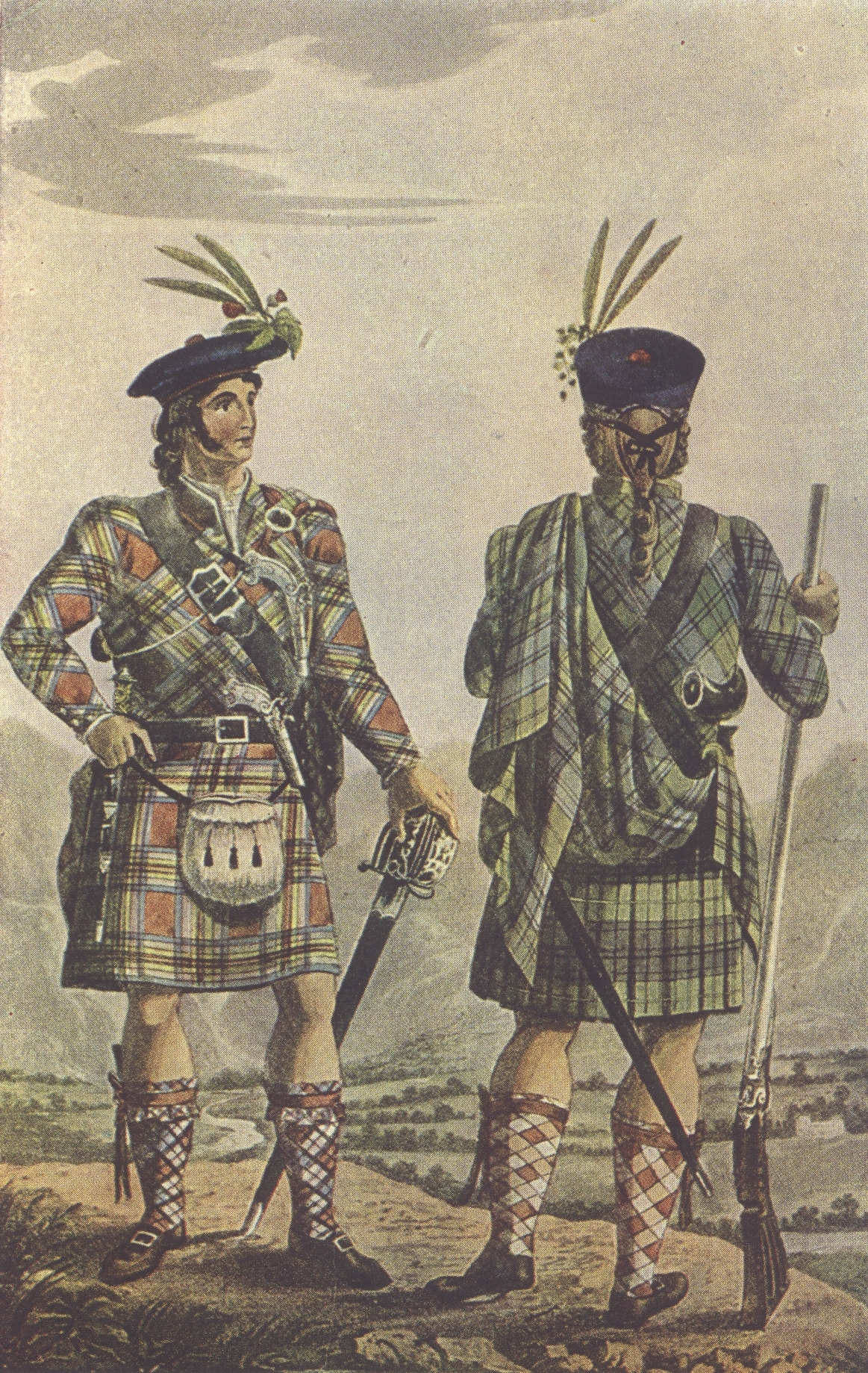
Highland Chiefs, illustration by James Logan from The Scottish Gaël (1831)

Logan's major work was The Scottish Gaël, or Celtic Manners as preserved among the Highlanders (2 vols.), published in 1831. It was based on walking tours he had made in the Scottish highlands and islands during the previous decade, during which he collected Gaelic antiquities. The work was dedicated to William IV, illustrated by the author, and sold well on good reviews. In 1876, Alexander Stewart published a second edition. From a modern scholarly view, its value is largely in the Highland customs observed, with the historical material regarded as obsolete. Other works were:

- Introduction and letterpress to A Collection of Ancient Piobaireachd or Highland Pipe Music (1838) by Angus MacKay (anonymous, an influential publication though not now considered reliable on family history)
- Introduction to John Mackenzie's Sar-obair nam Bard Gaelach: or Beauties of Gaelic Poetry (2 vols., 1841, new edition 1877)
- Letterpress to Robert Ronald McIan's Clans of the Scottish Highlands (1845–47)
- Highland Costumes, 2 vols., illustrated (1843–49), new edition 1857

He also contributed to the Gentleman's Magazine.
