= Milton (South Uist) =

Coordinates: 57.21684°N 7.40135°W

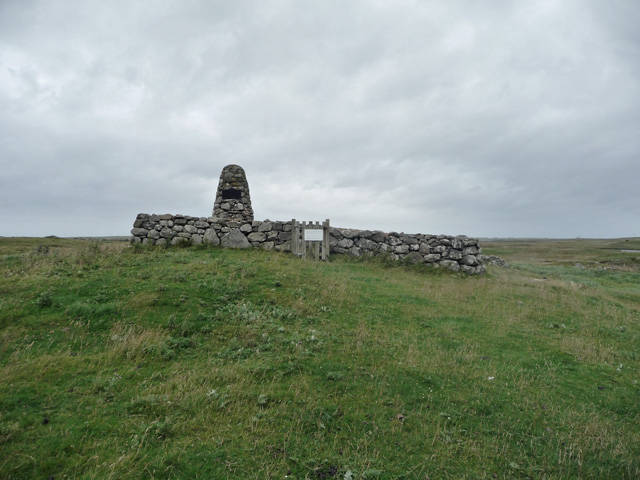
Flora MacDonald memorial

Milton (Scottish Gaelic: Geàrraidh Bhailteas) is the name of a tack or tenant farm on the island of South Uist in the Outer Hebrides, Scotland. It was on this tack that Jacobite heroine Flora MacDonald was born and spent her childhood. A memorial dedicated to her stands at the remains of the township.
