= Clan Macdonald of Clanranald =

Highland Scottish clan

Macdonald of Clanranald
- Clann Raghnaill
- Crest: A triple-towered castle Argent masoned Sable, and issuing from the centre tower a dexter arm in armour embowed grasping a sword all Proper
- Motto: My hope is constant in thee
- War cry: Dh'aindeoin có theireadh e (Gainsay, who dares) [ə ˈɣaɲən ˈkʰoː ˈheɾʲəɣ ɛ]

Profile
- Region: Highland
- District: Lochaber; Hebrides
- Plant badge: Common heath

Chief
- Ranald Alexander Macdonald of Clanranald
- The 24th Chief and Captain of Clanranald (Mac Mhic Ailein)
- Seat: Morenish House
- Historic seat: Castle Tioram
Clan branches
Macdonalds of Glenaladale
Macdonalds of Kinlochmoidart
Macdonalds of Belfinlay
Macdonalds of Boisdale
Macdonalds of Borrodale
Macdonalds of Knoydart
Macdonalds of Morar
Maceachainn/Macdonalds.
Allied clans
Clan Cameron
Rival clans
Clan MacLean
Clan MacKenzie
Clan Fraser of Lovat
Kindreds
MacMhuirich bardic family
Clann Ruaidhrí

Clan Macdonald of Clanranald, also known as Clan Ranald (Scottish Gaelic: Clann Raghnaill [ˈkʰl̪ˠãũn̪ˠ ˈrˠɤ̃ː.ɪʎ]), is a Highland Scottish clan and a branch of Clan Donald, one of the largest Scottish clans. The founder of the Macdonalds of Clanranald is Reginald, 4th great-grandson of Somerled. The Macdonalds of Clanranald descend from Reginald's elder son Allan and the MacDonells of Glengarry descend from his younger son Donald.

The clan chief of the MacDonalds of Clanranald is traditionally designated as The Captain of Clanranald and "Son of Ailein's son" (Scottish Gaelic: Mac Mhic Ailein) and today both the chief and clan are recognised by the Lord Lyon King of Arms, the heraldic judge in Scotland.

== History of the MacDonalds of Clanranald ==
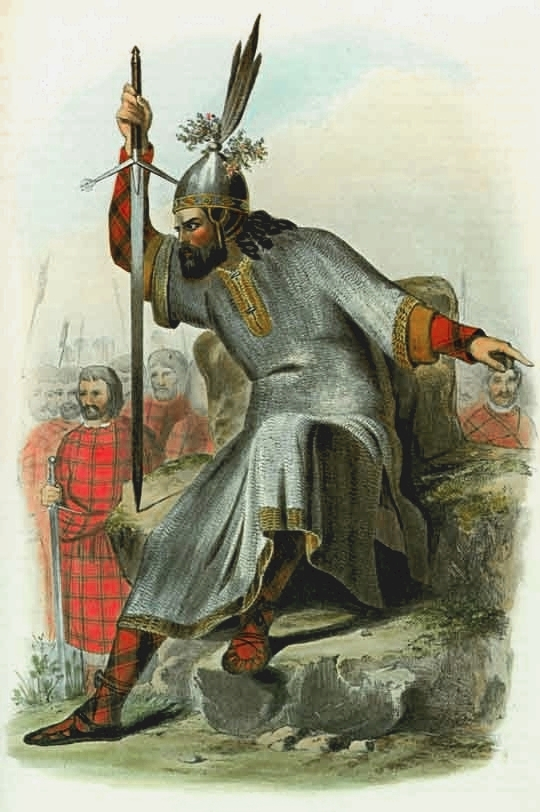
R.R. McIan's Victorian era romanticised depiction of a Macdonald, lord of the Isles.

=== Origins ===
The MacDonalds of Clanranald are one of the branch clans of Clan Donald—one of the largest Scottish clans. The eponymous ancestor of Clan Donald is Donald, son of Reginald, son of Somerled. Somerled, son of Gillebride was a 12th-century leader, styled as "king of the isles" and "king of Argyll", though his origins and ancestry are obscure. The Macdonalds of Clanranald descend from Donald's son, Angus Mor and then from his son, Angus Og. Angus Og's son John was the first Lord of the Isles. John's first marriage was to Amie mac Ruari, heiress of Clann Ruaidhrí (which was founded by Ruaidhrí, elder brother to Donald, founder of Clan Donald). John later divorced Amie and married Margaret, daughter of Robert II. The children from John's first marriage were passed over in the main succession and the chiefship of Clan Donald and the later Macdonald Lords of the Isles would go on to descend from John's second marriage. The Macdonalds of Clanranald and MacDonells of Glengarry both descend from John and Amie's eldest son, Reginald.

=== 14th century ===
Reginald, 1st of Clanranald, succeeded through his mother Amie mac Ruari in the majority of the old lands of Clann Ruaidhrí. In 1371, his father John confirmed this succession by a charter of these lands; this charter also granted him others on the mainland. John's charter was confirmed the following year by Robert II; it included the lands of Eigg, Rum, Uist, Harris, the three pennylands of Sunart and Letterlochette, the two pennylands of Ardgour, the pennylands of Hawlaste and sixty merklands in Lochaber. On their father John's death, Reginald's younger half-brother, Donald, son of John and Margaret, succeeded to the lordship of the isles and chiefship of Clan Donald. Reginald died in 1386 at Castle Tioram and was buried at Relig Odhráin on Iona. He was succeeded by his eldest son, Allan. According to the family seanachie MacVuirich, Reginald's brother Godfrey took possession of the former Clann Ruaidhrí lands of Uist and those on the mainland, leaving Reginald's sons the lands in Lochaber.

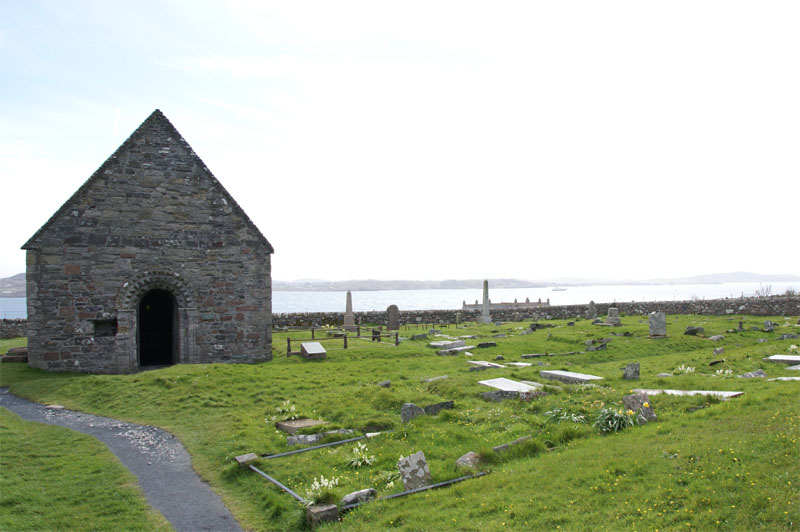
Relig Odhráin: the cemetery surrounding St Oran's Chapel on Iona. It was the burial grounds of the earliest chiefs of Clanranald.

This early era from Reginald down to his great-grandson Allan, son of Roderick, is by far the most obscure in the history of the clan. From the years 1372–1495, no charters of the family exist and it is impossible to know for certain exactly what territories it possessed. The earliest document to shed some light on this era is a charter granted by James V to John Moidartach in 1531. It states that the lands granted had been held by his grandfather, Allan, son of Roderick, and his predecessors. The lands mentioned were the 27 merklands of Moidart, the 30 merklands of Arisaig, 21 merklands in Eigg, and the 30 merklands of Skirhough, in South Uist. According to Angus and Archibald Macdonald, it seems likely that this mere fragment of Ranald's original lands was all that the senior branch of Reginald's descendants had left by the time of Allan, 2nd of Clanranald.

=== 15th century ===
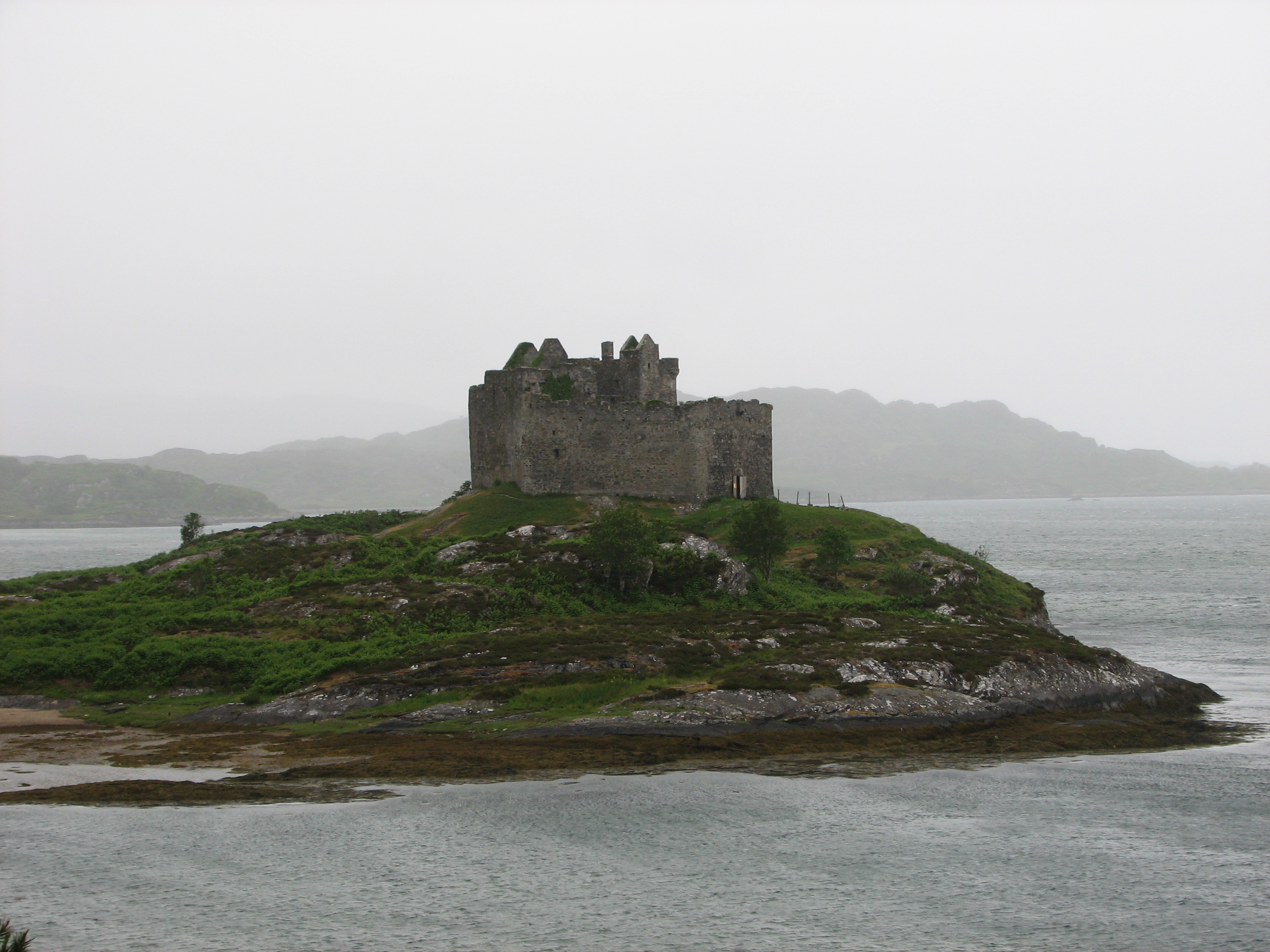
Castle Tioram is the traditional seat of the Clan MacDonald of Clanranald.

In 1427, James summoned parliament at Inverness and summoned the area chiefs. Of those, Alexander (son of Godfrey and nephew of Reginald) and John MacArthur (of Clan Arthur) were immediately seized and executed. Allan, son of Reginald, seems to have survived, as his name is recorded in the Exchequer Rolls for the year 1428. This is the only contemporary record of Allan to exist; although his name appears in the genealogies and manuscript histories of the clan, nothing else is recorded of him, and thus there is nothing to show whether he succeeded to his father's lands after the execution of Alexander. It is however likely that, as he held a crown charter for the lands, the king would have preferred him to other claimants. Allan is also said to have fought at the Battle of Harlaw in 1411, as did his brothers Donald and Dugald (who was slain). According to Macdonald and Macdonald, Allan likely died sometime between 1428 and 1430 at Castle Tioram and was buried at Relig Odhráin. He was succeeded by his eldest son, Roderick.

The descendants of Godfrey gradually decayed in power after the death of Alexander, though they continued to hold the lands of North Uist.

Roderick, 3rd of Clanranald, supported the Earl of Ross against the Scottish crown, joining him in the earl's 1429 expedition against Inverness. The MS History of the Mackintoshes states that Roderick collected a band of men "accustomed to live by rapine, fell upon Inverness, pillaged and burnt the houses". In 1431, Roderick fought under Donald Balloch against the king's troops at Lochaber. In 1455, he was part of a Macdonald failed raid on Sutherland, in which the History of Clanranald states that while the Macdonalds were ultimately defeated in the engagement, Roderick succeeded in saving most of his men and returned to Castle Tioram. In 1469, the John II, Lord of the Isles granted to his half-brother Hugh of Sleat, much of the lands that were originally held by Ranald. These included the 30 merklands of Skirbough in South Uist, the 12 merklands of Benbecula, and the 60 merklands of North Uist. It also appears the Hugh of Sleat additionally held 24 merklands in Arisaig and 21 merklands in Eigg. In consequence on Roderick's death, his descendants were left with a heritage of disputed territories. Roderick died in 1481, was buried at Relig Odhráin, and was succeeded by his eldest son, Allan.

Allan, 4th of Clanranald, is regarded as one of the greater chiefs of the clan. He was one of the main supporters of Angus, bastard son of John II, Lord of the Isles, during the Battle of Bloody Bay. During the battle, which was located between Ardnamurchan and Tobermory, Angus defeated his father John. Following Angus' death, Allan supported Alexander of Lochaslsh, who would have likely been thought of as the presumptive heir of the lordship of the isles. Allan also supported Alexander of Lochalsh at the Battle of Blar Na Pairce in about 1488, against the Mackenzies. In 1491 Alexander raised his standard and was joined by his kinsmen the MacDonalds of Keppoch, and the Camerons and the Macdonalds of Clanranald. From Lochaber they marched through Badenoch, joined by members of Clan Chattan and Rose of Kilravock, with the intent of harrying the lands of the Earl of Huntly. From Badenoch the rebels then marched towards Inverness, taking possession and garrisoning it. The lands of Alexander Urquhart of Cromarty, who had opposed the Earl of Ross, were ravished and most of the booty carried off fell into the hands of the Macdonalds of Clanranald. The spoil gained by the clan was reckoned to have been 600 cows and oxen, 80 horses, 1000 sheep, 200 swine, and 500 bolls victual. The following year the clan was ordered by the Government to indemnify Urquhart and his tenants for the loss they sustained in the rebellion; however it is not known if any restitution was ever made by the rebels. When James IV first visited the Highlands after fall of the lordship of the isles, Allan was one of the few chiefs to render his homage. During the reign of Allan's chiefship, a dispute arose between himself, John Cathanach Macdonald, 4th of Dunnyveg, and MacIan of Ardnamurchan, concerning the lands of Sunart. The Government ordered that the lands were to be maintained by the current tenants until the dispute was settled between the chiefs and the king's advisors. Very soon after this, Alexander of Lochalsh again raised a revolt. However, this time Allan refused to join, though it is likely he harassed Lochalsh's enemy—Mackenzie of Kintail.

Gaelic scholar Henry Whyte (Fionn), once recorded a story about Allan Macdonald's bitter feud with Hector Odhar Maclean, 9th chief of Duart. Considered "the dread and terror of all the neighbouring clans," Allan made a name for himself by confining the chiefs of Macleod, Mackintosh, and Mackay of Strathnaver in Castle Tioram.

During the time of the feud, Allan took one vessel only and set out to sail between Moidart and the small Isles. As Whyte tells it:

The man on the look-out descried another large birlinn coming round the point of Ardnamurchan. "Whose is she?" asked Allan. "The Chief of Maclean's." "My dire foe," ejaculated Allan. "Shall we put about?" asked the steersman. "She will overtake us," said the watchman; "she is large and full of men." "Go on," said Allan, spread my plaid over me, stretched on this beam; if hailed or questioned, say you are conveying Allan MacRuaire's remains to Iona. Play the family Lament, piper." They were hailed, and answered as directed. "Let them pass with the dead," said the Chief of Maclean; "we are well quit of Allan." As soon as they were out of sight, Allan arose and said, "Row to the nearest point of Mull." He landed and, taking some of his men, ordered the rest to row to Aros Bay. On his way across to Aros, he set fire to the houses. In the meantime, Maclean landed in Moidart and commenced to carry off the cattle. Some who ascended the highest hill saw the island of Mull in smoke and immediately informed their chief. "Ha!" says he. "Allan is come alive; leave the cattle and let us back and intercept our foe on his return. When Allan arrived at Aros, he boarded his galley and said, "Row, men, to Loch Suaineart [Sunart], and avoid a second meeting; quick, ere he doubles the point." They landed at Salen, Loch Suaineart; withdrawing the wooden pins[,] the birlinn was soon in planks and on the shoulders of the men and soon launched on the waters of Sheilfoot, and Allan was in his castle as soon as Maclean arrived at his own; and thus saved his cattle by burning a few thatched houses."

Nothing else is known of Allan's chiefship. Macdonald and Macdonald state that Allan died in 1505 at Blair Atholl. He was succeeded by his son, Ranald Bane.

=== 16th century ===
Ranald Bane, like his father, was tried in the presence of the king and executed for an unrecorded crime. He died in 1509 at Perth and was succeeded by his eldest son, Dougall. Due to his cruelty towards his own clansfolk, Dougall was assassinated in 1520 by members of his clan and his sons were excluded from the succession of the chiefship. On his death the leadership of the clan transferred to his uncle, Alexander, son of Allan, 4th of Clanranald. Alexander, 7th of Clanranald lead the clan until his death, sometime before 1530. With the exclusion of Dougalls heirs, Ranald Gallda, son of Allan, 4th of Clanranald, became the nearest male heir to the chiefship.

The seal of John Moidartach (from 1572).

John Moidartach, 8th of Clanranald, on the death of his father, possessed Moidart, Arasaig and Castle Tioram. In 1540 he was apprehended by James V and placed in prison. Lord Lovat and the Frasers supported Ranald Gallda and the charters which had previously been held by John were revoked and granted to Ranald Gallda as heir of his father Allan. When John Moidartach was finally released from prison Ranald Gallda was forced to flee from Clanranald lands and took refuge with Lord Lovat. The Macdonalds of Clanranald then took the offensive and supported by the MacDonalds of Keppoch and Camerons raided into Fraser lands. They overran Lovat's lands of Stratherrick and Abertarf and the Grant's lands of Urquhart and Glenmoriston, taking Castle Urquhart. The whole district was plundered and the invaders planned to permanently occupy the newly won territories before they were forced to retreat with the arrival of the Earl of Huntly, Lovat, Grant and Ranald Gallda. As the Clanranald supporters of John Moidartach had fled from the scene, Ranald Gallda again occupied Moidart. John Moidartach's Clanranald supporters overtook Huntly and his followers near Kinlochlochy where the Battle of the Shirts was fought on 15 July 1544. Lovat, the Master of Lovat and Ranald Gallda were slain and almost all of their followers as well. As a result of the victory, John Moidartach's hold of the Clanranald chiefship was maintained.

On 3 August 1564 Mary, Queen of Scots, who was in Glen Tilt, wrote to Colin Campbell of Glenorchy, asking him to demolish a house of strength on an island in Loch Rannoch. Members of the Clan Macdonald of Clanranald were rebuilding the house, which her father James V had previously ordered to be demolished.

John Moidartach died in 1584 and was buried at Howmore, South Uist. He was succeeded by his eldest son, Allan. In 1588, Allan, 9th of Clanranald quarrelled with Alexander Macdonald of Keppoch and killed his Keppoch's brother. Allan was never pardoned for the murder and never received any charters from the crown for his lands, yet he possessed them undisturbed for the duration of his life. Allan married a daughter of Alasdair Crotach and his ill treatment of her was the cause of violent feuds between the Macdonalds of Clanranald and the Macleods. Allan's eldest son died before him. Allan died in 1593 and was buried at Islandfinnan. On his death he was succeeded by his eldest surviving son, Angus. Angus, 10th of Clanranald was killed shortly after his succession to the chiefship, and was succeeded by his brother, Donald.

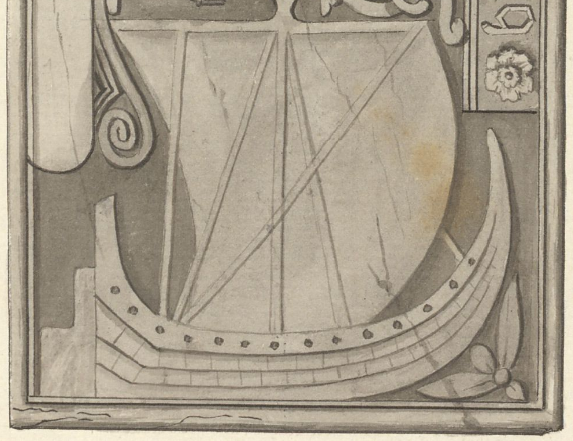
A 16th-century engraving of a Highland galley or birlinn. The Macdonalds of Clanranald utilised such vessels in their constant warring with other nearby Hebridean clans, such as the Macleans.

Donald, 11th of Clanranald married the daughter of Angus Macdonald of Dunnyveg and the Glens. His father-in-law's clan was then actively warring with the Macleans of Duart and their chief Lachlan Mor Maclean of Duart. The Macdonalds of Clanranald would have welcomed such an alliance as some years before, Lachlan Mor at the head of his clan and 100 mercenaries hired from the Spanish Armada had ravaged the islands of Rum and Eigg. Working in co-operation with each other, the two Macdonald chiefs invaded Coll, Mull and Tiree, laying waste to the islands, and Donald returned to Castle Tioram with his galleys full of spoil. Lachlan Mor was at first unable to retaliate, but his time soon came. In the summer of 1594, Donald Gorm Mor Macdonald of Sleat and Ruariri Mor Macleod of Harris and Dunvegan each sailed for Ulster at the head of 500 men each. They force was intended to support Hugh O'Donnell who was besieging Enniskillen Castle. Later in 1595 another expedition of Hebredians was made to support the Irish rebels against the forces of Elizabeth I. Donald Gorm Mor of Sleat raised a fighting force of 4,000 men and sailed to Ulster in a fleet of 50 galleys and 70 supply ships. The fleet was however blown off course and was attacked off Rathlin Island by 3 English frigates. 13 Macdonald galleys were sunk and another 12 or 13 were destroyed or captured off Copeland Island, at the entrance to Belfast Lough. The same year, and likely as part of this operation, Donald and John Og MacIain of Ardnamurchan sailed for Ulster at the head of 2,000 men. The fleet of galleys sheltered for the night off the Sound of Mull, possibly at Calve Island near Tobermory. That night the Lachlan Mor, at the head of 1,200 men surprised the Macdonalds and killed 350 of them in the ensuring battle. Donald, and several other Macdonald chieftains were captured by the Macleans.

In 1601, the Macdonalds of Clanranald joined the MacDonells of Glengarry in their constant warring with the Mackenzies of Kintail, ravaging and laying waste to the Kintail area. While the Macdonald fighting force was in the Kintail area, trouble was brewing in South Uist as Murdoch MacNeil of Barra had taken possession of the lands of Boisdale under the pretext that they belonged to the MacNeils of Barra. Donald led his fighting force down South Uist and fought the MacNeils at North Boisdale, killing most of them. The surviving MacNeils fled to the remoter islands of the Barra Isles, where Murdoch was finally slain by the Macdonalds of Clanranald. Donald, like other Highland chiefs was in debt to the Scottish crown and other chiefs, and he was one of the chiefs who met with the kings' commissioners on Mull agreeing to give security for the king's rents; submit themselves to the laws of the realm. Donald was knighted at Holyrood by James VI, in 1617. He died at Castle Tioram in 1618 and was succeeded by his son, John.

=== 17th century ===
John, 12th of Clanranald, took part in the wars with Montrose, joining Montrose and Alasdair MacColla, son of Colla Ciotach, at the Battle of Inverlochy in 1645. Soon after he returned to his lands to raise more of his clan to find the garrison of Mingarry had been attacked by the Earl of Argyll. He then defeated Argyll and reinforced the garrison. The Macdonalds of Clanranald then laid waste to the whole of Sunart and Ardnamurchan. John died in 1670 on Eriskay, South Uist and was buried at Howmore on the same island. He was succeeded by his only son, Donald.

Donald, 13th of Clanranald lived for the most part at Castle Tioram, on which he made extensive repairs. He died in 1686 at Canna, and was buried at Howmore. He was succeeded by his eldest surviving son, Allan. Allan, 14th of Clanranald was educated at Inverness and also by university tutors at home. His principal residence, Castle Tioram, was garrisoned by William of Orange after the Battle of Killiecrankie in 1689; the garrison was removed in 1698.

=== 18th century ===
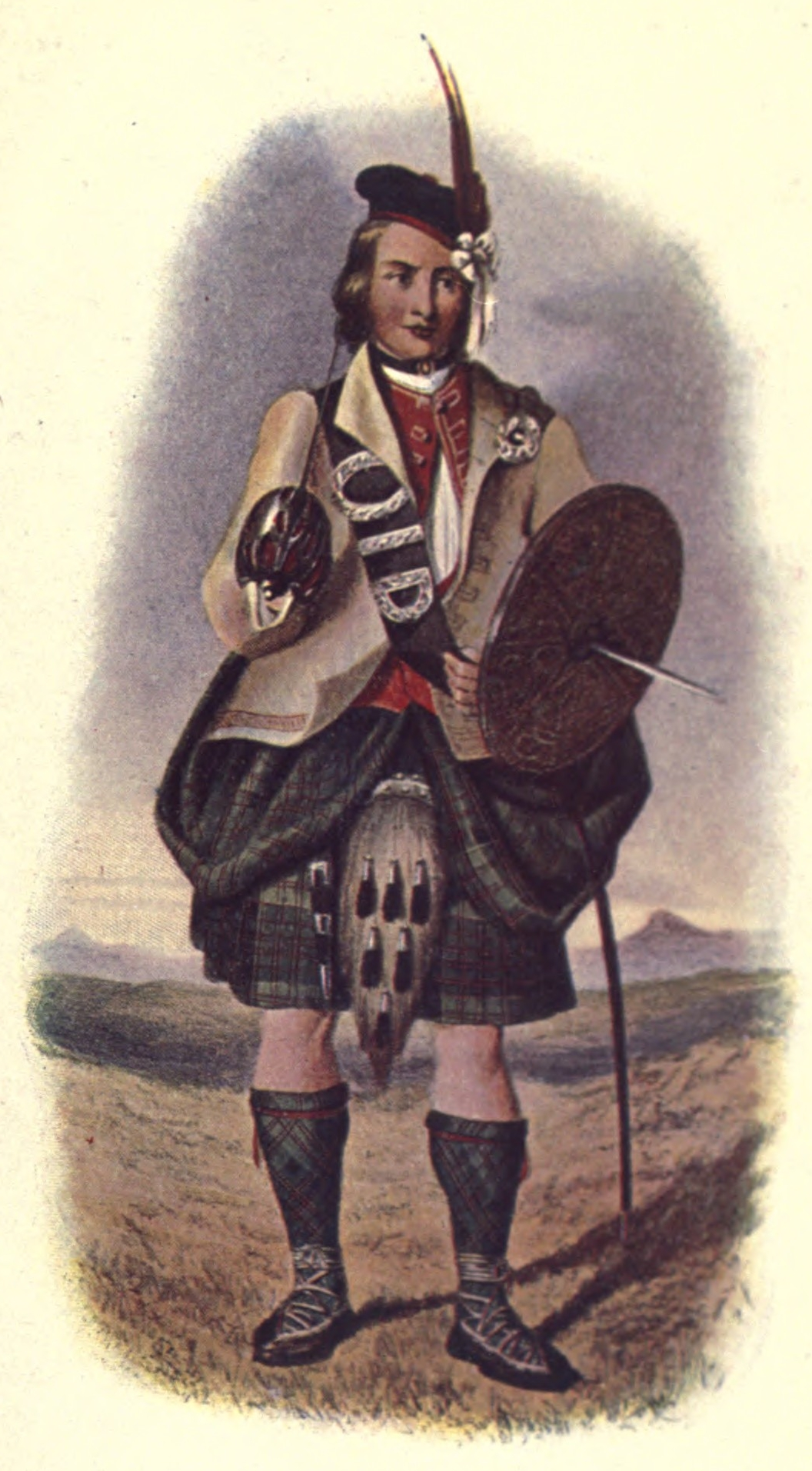
R. R. McIan's Victorian era romanticised depiction of a Macdonald of Clanranald.

Allan was mortally wounded at the Battle of Sheriffmuir in 1715 and died at Drummond Castle the next day. He was buried at Innerpeffray, which was the burial place of the Perth family. He was succeeded by his brother, Ranald. General Wade's report on the Highlands in 1724, estimated the clan strength (Macdonel's of Moidart) at 800 men. Ranald, 15th of Clanranald never married and died at Fauborg St Germains, in 1725 and was buried in Paris. He was succeeded by Donald Macdonald of Benbecula, to whom the forfeited Clanranald estates were later restored. Donald, 16th of Clanranald died in 1730 and was buried at Cladh Mhuire, Nunton. He was succeeded by his eldest son, Ranald. Ranald, 17th of Clanranald was born in 1692. He refused to aid Charles Edward Stuart and the Jacobites during the 1745 rebellion. The chief however did not stop his eldest son and heir, Ranald, from doing so. He died at Nunton in 1766, where he was buried. He was succeeded by his eldest son, Ranald. Ranald, 18th of Clanranald was educated in France where he became acquainted with Charles Edward Stuart. While his father was still chief of the clan, Ranald was, along with Macdonald of Kinlochmoidart and his brother Macdonald of Glenaladale, the first to join Charles Edward Stuart in 1745. After deciding to join, Ranald raised 250 clansmen and after the raising of the standard at Glenfinnan, Ranald led 500 men to Dundee arriving there on 8 September and proclaimed James Francis Edward Stuart as king. The Macdonalds of Clanranald were present at the Battle of Prestonpans and the Battle of Falkirk. The Clanranald regiment, whose company commanders included the legendary Gaelic poet Alasdair MacMhaighstir Alasdair and his older brother Aonghas Beag MacDhòmhnaill of Dalilea, and which fought at the Battle of Culloden in April 1746, consisted of 200 men. During the battle the Macdonald regiments were located on the Jacobite extreme left wing instead of their preferred place on the right wing. Popular legend has it that these regiments refused to charge when ordered to do so, due to the perceived insult of being placed on the left wing. The Clanranald regiment was disbanded at Fort Augustus, two days after their defeat at Culloden. Following the defeat of the Jacobite rebellion, Ranald spent some time in France, before finally returning to Scotland. He died at Nunton in 1776, where he was buried. He was succeeded by his eldest son, John Moidartach. John Moidartach, 19th of Clanranald died in Edinburgh in 1794 and was buried at Holyrood. He was succeeded by his eldest surviving son, Ranald George.

=== 19th century to present ===
Ranald George, 20th of Clanranald was born in 1788. From 1813 to 1838, he sold almost all the traditional Clanranald lands, which had belonged to the line of Somerled for 800 years, for a total sum of over £213,211. Seeking to cover his debts and to fund further extravagant spending, by the end the Chief still held only the ruins of Castle Tioram. He died in London in 1873 and was buried at Brompton Cemetery. He was succeeded by his son, Reginald John James George, 21st of Clanranald an admiral in the Royal Navy. He died in London, in 1899, and was succeeded by his son Allan Douglas. Allan Douglas, 22nd of Clanranald, was born in 1856 and was a captain in the Royal Artillery. He was succeeded by his brother, Angus Roderick. The direct line of Clanranald chiefs became extinct in 1944, following the death of Angus Roderick, 23rd of Clanranald. The chiefship then passed into the line of the Macdonalds of Boisdale who are a branch of the clan. Recently, (2013), the line was discovered to not have died out (having been discovered through research) and is currently being reviewed by the court of the Lord Lyon. The current chief is Ranald Alexander Macdonald of Clanranald, 24th Chief and Captain of Clanranald, who was recognised as such by the Lord Lyon King of Arms in 1956, The current chief is a member of the Standing Council of Scottish Chiefs, and also the High Council of Clan Donald.

=== Effects of the Highland Clearances ===
In the 18th and 19th centuries, the common members of the clan and other families living on the Clanranald estates, suffered grievously from the Highland Clearances and also religious persecution at the hands of the Clanranald chief.

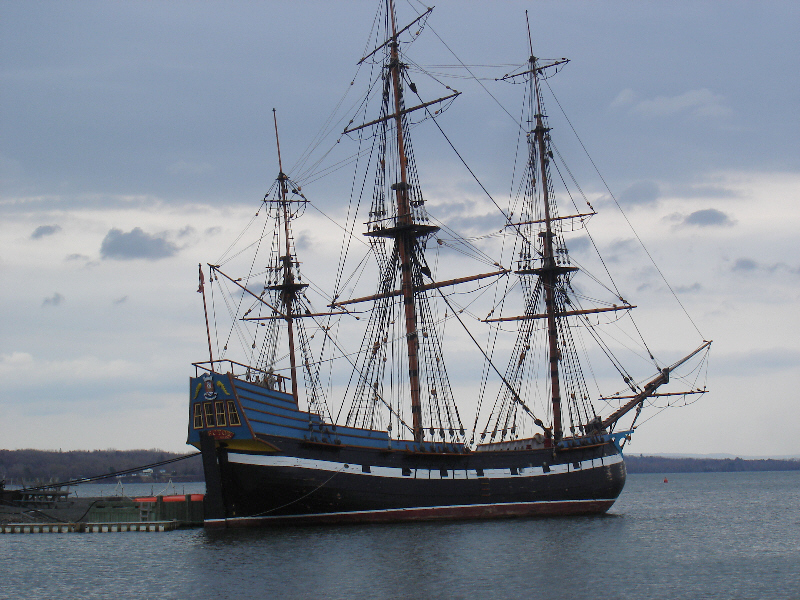
The Hector carried almost 200 poor Scottish settlers to Nova Scotia in 1773. The year before, over 200 people from South Uist sailed for Prince Edward Island to escape religious persecution at the hands of the chief of Clan Macdonald of Clanranald.

Clan members and others living on the Clanranald estates also suffered from religious persecution at the hands of their own chief. In 1769, the chief of the Macdonalds of Clanranald attempted to forcibly convert his tenants on South Uist to Presbyterianism, threatening to remove them from his lands. In 1772, over 200 Roman Catholics mainly from the Clanranald estates of South Uist, Barra, Eigg and mainland western Inverness-shire emigrated to Prince Edward Island. The immigrants first settled at Scotchfort on the northeast side of the island, which had been established by a prominent tacksman, John MacDonald of Glenaladale with the assistance of the Scottish Catholic Church. The newly arrived immigrants however did not immediately escape religious persecution, as Catholics were barred from holding land until 1780. The first winter hit the settlement hard and a year later a local minister wrote that they were in "great misery". In 1790–1791, a second wave of about 900 fresh emigrants from South Uist, Barra, Moidart, and Morar, settled in the area. Because of their late arrival, these new settlers also suffered from the first winter. At around the same time in 1791, another 650 emigrants from the Clanranald estates established themselves in Antigonish County, Nova Scotia. These were soon joined by hundreds more Roman Catholics from the Western Isles in 1801 and 1802. On Prince Edward Island, MacDonald of Glenaladale attempted to enforce what he thought were his feudal rights, and newly arrived settlers were encouraged only to be tenants on his lands. However, once the more adventurous settlers got their bearings, many moved out of Scotchfort into better areas of the island, squatting upon those lands. In time, Scotchfort became not a place for permanent settlement but a place for the newly arrived to get their bearings and move out to acquire lands of their own.

== Clan profile ==
Heraldic standard of the current clan chief.

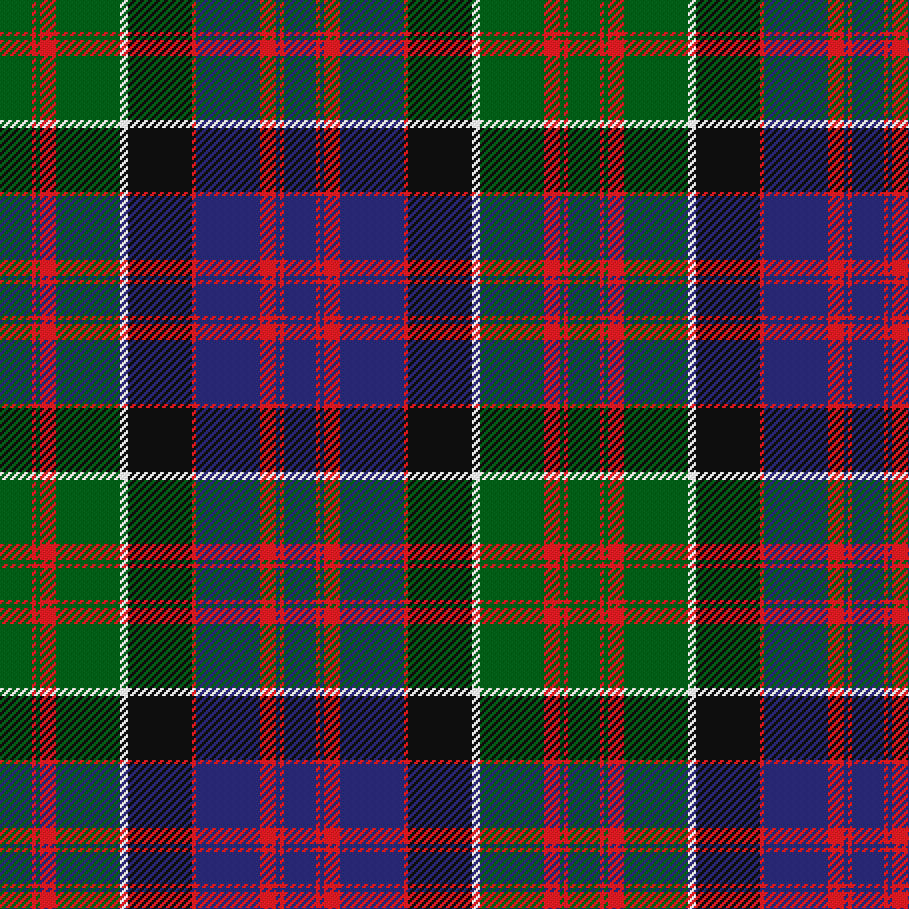
Registered tartan of MacDonald of Clanranald.

- Clan chief: Traditionally the chiefs of Clan Macdonald of Clanranald have been styled as the Captain of Clanranald. The Highland or Gaelic designation of the chiefs of the clan is Mac Mhic Ailein. The current chief of the clan is Ranald Alexander Macdonald of Clanranald, who is the 24th Chief and Captain of Clanranald. The current chief's sloinneadh or pedigree is Ragnhaill Alasdair mac Coinneach Alasdair mhic Tearlach 'ic Raibheart 'ic Raibheart 'ic Cailein 'ic Alasdair 'ic Domhnaill 'ic Ragnhaill Og 'ic Ragnhaill 'ic Ailein 'ic Iain Muideartach 'ic Alasdair 'ic Ailein 'ic Ruairidh 'ic Ailein 'ic Ragnhaill 'ic Eoin 'ic Aonghais Og 'ic Aonghais Mhor 'ic Domhnaill 'ic Ragnhaill 'ic Somhairle.
- Chiefly arms: The current chief's coat of arms is blazoned: quarterly, 1st, argent, a lion rampant gules, armed Or; 2nd, Or, a dexter hand couped in fess holding a cross-crosslet fitchee in pale all gules; 3rd, Or, a lymphad her oars saltireways sable, and in base undy vert a salmon naiant argent; 4th, argent, an oak tree vert surmounted of an eagle displayed Or. Above the shield is placed a chapeau azure furred ermine and theron an helm befitting his degree with a mantling gules doubled Or, and on a wreath of these liveries argent and gules is set for crest a triple-towered castle argent, masoned sable and issuing from the centre tower a dexter arm in armour embowed grasping a sword all proper, and in an Escrol over the same this motto "my hope is constant in thee". On a compartment whereon is this word "dh'aindeoin co theireadhe e" are placed for Supporters two bears each having two arrows pierced through his body all proper. The chief's heraldic standard is blazoned: the arms of Macdonald of Clanranald in the hoist and of two tracts argent and gules, upon which is depicted the crest in the first and second compartments, and two sprigs of common heather in the third compartment, along with the motto "dh' aindeòin cò theireadh e'" in letters gules upon two transverse bands argent. The chief's slogan of dh' aindeòin cò theireadh e has been translated from Scottish Gaelic as "gainsay who dare", and "in spite of all opposition".
- Clan member's crest badge: The crest badge suitable for members of the clan contains the chief's heraldic crest and motto. The crest is: A triple-towered castle Argent masoned Sable, and issuing from the centre tower a dexter arm in armour embowed grasping a sword all Proper. The motto is MY HOPE IS CONSTANT IN THEE.
- Clan badge: The clan badge or plant badge attributed to the clan is common heath. This plant is attributed to the other Macdonald clans and some other associated clans such as Clan MacIntyre and the Macqueens of Skye.
- Pipe music: The bagpipe tune Spaidsearachd Mhic Mhic Ailein (translation from Scottish Gaelic: "Clanranald's March") has been attributed to the clan, as well as Failte Clann Raounil and the Cruinneachadh (or Gathering).
- Tartan: A tartan was attributed to the clan in the Sobieski Stuarts' collection of tartans known as the Vestiarium Scoticum, published in 1842. Today the Vestiarium is considered a hoax, yet many of the forged tartans within exist today as clan tartans.

=== Branches of the clan ===
There are several branches of Clan Macdonald of Clanranald; these include the Macdonalds of Glenaladale, the Macdonalds of Kinlochmoidart, the Macdonalds of Belfinlay, the Macdonalds of Boisdale, and also a certain family of Maceachainn/Macdonalds. The Macdonalds of Glenaladale descend from John Og, second son of John Moidartach, 8th of Clanranald. They were known in Gaelic as Clann Mhic Ian Oig. The Macdonalds of Kinlochmoidart descend from John, fourth son of Allan, 8th of Clanranald. The Macdonalds of Belfinlay descend from James, second son of Ranald, 2nd of Benbecula, grandson of Allan, 9th of Clanranald. The Macdonalds of Boisdale descend from Donald of Benbecula, 16th of Clanranald. Following the extinction of the main branch of Clanranald in 1944, the competing claims of the Belfinlay and Boisdale branches to the Captaincy of the Clan were adjudged by the Court of the Lord Lyon in favour of the Boisdale branch in 1957.

Macdonald and Macdonald state that the Macdonalds of Knoydart were considered to descend from Allan, 2nd of Clanranald. Allan gave his son, Allan who was the first of the family, the 60 pennylands of Knoydart. Ranald, 7th of Knoydart was the last of the family to hold the lands of Knoydart. In about 1610, the men of Knoydart raided the lands of Laggan Auchindoun in Glengarry and in consequence of the reprecutions that followed the family eventually lost possession of their lands. Ranald is said to have been murdered by the men of Glengarry at a point which is called Rudha Raonuill.

The 'Maceachen' family of Macdonalds descends from Hector, second son of Roderick, 3rd of Clanranald (see 'MacEachan' sept listed below). Hector was granted by the lord of the isles, the lands of Kilmalew and others in the lordship of Morven. The Maceachens of Howbeg and Glenuig descend from Ranald, son of Hector 5th of Kilmalew. Ranald was the first of this family to occupy lands in Uist. A tack was given to the family by Clanranald in the 17th century. In 1900, Angus and Archibald Macdonald state that there were still members of the family using the patronymic in Arisaig and Uist, though the gentlemen of the family assumed the surname Macdonald by the 18th century. The Macdonalds of Morar descend from Allan, eldest son of Dougall, 6th of Clanranald. In 1538, Allan and his brother Lachlan were granted the 14 merklands of Morar.

=== Associated families or septs ===
The following is a list of names associated with Clan MacDonald of Clanranald. For the family/surname to be associated with the clan the name/family must be related to clan or to have been located on the traditional Clanranald lands.

Names	Notes
Allan, Burke	Allan is descended from Allan son of Allanson from the West Highlands which allied themselves with Clanranald and were known to be skilled and noble warriors. Only Burkes originally from Antrim that went to the Clanranald estates of Uist and Benbecula.
Lynn	Only those from South Uist and Benbecula. They derive their name from the Gaelic O'Fhloinn or O'Loinn. These Lynns and Burkes went to the Clanranald estates in the train of Fionnsgoth Burke, bride of Ranald Mor, 1st of Benbecula.
MacCellach, MacCulloch (must be Mac Cellaigh), MacKelloch, Kelly (must be Mac Cellaigh).	Only those from the West Highlands and Hebrides which allied themselves with Clanranald. Their name is from Mac Cellaigh.
MacCormick	Only those who went to South Uist from Ireland in the 18th century as missionaries.
MacCuithein, MacKeithan, MacWhithee, MacQueen (must be Mac Cuithein or MacCuinn; see note).	The MacQueens of Benbecula and South Uist are associated with Clanranald and Clan Donald North. They were originally MacCuitheins from Skye (Clann ic Cuithein), not MacQueens from Skye. Today the usual American spelling of this name is MacKeithan.
MacDougall	There is only one family of MacDougalls associated with the Clanranald—and it is from North Uist. All other MacDougalls are of Clan MacDougall. The Clanranald MacDougalls derived their name from Dugald, son of Ranald, 1st of Clanranald.
MacEachan, MacGachen, MacGeachie, McGeachie, MacKeachan, MacKechnie, MacKichan, MacAichan, McGechan, McGechaen.	Those of West Highlands and Islands may be associated with Clanranald, except those from Islay and Kintyre who are associated with Clan Donald South. Note that there are other MacEachans associated with Clan Maclean, and descend from a Maclean chief of that clan. There are also other MacEachans who are really MacEacherns. The Clanranald MacEachans are traditionally thought to derive their name from Hector, 2nd son of Roderick, 3rd of Clanranald.
MacGillies, Gillies, Gillis, Gill (must be Mac Gille Iosa).	Only those from Morar are associated with Clanranald.
MacGorrie, Currie/Curry/McCurry/Godfrey/Jeffrey (must be Mac Goraidh; see note).	Only those from Benbecula and South Uist are associated with Clanranald. Only those from Benbecula and North Uist are associated with Clan Donald North. Note that most of the West Highland and Hebridean names of Currie/Curry/McCurry may be Mac Mhuirich, see 'MacMhuirich' below).
MacGowan, Gowan (must be Mac a ghobhainn; see note), Smith (see note).	Only those from the West Highlands and Islands are associated with Clan Donald North, Clanranald and Clan Donald South. Their name is from Mac a ghobhainn ("son of the smith"). There is only one Smith family associated with Clan Donald and it is found on South Uist.
MacIllimhicall, MacMichael, MacMitchell, Michael/Michaelson/Mitchell/Mitchelson/Carmichael] (must be Mac Gille Mhicheil; from Clanranald lands; see note).	Only those from Clanranald lands are associated with Clanranald. Only those from Islay and Kintyre are associated with Clan Donald South. Their name is from Mac Gille Mhicheil ("son of the servant of St. Michael").
Main article: Clan MacInnes MacInnes, MacGinnis	Only those from the West Highlands and Hebrides are associated with Clanranald, MacDonnell of Glengarry, Clan Donald North and South.
Main article: Clan MacIntyre MacIntyre, MacEntire, Wright (must be Mac an t-saoir).	The family is said to be of the same stock as Clan Donald. Associated with Clanranald, MacDonnell of Glengarry, Clan Donald North and South. Their name is from Mac an t-saoir ("son of the carpenter").
MacIsaac, MacKessock, Isaacson/Kessock (must be Mac Iosaig; from Clanranald lands).	Those associated with Clan Donald were originally from Moidart. Their name is from Mac Iosaig. Those from South Uist are associated with Clanranald; from North Uist are associated with Clan Donald North; those from Islay and Kintyre are associated with Clan Donald South.
MacLellan, MacClellan, MacGillelan, Gililan (must be Mac Gille Fhaolain and from Morar).	Only those from South Morar and South Uist are associated with Clanranald. Those from North Morar are associated with the MacDonnells of Glengarry; those from Islay and Kintyre with Clan Donald South; those from North Uist with Clan Donald North.
MacLulich, MacCulloch (must be Mac Lulaich).	Only those from the West Highlands, Hebrides and Antrim may be associated with Clan Donald South, Clanranald, and Clan Donald North. They derive their name from Mac Lulaich ("son of Lulach"). There is no relationship with those from Eastern Ross.
MacManechin, Monk (must be Mac Manach).	Only those from Benbecula are associated with Clan Donald North and Clanranald. Those from North Uist are associated with Clan Donald North. Their name is from Mac Manach ("son of the monk").
Main article: MacMhuirich bardic family MacMhuirich, MacBurie, MacMurrich, MacVurrich, MacWurie, Currie/Curry/MacCurry (must be Mac Mhuirich).	The name is found throughout Clanranald however it is also associated with Clan Donald South in Islay, Kintyre, Jura and Antrim. The family descends from the hereditary bards to the Lord of the Isles and later to Clanranald. Note that most of the West Highland and Island names Currie/Curry/McCurry may be of this group, however others are actually derived from Mac Goraidh (see 'MacGorrie' above).
MacQuilly	Those from Eigg are associated with Clanranald. Their name is derived from Mac Choiligh ("son of the cock").
MacRuairi, MacRory, MacRury MacCrory, Rorieson, Rory (must be Mac Ruairidh).	Those from the West Highlands and Islands are associated with Clanranald, Clan Donald South and Clan Donald North.
MacVarish, MacWarish, MacMoris (only those from Moidart).	Only those from Moidart. Their name is derived from Mac Bharrais.
Park	Only Parks from the West Highlands and Islands or Antrim which were originally Chlann ic Phairce are connected with Clan Donald. According to Clan Donald USA Inc., only about 1 in 20 Parks may have a connection with Clan Donald. Only those from South Uist are associated with Clanranald.

== See also ==
- Books of Clanranald, 18th-century writings of MacMhuirich bards
- Lord of Clanranald, a title in the Jacobite Peerage
- The Clanranald Trust for Scotland, a reenactment and entertainment organisation

== Bibliography ==
- Bain, Robert (1983). MacDougall, Margaret O (ed.). The Clans and Tartans of Scotland. Heraldic advisor Stewart-Blacker, P. E. Glasgow: Collins. ISBN 0-00-411117-6.
- Brown, Michael (2004). The Wars of Scotland, 1214–1371 (illustrated ed.). Edinburgh University Press. ISBN 0-7486-1238-6.
- Campey, Lucille H (2007). After the Hector: The Scottish Pioneers of Nova Scotia and Cape Breton 1773–1852 (2nd ed.). Toronto: National Heritage Books. ISBN 978-1-55002-770-9.
- Campey, Lucille H (2008). An Unstoppable Force: The Scottish Exodus to Canada. Toronto: National Heritage Books. ISBN 978-1-55002-811-9.
- Duffy, Seán, ed. (2007). The World of the Galloglass: War and Society in the North Sea Region, 1150–1600. Dublin: Four Courts Press. ISBN 978-1-85182-946-0.
- Eyre-Todd, George (1923). The Highland clans of Scotland; their History and Traditions. Vol. 1. New York: D. Appleton.
- Eyre-Todd, George (1923). The Highland clans of Scotland; their History and Traditions. Vol. 2. New York: D. Appleton.
- Macdonald, Angus; Macdonald, Archibald (1900). The Clan Donald. Vol. 2. Inverness: The Northern Counties Publishing Company, Ltd.
- Macdonald, Angus; Macdonald, Archibald (1900). The Clan Donald. Vol. 3. Inverness: The Northern Counties Publishing Company, Ltd.
- MacKay, Donald (1996). Scotland farewell: The people of the Hector (3, illustrated ed.). Dundurn Press Ltd. ISBN 1-896219-12-8.
- Mackenzie, Alexander (1881). The Macdonalds of Clanranald. A. & W. Mackenzie.
- Reid, Stuart (2006). The Scottish Jacobite Army 1745–46. Elite series #149. Osprey Publishing. ISBN 1-84603-073-0.
- Roberts, John Leonard (1999). Feuds, Forays and Rebellions: History of the Highland Clans, 1475–1625. Edinburgh University Press. ISBN 0-7486-6244-8.
- Roberts, John Leonard (2002). The Jacobite Wars: Scotland and the Military Campaigns of 1715 and 1745. Edinburgh: Edinburgh University Press. ISBN 1-902930-29-0.
- Stewart, Donald Calder; Thompson, J. Charles (1980). Scarlett, James (ed.). Scotland's Forged Tartans. Edinburgh: Paul Harris Publishing. ISBN 0-904505-67-7.
- Way, George; Squire, Romilly (2000). Clans & Tartans. Glasgow: HarperCollins. ISBN 0-00-472501-8.
- Mac an Tàilleir, Iain. "Ainmean Pearsanta" (docx). Sabhal Mòr Ostaig.
