= John Mackenzie (1806–1848) =

Scottish scholar of Gaelic literature

John Mackenzie (1806–1848) was a 19th-century Scottish literary scholar of the Scottish Gaelic language and its literature.

== Life ==
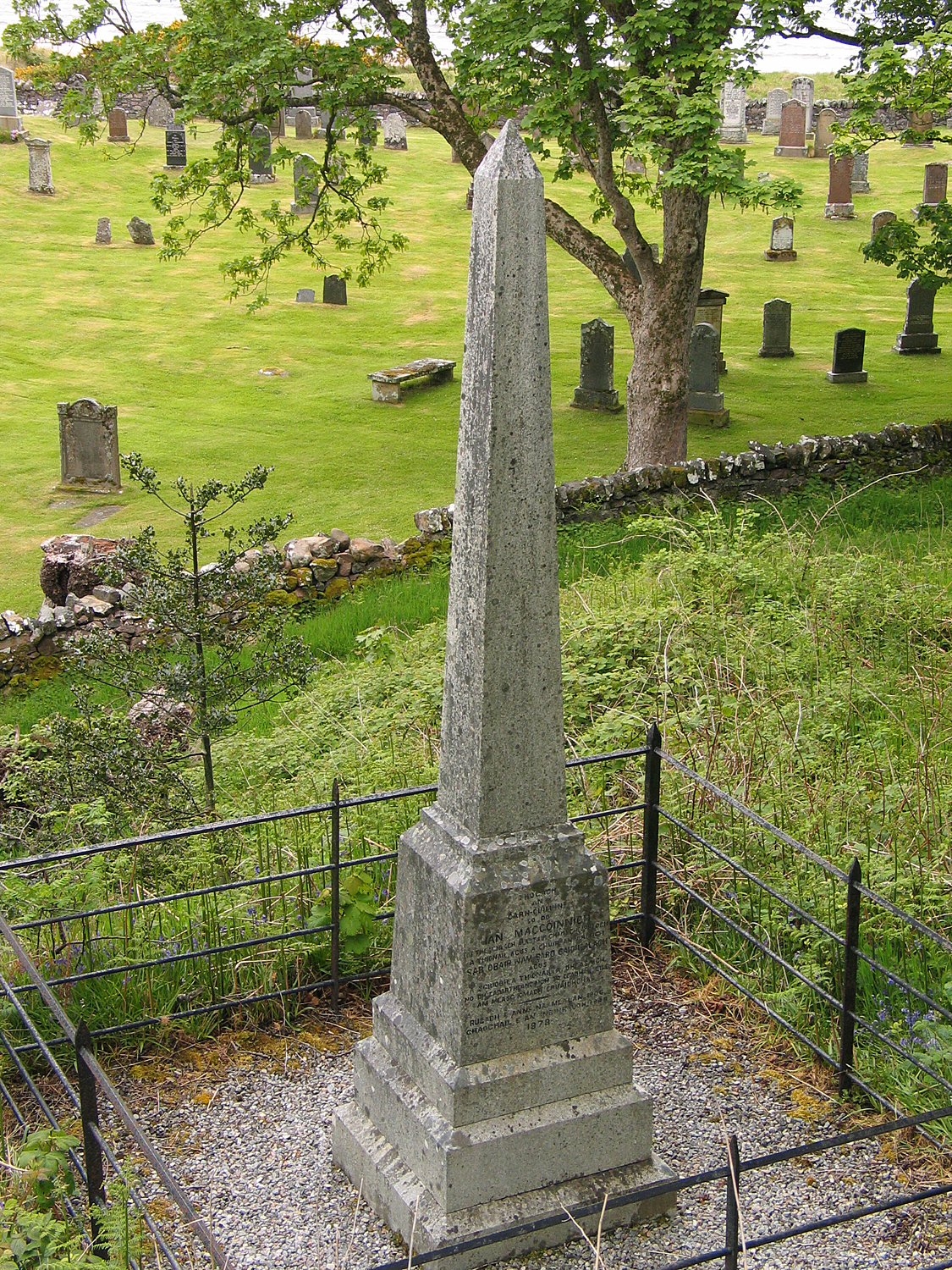
1878 Memorial to John Mackenzie, outside Gairloch Burial Ground

He was born on 17 July 1806 in the parish of Gairloch, Ross-shire, and was the son of Alexander Mackenzie who rented some land on the north side of Loch Ewe. Despite being descended from the Scottish nobility, the family had come down in the world. He left the parish school of Gairloch at an early age, and was apprenticed to an itinerant carpenter and joiner. An accident at work compelled him to return to Gairloch.

In 1833 Mackenzie went to Glasgow, pursuing publishing projects. In 1836 he was appointed a book-keeper in the Glasgow University printing-office. He then worked for the Edinburgh publisher Maclachlan & Stewart.

Mackenzie died at Poolewe on 19 August 1848. A monument outside the Gairloch Burial Ground was erected by public subscription in 1878.

== Works ==
Mackenzie's major work was Sar-obair nam bard Gaelach, an anthology of Scottish Gaelic poetry that he sold to a Glasgow publisher. It appeared in 1841, with the English title The Beauties of Gaelic Poetry. It contained biographies in English of 36 Scottish Gaelic authors (a few fictitious), and an introduction, also in English, by James Logan. It followed his 1830 edition at Inverness of the poems of Uilleam Ros (second edition Glasgow, 1834). He did editorial work on Cuaitear nan Gleann, the Gaelic magazine.

Mackenzie's original poetry is minor. His other work was mainly for Maclachlan & Stewart, where he translated from English or edited about 30 different Gaelic works, including:

- religious works by Richard Baxter, John Bunyan, William Dyer and William Guthrie;
- English-Gaelic section of Neil MacAlpine's Gaelic Dictionary;
- an edition of Duncan Ban MacIntyre's poems; and
- in 1844, a Gaelic history of the Young Pretender, and a collection of Gaelic Jacobite songs.
