= Tacksman =

Landholder of intermediate status in Scottish Highland society

A tacksman (Scottish Gaelic: Fear-Taic, meaning "supporting man"; most common Scots spelling: takisman) was a landholder of intermediate legal and social status in Scottish Highland society.

== Tenant and landlord ==
Although a tacksman generally paid a yearly rent for the land let to him (his "tack"), his tenure might last for several generations. He would often be related to his landlord and might, for example, represent a cadet branch of the family of the clan chief. The tacksman in turn would let out his land to sub-tenants, but he might keep some in hand himself. Samuel Johnson defined the class in this manner:

Next in dignity to the laird is the Tacksman; a large taker or lease-holder of land, of which he keeps part as a domain in his own hand, and lets part to under-tenants. The tacksman is necessarily a man capable of securing to the laird the whole rent, and is commonly a collateral relation. These tacks, or subordinate possessions, were long considered as hereditary, and the occupant was distinguished by the name of the place at which he resided. He held a middle station, by which the highest and the lowest orders were connected. He paid rent and reverence to the laird, and received them from the tenants. This tenure still subsists, with its original operation, but not with its primitive stability.

The three fundamental obligations traditionally imposed on tacksmen were grassum (a premium payable on entering into a lease), rental (either in kind, or in money, which was designated "tack-duty"), and the rendering of military service.

== Inheritance ==
As described by James Mitchell:

A certain portion of the best of the land [the chief] retained as his own appanage, and it was cultivated for his sole profit. The rest was divided by grants of a nature more or less temporary, among the second class of the clan, who are called tenants, tacksmen, or goodmen. These were the near relations of the chief, or were descended from those who bore such relation to some of his ancestors. To each of these brothers, nephews, cousins, and so forth, the chief assigned a portion of land, either during pleasure, or frequently in the form of a pledge, redeemable for a certain sum of money. These small portions of land, assisted by the liberality of their relations, the tacksmen contrived to stock, and on these they subsisted, until, in a generation or two, the lands were resumed, for portioning out some nearer relative, and the descendants of the original tacksman sunk into the situation of commoners. This was such an ordinary transition, that the third class, consisting of the common people, was strengthened in the principle on which their clanish obedience depended, namely, the belief in their original connexion with the genealogy of the chief, since each generation saw a certain number of families merge among the commoners, whom their fathers had ranked among the tacksmen, or nobility of the clan. This change, though frequent, did not uniformly take place. In the case of a very powerful chief, or of one who had an especial affection for a son or brother, a portion of land was assigned to a cadet in perpetuity; or he was perhaps settled in an appanage conquered from some other clan, or the tacksman acquired wealth and property by marriage, or by some exertion of his own. In all these cases he kept his rank in society, and usually had under his government a branch, or subdivision of the tribe, who looked up to him as their immediate leader, and whom he governed with the same authority, and in the same manner in all respects, as the chief, who was the patriarchal head of the whole sept.

This system began to break down by the early 18th century. In 1737, Archibald Campbell, 3rd Duke of Argyll decreed that tacks were to be let out to the highest bidder rather than being given to a tacksman with family connections; consequently many of the older sort of tacksmen were dispossessed. Because they mustered the tenants, acted as officers and functioned as shock troops in time of war, Argyll had inadvertently weakened his military position and that of the Hanoverians in the 1745 Jacobite Rising.

However, his rival Donald Cameron of Lochiel maintained the old arrangements with tacksmen. As a consequence the Camerons—who sided with the Jacobites—possessed an enhanced potential to take a military initiative.

== Reputation ==
The tacksman’s reputation was an ambiguous one. To some, he appeared to be no more than a parasitic middleman, but Dr Johnson mounted a stout defence:

To banish the tacksman is easy, to make a country plentiful by diminishing the people, is an expeditious mode of husbandry; but that abundance, which there is nobody to enjoy, contributes little to human happiness. As the mind must govern the hands, so in every society the man of intelligence must direct the man of labour. If the tacksman be taken away, the Hebrides must in their present state be given up to grossness and ignorance; the tenant, for want of instruction, will be unskilful, and for want of admonition, will be negligent. The laird, in these wide estates, which often consist of islands remote from one another, cannot extend his personal influence to all his tenants; and the steward having no dignity annexed to his character, can have little authority among men taught to pay reverence only to birth, and who regard the tacksman as their hereditary superior; nor can the steward have equal zeal for the prosperity of an estate profitable only to the laird, with the tacksman, who has the laird's income involved in his own. The only gentlemen in the islands are the lairds, the tacksmen, and the ministers, who frequently improve their livings by becoming farmers. If the tacksman be banished, who will be left to impart knowledge, or impress civility?

== Decline ==
The class of tacksmen was most prominent in the 17th and 18th centuries. The Highland Clearances destroyed the tacksman system – perhaps more thoroughly than they did the crofters – and many tacksmen emigrated to the New World.

== Notable tacksmen ==
- Flora MacDonald was a notable and characteristic member of the tacksman class. She was the daughter of Ranald MacDonald, who held the tack of Milton in South Uist from the chief of Clanranald, and she married Allan MacDonald, who held the tack of Kingsburgh from the Chief of Clan MacDonald of Sleat. She and her husband emigrated to North Carolina in 1773. After siding with King George III of Great Britain during the American War of Independence, Flora and her husband were forced to move, first to Nova Scotia, and then back to Scotland. She had numerous sons.
- Aonghas Beag MacDonald, the older brother of the Scottish Gaelic Bard Alasdair mac Mhaighstir Alasdair, held the tack of Dalilea from the Chief of Clanranald.
