= Hutchison (surname) =

Hutchison is a surname, and may refer to:

== A ==
- Alexander Hutchison (1943–2015), Scottish poet
- Alexander Hutchison (1838–1917), Australian politician, member of the New South Wales Legislative Assembly for Canterbury 1887–1891
- Alexander Hutchison (1838–1908), Australian politician, member of the New South Wales Legislative Assembly for Glen Innes 1889–1894
- Alexander Copland Hutchison (1786–1840), British surgeon
- Alexander Cowper Hutchison (1838–1922), Canadian architect
- Alexander Richard Hamilton Hutchison (1871–1930), British general
- Alex Hutchison (1864–1928), Scottish trade union leader
- Alice Hutchison (1874–1953), British physician in World War I
- Ambrose K. Hutchison (1856–1932), Hawaiian resident leader of the leper settlement of Kalaupapa
- Amy Jo Hutchison, American economic justice advocate
- Andrew Hutchison (born 1938), Primate of the Anglican Church of Canada
- Anna Hutchison (born 1986), New Zealand actress
- Anna May Hutchison (1925–1998), American baseball player
- Anthony Hutchison (born 1961), American football player

== B ==
- Balfour Hutchison (1889–1967), Lieutenant-General in the British Army, younger brother of Robert Hutchison
- Barry Hutchison, Scottish children's author, screenwriter and director
- Bill Hutchison (William Henry Hutchison, 1923–1982), Australian rules footballer
- Bill Hutchison (baseball) (William Forrest Hutchison, 1859–1926), American baseball pitcher
- Brian Hutchison, American actor
- Bruce Hutchison (1901–1992), Canadian author and journalist

== C ==
- Cailey Hutchison, American ice hockey player
- Cammy Hutchison (born 1998), Scottish rugby union footballer
- Chandler Hutchison (born 1996), American basketball player
- Charles Hutchison (1879–1949), American film actor, director and screenwriter
- Charles Francis Hutchison (1879–c.1940), surveyor and scholar in the British Gold Coast
- Charles W. Hutchison (1865–1945), American politician from Wisconsin
- Charlie Hutchison (1918–1993), British-Ghanaian soldier
- Charlie Hutchison (swimmer) (born 2003), Scottish swimmer
- Chris Hutchison, American actor and director
- Chuck Hutchison (born 1948), American football player
- Claude B. Hutchison (1885–1980), American botanist and educator
- Clyde A. Hutchison Jr. (1913–2005), American chemist
- Clyde A. Hutchison III (born 1938), American biochemist and microbiologist
- Colleen Hutchison (born 1934), Australian politician
- Craig Hutchison (broadcaster) (born 1974), Australian sports broadcaster
- Craig Hutchison (swimmer) (born 1975), Canadian freestyle swimmer

== D ==
- Dan Hutchison, American attorney and politician from New Jersey
- Dave Hutchison (footballer) (1870–1956), Australian rules footballer
- Dave Hutchison (ice hockey) (born 1952), Canadian ice hockey player
- David Hutchison (born 1976), American football coach and player
- David E. Hutchison (born 1943), member of the Wisconsin State Assembly
- David William Hutchison (1908–1982), general in the United States Air Force
- Deborah Hutchison, American entrepreneur, author and filmmaker
- Don Hutchison (born 1971), English football player
- Dorris J. Hutchison (1918–2007), American research oncologist
- Doug Hutchison (born 1960), American actor
- Drew Hutchison (baseball) (born 1990), American baseball player
- Drew Hutchison (rugby league) (born 1995), Australian rugby player
- Duncan Hutchison (1904–1973), Scottish footballer
- Dylan Hutchison (born 1994), American stock car racing driver

== E ==
- Elizabeth McCreight Hutchison (1901–1986), American educator
- Elvin Hutchison (1912–2001), American football player, coach and official

== F ==
- Ferdinand William Hutchison (1819–1893), British physician and politician in the Kingdom of Hawaii
- Finlay Hutchison (born 2000), British racing driver
- Fiona Hutchison (born 1960), British-American actress
- Florence Hutchison-Stirling (1858–1948), Scottish chess player
- Frank Hutchison (1897–1945), American blues musician and songwriter
- Frank Hutchison (cricketer) (1897–1990), New Zealand sportsman

== G ==
- Gennifer Hutchison (born 1976/7), American television and film writer
- Geoff Hutchison, Australian journalist
- George Hutchison (New Zealand politician) (1846–1930), New Zealand politician from Taranaki
- George Hutchison (mayor) (1882–1947), Mayor of Auckland, New Zealand from 1931 to 1935
- George Hutchison (British politician) (1873–1928), Scottish Member of Parliament for Midlothian and Peebles Northern
- George Hutchison (moderator) (1818–1894), Scottish minister
- Graham Seton Hutchison (1890–1946), British army officer, military theorist and author
- Grant Hutchison (born 1984), Scottish drummer and percussionist
- Greg Hutchison (born 1957), Australian rules footballer
- Gus Hutchison (born 1937), Formula-One driver

== H ==
- Henry Hutchison (born 1997), Australian rugby union footballer
- Hugh Hutchison (born 1964), British freestyle skier

== I ==
- Ian Clark Hutchison (1903–2002), Member of Parliament for Edinburgh West
- Isobel Wylie Hutchison (1889–1982) was a Scottish Arctic traveller, filmmaker and botanist

== J ==
- James Hutchison (American politician) (born 1942), former mayor of Dover, Delaware, from 1994 to 2004
- James Hutchison (Australian politician) (1859–1909), member of the Australian Federal House of Representatives
- Sir James Hutchison, 1st Baronet (1893–1979), British Army officer and politician
- Jane Denio Hutchison (1871–1942), president of the Tri County Federation of Women's Clubs
- James Holmes Hutchison (1912–1987), British professor of child health
- Jane Campbell Hutchison (1932–2020), American art historian
- Jill Hutchison (born 1945), American women's basketball coach
- Jock Hutchison (John Waters Hutchison, 1884–1977), Scottish-American golfer
- John Hutchison (mayor) (1817–1863), mayor of Toronto
- John Hutchison (sculptor) (1832–1910), Scottish sculptor
- John Duflon Hutchison (fl.1860s), British merchant
- John Hutchison (architect) (1841–1908), Scottish architect
- John de Mestre Hutchison (1862–1932), Royal Navy officer
- John A. Hutchison, American judge

== K ==
- Kathleen Hutchison, British television producer
- Kay Bailey Hutchison (born 1943), United States senator
- Ken Hutchison (1948–2021), Scottish actor
- Kieren Hutchison (born 1974), New Zealand actor

== L ==
- Lynne Hutchison (born 1994), British rhythmic gymnast

== M ==
- Mark Hutchison (born 1963), Nevada State Senator and Lieutenant Governor of Nevada
- Mary Hutchison (1915–1994), National President of the Scottish Co-operative Women's Guild
- Mavis Hutchison (1924–2022), South African athlete
- Melissa Hutchison, American voice actress
- Michael Hutchison (politician) (1914–1993), Scottish politician
- Michael Hutchison (priest) (1844–1921), Scottish priest
- Michael Hutchison (judge), British lawyer and judge
- Michele Hutchison (born 1972), British writer and translator
- Miller Reese Hutchison (1876–1944), American electrical engineer and inventor
- Muriel Hutchison (1915–1975), American actress

== N ==
- Neil Hutchison (died 2010), British-Australian radio and television executive

== P ==
- Patrick Hutchison (1741–1802), Presbyterian minister
- Paul Hutchison (politician) (born 1947), New Zealand politician
- Paul Hutchison (English cricketer) (born 1977), English cricketer
- Paul Hutchison (Australian cricketer) (1968–2015), Australian cricketer
- Peter Hutchison (1935–2019), British public official, businessman and botanist

== R ==
- Ralph Cooper Hutchison (1898–1966), American college president
- Randy Hutchison (born 1948), American NASCAR driver
- Ray Hutchison (cricketer) (born 1944), New Zealand cricketer and umpire
- Ray Hutchison (politician) (1932–2014), member of the Texas House of Representatives
- Richard Hutchison (1812–1891), New Brunswick businessman and political figure
- Robert Hutchison of Carlowrie (1834–1894), Scottish landowner and photographer
- Robert Hutchison, 1st Baron Hutchison of Montrose (1873–1950), Scottish soldier, politician and peer
- Sir Robert Hutchison, 1st Baronet (1871–1960), Scottish physician and writer
- Robert Gemmell Hutchison (1855–1936), Scottish landscape artist
- Robert Hutchison (mayor) (1828–1863), businessman and politician in Cape Coast
- Robert Hutchison (meteoriticist) (died 2007), British scientist and curator
- Ron Hutchison, Canadian wrestler, trainer and promoter
- Ruby Hutchison (1892–1974), Australian politician
- Russell Hutchison (born 1978), American soccer player

== S ==
- Scott Hutchison (1981–2018), Scottish musician
- Sidney Hutchison (1912–2000), British art historian
- Susan Hutchison (born 1954) is an American television news journalist and politician

== T ==
- Terence Wilmot Hutchison (1912–2007), British economist
- Thomas Hutchinson (governor) (1711–1780), colonial Governor of Massachusetts
- Thomas Hutchison (politician) (1866–1925), Scottish landowner and politician
- Thomas Setzer Hutchison (1875–1936), American military officer
- Tom Hutchison (golfer) (1877–1900), Scottish golfer
- Tommy Hutchison (born 1947), Scottish football player and manager
- Tracee Hutchison, Australian writer and broadcaster

== W ==
- William Hutchison (New Zealand politician) (1820–1905), member of the New Zealand House of Representatives and mayor of Wellington
- William Hutchison (pastoralist) (1841–1914), horse breeder and pastoralist in South Australia
- William H. Hutchison (1843–1919), mill owner and political figure in Ontario
- William Hutchison (MP for Glasgow Kelvingrove) (1870–1924), Member of Parliament for Glasgow Kelvingrove, 1922–1924
- William Ramsay Hutchison (1889–1918), Scottish rugby union player
- William Oliphant Hutchison (1889–1970), artist, president of the Royal Scottish Academy
- William Hutchison (MP for Romford) (1904–1975), actor and Member of Parliament for Romford, 1931–1935
- Willie Hutchison (1944–2005), American singer

== See also ==
- Hutchinson (surname)
- Hutcherson
