= Robert Howie Fisher =

Scottish minister

Robert Howie Fisher (1861–1934) was a Scottish minister in the 19th century who became Chaplain in Ordinary to King George V in Scotland from 1913.

== Life ==
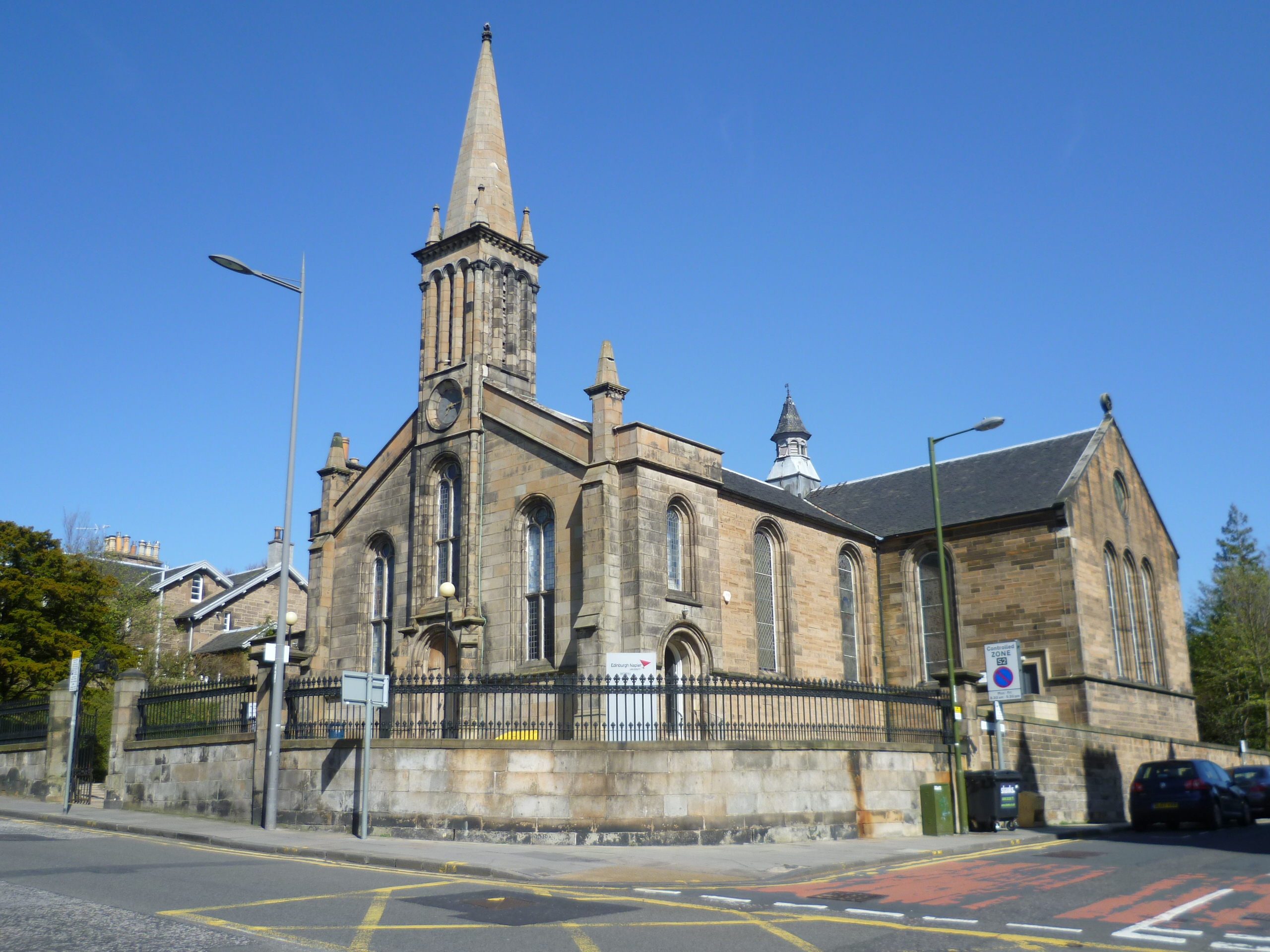
Morningside Parish Church, Edinburgh

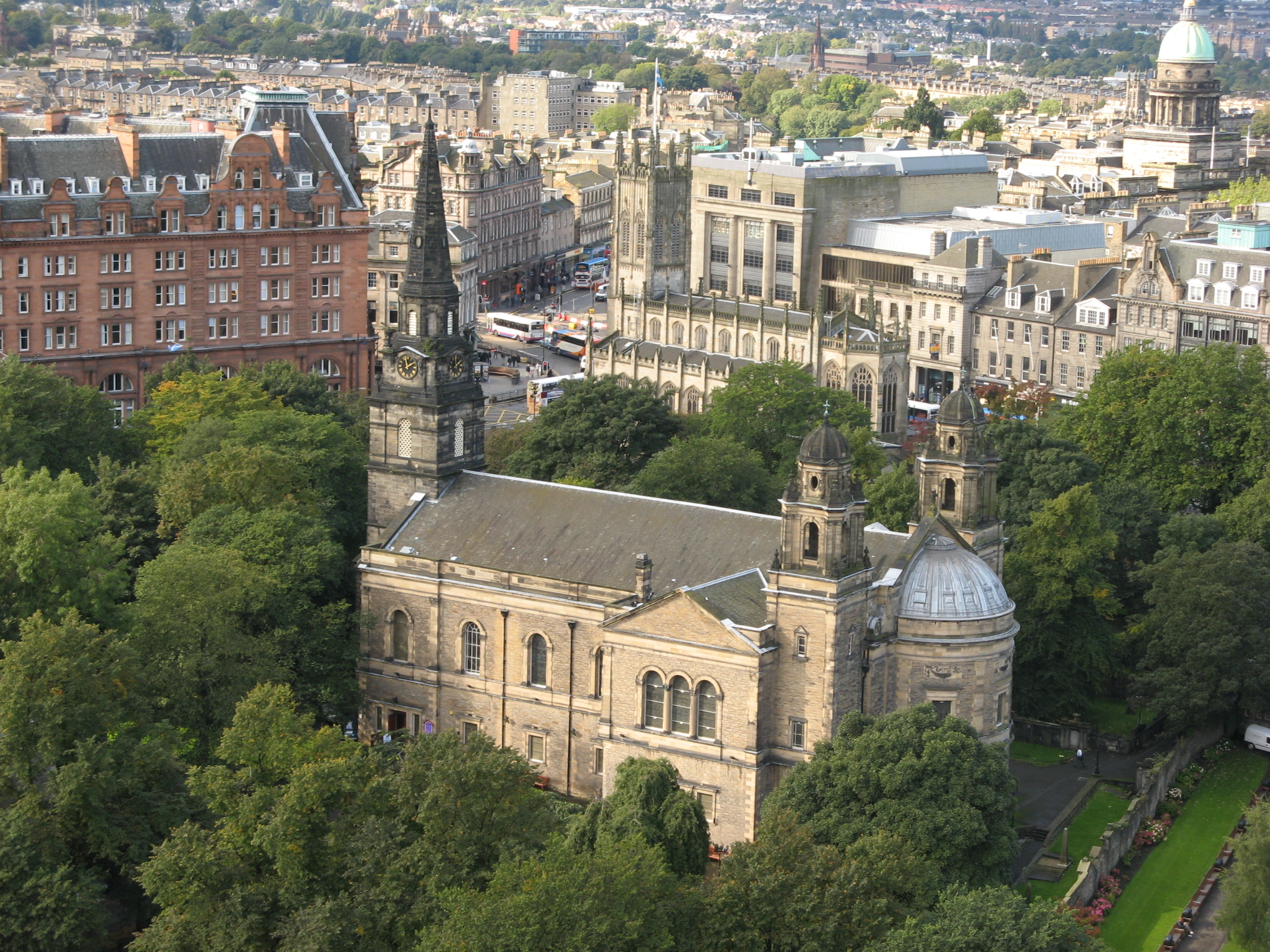
St Cuthbert's Church in Edinburgh

He was born on 27 April 1861 the son of Rev Matthew Fisher, minister of Cross and Burness parish on the isle of Sanday, Orkney. He was educated at George Watson's School in Edinburgh. He took a general degree at the University of Edinburgh graduating with an MA in 1880, then a degree in Divinity graduating with a BD in 1884. He was licensed to preach as a minister of the Church of Scotland by the Presbytery of Edinburgh in May 1884.

His first post was as assistant in St Bernard's Church in Stockbridge, Edinburgh. He was ordained as minister of Skelmorlie in August 1885. He translated to Jedburgh Parish church in November 1890 and in 1896 moved to West Church (the Kirk of St Nicholas), Aberdeen. In October 1900 he translated to Morningside Parish Church in Edinburgh. In 1905 he was living in Morningside Manse on Morningside Park, west of the church.

The University of Edinburgh awarded him an honorary Doctor of Divinity (DD) in 1905. In 1913 he was made Chaplain in Ordinary to King George V.

In May 1914 he moved to St Cuthbert's Church, Edinburgh as first minister. Here he was in office until 1925 when he retired and was replaced by Rev George MacLeod.

He died on 2 November 1934. He is buried in Dean Cemetery in the west of the city.

== Family ==
On 26 October 1886, at St Giles' Cathedral, he married Margaret Ada Hutchison (born 10 November 1863, died 15 January 1899), daughter of Robert Hutchison of Carlowrie and sister of Thomas Hutchison, Lord Provost of Leith. They had a son, Matthew George Fisher (born 1888) who became an advocate, and daughters, Mary Tait Fisher (born 1891) and Charlotte Williamina Tait Fisher (born 1895).

In 1906 he married Edith Mary Strathearn, daughter of Robert Strathern, widow of William Percival Lindsay.

== Publications ==
- The Outside of the Inside 1919 (autobiography)
- Religious Experience 1924

Fisher was editor of Life and Work church magazine from 1902 to 1925.

- The Four Gospels (1899)
- The Beatitudes (1912)
- The Outside of the Inside: Reminiscences (1919)
