= Thomas Hutchison =

Thomas Hutchison may refer to:

- Tom Hutchison (golfer) (1877–1900), Scottish golfer
- Tommy Hutchison (born 1947), Scottish footballer and manager
- Thomas Hutchison (politician) (1866–1925), Scottish landowner and politician
- Thomas Setzer Hutchison (1875–1936), American military officer, civil reformer, author and inventor

== See also ==
- Thomas Hutchinson (disambiguation)
- Tim Hutchinson (disambiguation)
