= Mary Casey =

Mary Casey may refer to:

- Mary Ann Casey (born 1949), retired American diplomat, former ambassador to Algeria and Tunisia
- Mary Hutchison (1915–1994), née Casey, national president of the Scottish Co-operative Women's Guild

== Fictional characters ==
- Mary Casey (Neighbours), in the Australian TV soap opera Neighbours, played by Rowena Wallace
