= Eric Hutchison =

Eric Hutchison may refer to:

- Eric William Hutchison, pilot, see AIR-2 Genie
- Eric Hutchison of the Hutchison Baronets

== See also ==
- Eric Hutchinson (disambiguation)
