= Carlowrie Castle =

Castle in Scotland

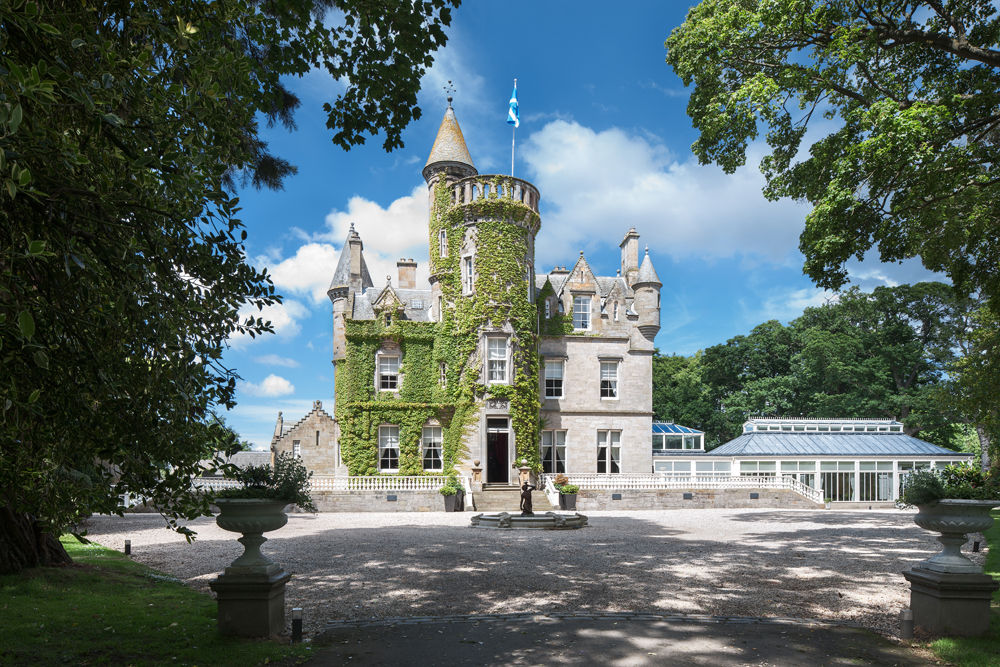
- Carlowrie Castle in 2015
- Interactive map of the Carlowrie Castle area

General information
- Architectural style: Scottish baronial
- Location: Boathouse, Bridge Rd, Kirkliston, Edinburgh EH29 9ES, United Kingdom
- Coordinates: 55°57′20.5″N 3°22′32.6″W
- Construction started: 1852; 174 years ago
- Completed: 1855; 171 years ago

Design and construction
- Architect: David Rhind

Carlowrie Castle was built in the Scottish Baronial style between 1852 and 1855 on the outskirts of Kirkliston, a town approximately 10 miles from Edinburgh, Scotland. It has only ever belonged to two families: the Hutchison family, who built it, and the Marshall family, who acquired it 130 years later.

== Architecture ==
The building has no defensive structures and does not appear in gazetteers of Scottish castles. It was built to the designs of David Rhind the noted Edinburgh architect. Rhind is best known for his commercial and civic building designs and took on very few domestic projects during his lifetime. Carlowrie Castle is therefore rare, as an example of Rhind's more domestic work in the Scots baronial style.

In 1873 Rhind was invited back to Carlowrie to design outhouses and a gate lodge for the castle.

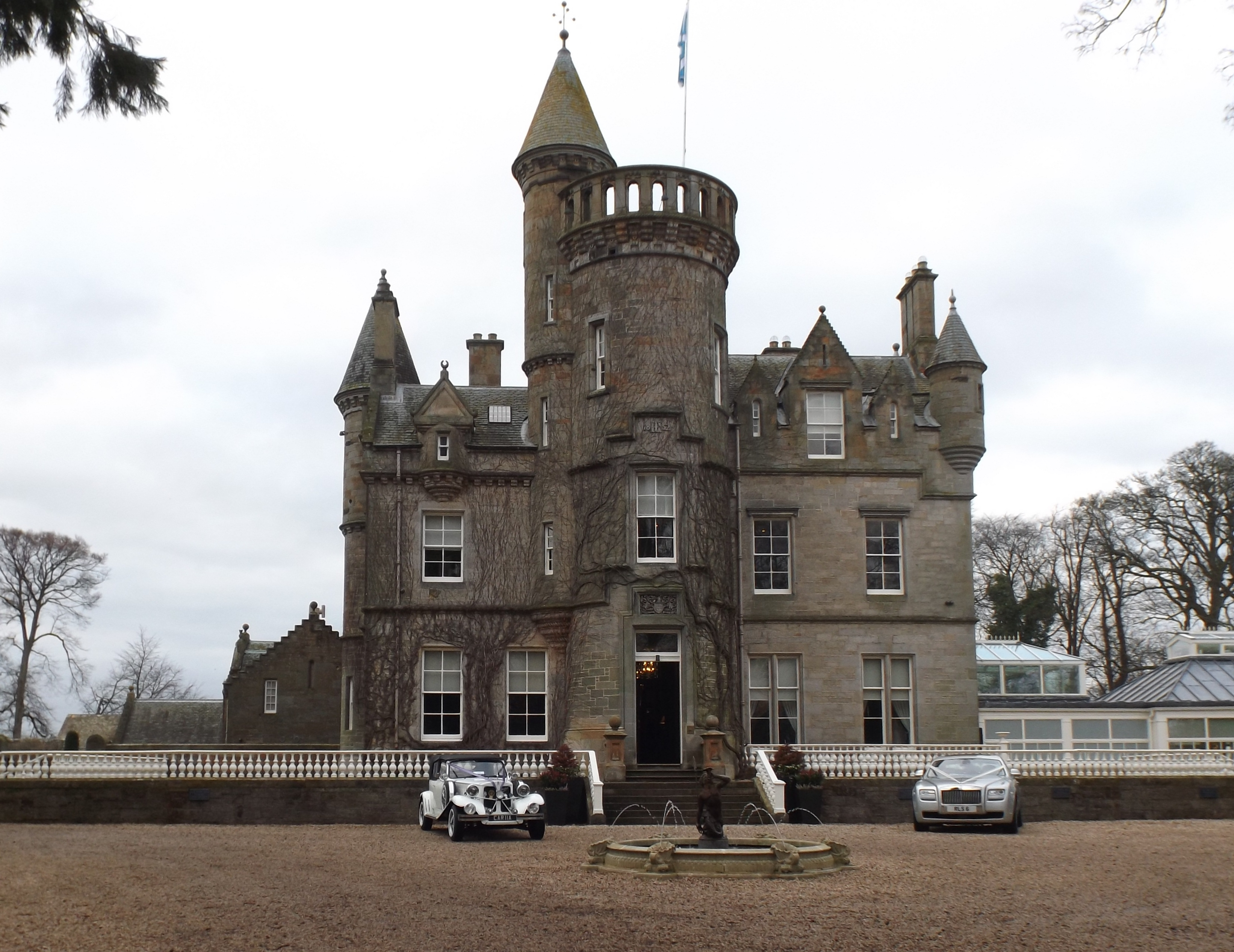
Carlowrie Castle in 2015

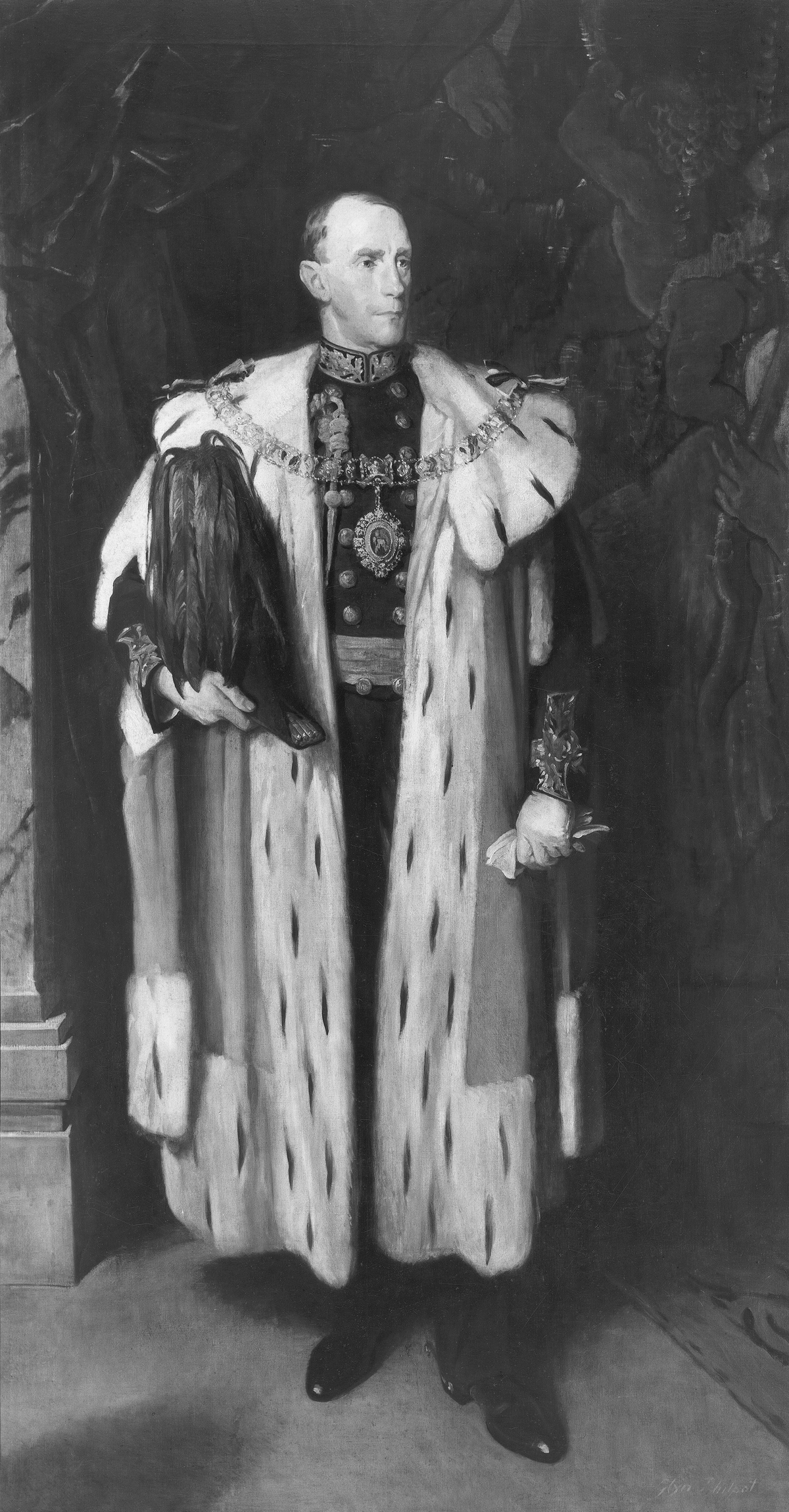
Philpot, Glyn Warren; Sir Thomas Hutchison, Lord Provost of Edinburgh (1921–1923); City of Edinburgh Council

== The Hutchison family ==
Carlowrie Castle was commissioned by Thomas Hutchison, a prosperous wine merchant in Leith and the Provost of Leith. He intended it to be his new family home. Thomas was never to see the castle completed as he died in 1852, leaving his son Robert to complete the project. The castle cost £33,000 to build, a considerable fortune at the time. The house ultimately passed to Robert's eldest son Thomas Hutchison who was later Lord Provost of Edinburgh.

The Hutchisons had long-standing and successful trade connections in the port town of Leith and had risen to prominence as a result of their success. Robert Hutchison, Thomas's heir responsible for completing the castle, was a fellow of the Royal Society of Edinburgh and an expert in arboriculture, leaving the wine trade behind. Two of his sons were knighted for their contributions to the realm: Sir Robert Hutchison, First Baronet of Thurle in Streatly in the County of Berkshire, a respected medical authority and the president of the Royal College of Physicians and Sir Thomas Hutchison, Lord Provost of Edinburgh, First Baronet of Hardiston in the County of Kinross, who held the office from 1921 to 1923. Robert's niece was the renowned Arctic explorer and botanist Isobel Wylie Hutchison.

Unlike Robert Hutchison, his younger brother Thomas Hutchison (Isobel Wylie Hutchison's father) devoted himself to the wine trade in the family tradition. Having spent time in India where he set about expanding the business and amassed considerable wealth, he returned and married at the age of 40. For the first few years of his marriage, he lived with his wife at his family's former home of Glendevon House where their eldest two children Nita and Walter were born.

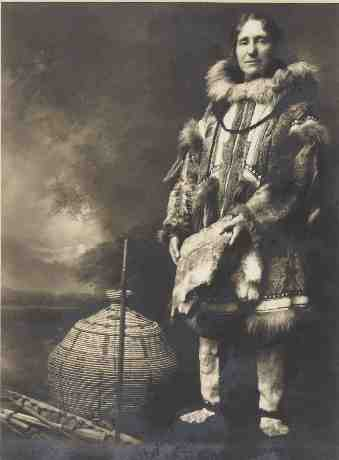
Isobel Wylie Hutchison in an eskimo coat on expedition

== In the twentieth century ==
The twentieth century was a tumultuous period for the castle. Thomas Hutchison died in 1900 after contracting a chill that rapidly developed into pneumonia. He was soon followed by his two sons, one to World War One and the other to a mountaineering accident. The tragedies left scars on the family that were never to heal fully, but in their own way contributed to the burgeoning career of Isobel Wylie Hutchison, endowing her with the independent financial means to fund her expeditions and enabling her to defy convention, steadfastly refusing to marry and settle down. Isobel was awarded the Mungo Park Medal by the Royal Scottish Geographical Society, for whom she later acted as vice president.

Expeditions aside, Isobel lived at Carlowrie Castle and tended to the grounds throughout her life. She remained at the castle until her death in 1982 at the age of 93.
