= Thomas Hutchinson =

Thomas or Tom Hutchinson may refer to:

- Thomas Hutchinson (MP) (1587–1643), English political figure
- Thomas Hutchinson (scholar) (1698–1769), English scholar
- Thomas Hutchinson (governor) (1711–1780), American colonial official
- Thomas Leger Hutchinson (1812–1883), intendant (mayor) of Charleston, South Carolina
- Thomas Joseph Hutchinson (1820–1885), Anglo-Irish surgeon, explorer, and writer
- Tom Hutchinson (Scottish footballer) (1872–1933)
- Tom Hutchinson (American football) (1941–2007), American football wide receiver
- Tom Hutchinson (English footballer) (born 1982)
- Tom Hutchinson (politician), American politician
- Tom Hutchinson, musician formerly with Cyanotic

== See also ==
- Thomas Hutchison (disambiguation)
- Tim Hutchinson (disambiguation)
