= Arthur Abney Walker =

British botanist

Arthur Abney Walker FRSE (1820–1894) was a 19th-century British botanist.

== Life ==
He was born in Yorkshire in April 1820 the second son of Elizabeth Abney and her husband, Henry Walker (1785–1860) of Blyth Hall and Clifton House, Rotherham. The Walker Brothers were prominent ironfounders, their notable works including Southwark Bridge in London. Their predecessors had specialised in cannons and supplied most of the cannon to the Royal Navy from the late 18th-century, including 80 of the 105 cannon on HMS Victory (the others being from the Carron Ironworks).

He studied medicine at the University of Edinburgh, graduating M.D. in 1857 with the thesis "On the comparative anatomy of the organ of hearing in man & in the lower animals".

There is mention of his being a surgeon, but does not appear to have ever practised, and is referred to in directories as a "gentleman", implying that he lived off independent means.

In 1861 he was living in Edinburgh with his young family. They lived at 32 Melville Street: a large mid-terraced Victorian townhouse in Edinburgh's fashionable West End.

In 1864 he was elected a Fellow of the Royal Society of Edinburgh his proposer being John Hutton Balfour. In 1866 he is also listed as a Member of the Edinburgh Botanical Society alongside Robert Hutchison of Carlowrie and Stevenson Macadam.

In the 1870s he moved from Clifton House in Rotherham.

He retired to Beech Lodge in Wimbledon Common and died there in 1894.

== Family ==
He was married at least twice, his second wife being Isabella Robertson, daughter of John Robertson of Edinburgh. They were parents to the sculptor Dame Ethel Walker (1861–1951).

His sons included Arthur Edward Walker (born 1851), Frederick John Walker (born 1853), Ernest Abney Walker (born 1854) and Col Henry Walker.

== Publications ==
- Studies of the Geographic Botany of Europe (1859)
