= William Lowrie Sleigh =

Scottish businessman

Sir William Lowrie Sleigh JP DL (1866–1945) was a Scottish businessman who co-founded the bicycle company the Ross & Sleigh Cycle Company (later renamed Rossleigh and expanding to sell cars). The company later evolved into Lowrie Sleigh Chauffeur Services. Sleigh served as Lord Provost of Edinburgh from 1923 to 1926.

== Life ==
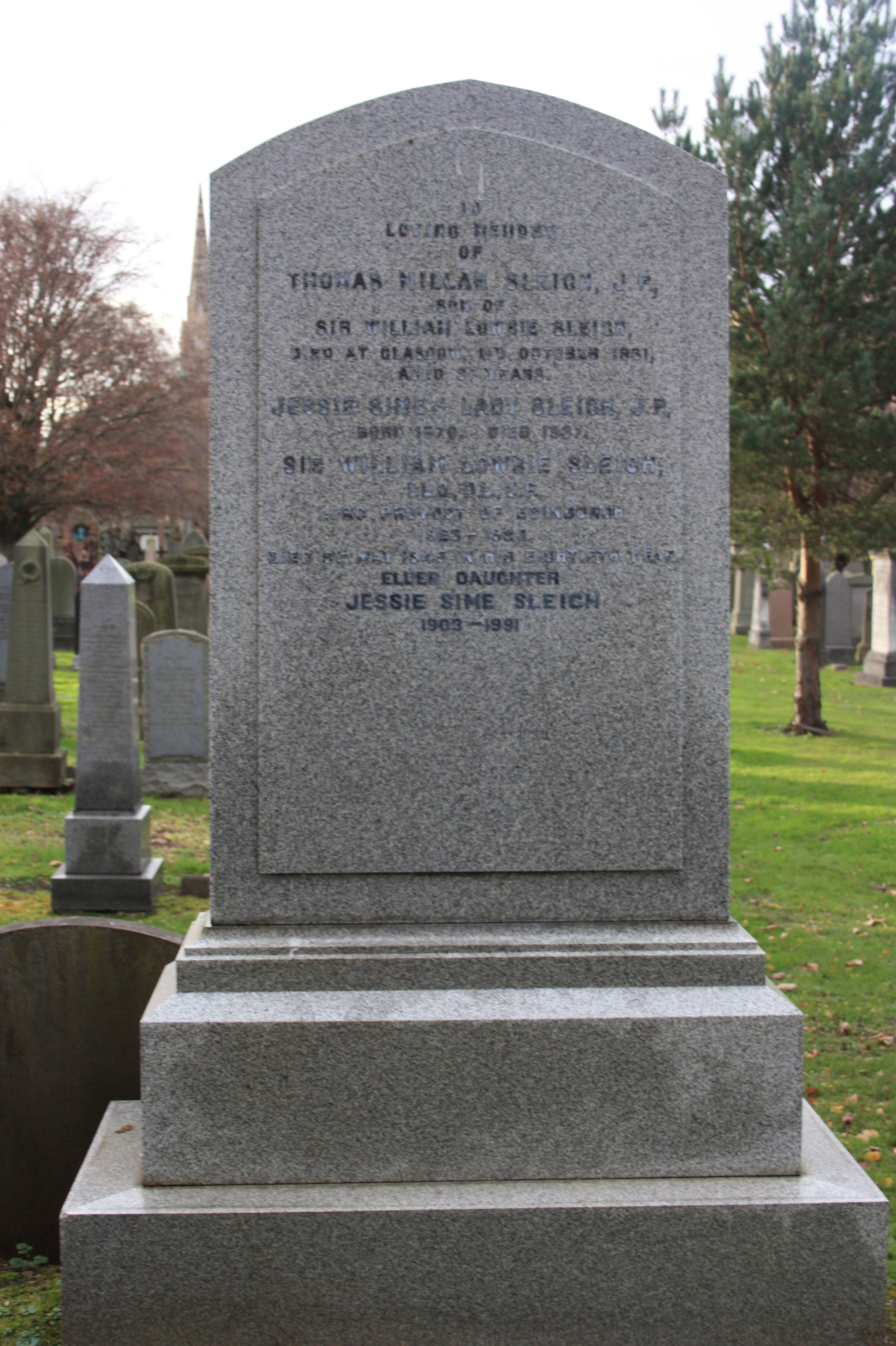
The grave of William Sleigh, Grange Cemetery, Edinburgh

He was born in 1866 the son of Peter Sleigh (1823–1892), a farmer in Lauder, and his wife, Mary Millar. The family lived at Marion Villa on Sciennes Hill in the Grange, Edinburgh.

Sleigh worked with his friend, Thomas Fraser Ross, in the Post Office, but they decided to leave to set up a company together, selling cycles (originally penny-farthings) founding the Ross and Sleigh Cycle Company in 1889. They established a shop at 28 Elm Row at the head of Leith Walk.

In 1910 he lived at 50 Lauder Road in the Grange.

In 1923, he replaced Sir Thomas Hutchison as Lord Provost of Edinburgh, and was replaced in turn by Sir Alexander Stevenson in 1926. He was knighted by King George V in the 1924 Birthday Honours.

He died on 5 May 1945 aged 79. He is buried in the Grange Cemetery near his home. The grave lies on the main east path not far from the main entrance.

== Artistic recognition ==
His full length portrait by Cowan Dobson is held by City of Edinburgh Council.

== Recognition ==
Sleigh Drive in the Craigentinny district was named during his period in office as Lord Provost.

== Family ==
He was married to Jessie Sime (1870–1937).

Both his son and grandson were also William Lowrie Sleigh.
