= Timothy Hutchinson =

Timothy or Tim Hutchinson may refer to:

- Tim Hutchinson (Young Timothy Hutchinson, born 1949), former United States senator from Arkansas
- Timothy Chad Hutchinson (born 1974), former member of the Arkansas House of Representatives and son of Tim Hutchinson
- Tim Hutchinson (production designer) (born 1946), British art director
- Tim Hely Hutchinson (born 1953), British publishing executive

== See also ==
- Tom Hutchinson (disambiguation)
- Tom Hutchison (disambiguation)
