= Eric Hutchinson (disambiguation) =

Eric Hutchinson is an American singer-songwriter.

Eric Hutchinson may also refer to:

- Eric Hutchinson (rugby union) (1916–1943), rugby union player who represented Australia
- Eric Hutchinson (politician), member for the Division of Lyons in the Australian House of Representatives from 2013 to 2016

== See also ==
- Eric Hutchison (disambiguation)
