= Myrtle Simpson =

Scottish skier and mountaineer

Myrtle Lillias Simpson (née Emslie; born around 1930) is a Scottish skier and the thirteenth woman to receive the Polar Medal. She has been called the "mother of Scottish skiing". She was the first woman to ski across Greenland on an unsupported expedition. She was president of the Scottish Ski Club in the 1970s and has written several books.

== Early life ==
She was from Aldershot and moved to Fort William, Highland age 21. She qualified as a radiographer and worked at the Belford Hospital.

== Skiing ==
She was part of the Edinburgh Andean expedition in 1958, climbing various routes with Hugh Simpson and Bill Wallace. The group made seven ascents, including the first British ascent of Huascarán, which at 6,768m is the fourth-highest mountain in the Americas. In 1965 she skied across Greenland with four others on an unsupported expedition, the first woman to achieve this. She was president of the Scottish Ski Club in the 1970s. She was an experienced climber.

== Other adventures ==
She wrote several books about her expeditions and on other subjects. In 1974 BBC Scotland broadcast Breathing Space: To the Land Where Glaciers Grow, featuring Myrtle Simpson, her husband Hugh, and their four children, on a 200-mile expedition in canoes and on foot across West Greenland.

She lives at Kincraig.

== Awards and honours ==
In 1969, she and her husband Dr Hugh Simpson were awarded the Mungo Park Medal by the Royal Scottish Geographical Society.

In 2013 she was given the Scottish Award for Excellence in Mountain Culture.

In January 2017 she was awarded the Polar Medal in recognition of her arctic achievements. Her husband Hugh had been awarded the Polar medal fifty years previously. She received the medal at a ceremony in London in May. That year, she became one of the Saltire Society's Outstanding Women.
