= Thomas Hutchison (politician) =

Scottish landowner and politician (1866–1925)

Sir Thomas Hutchison
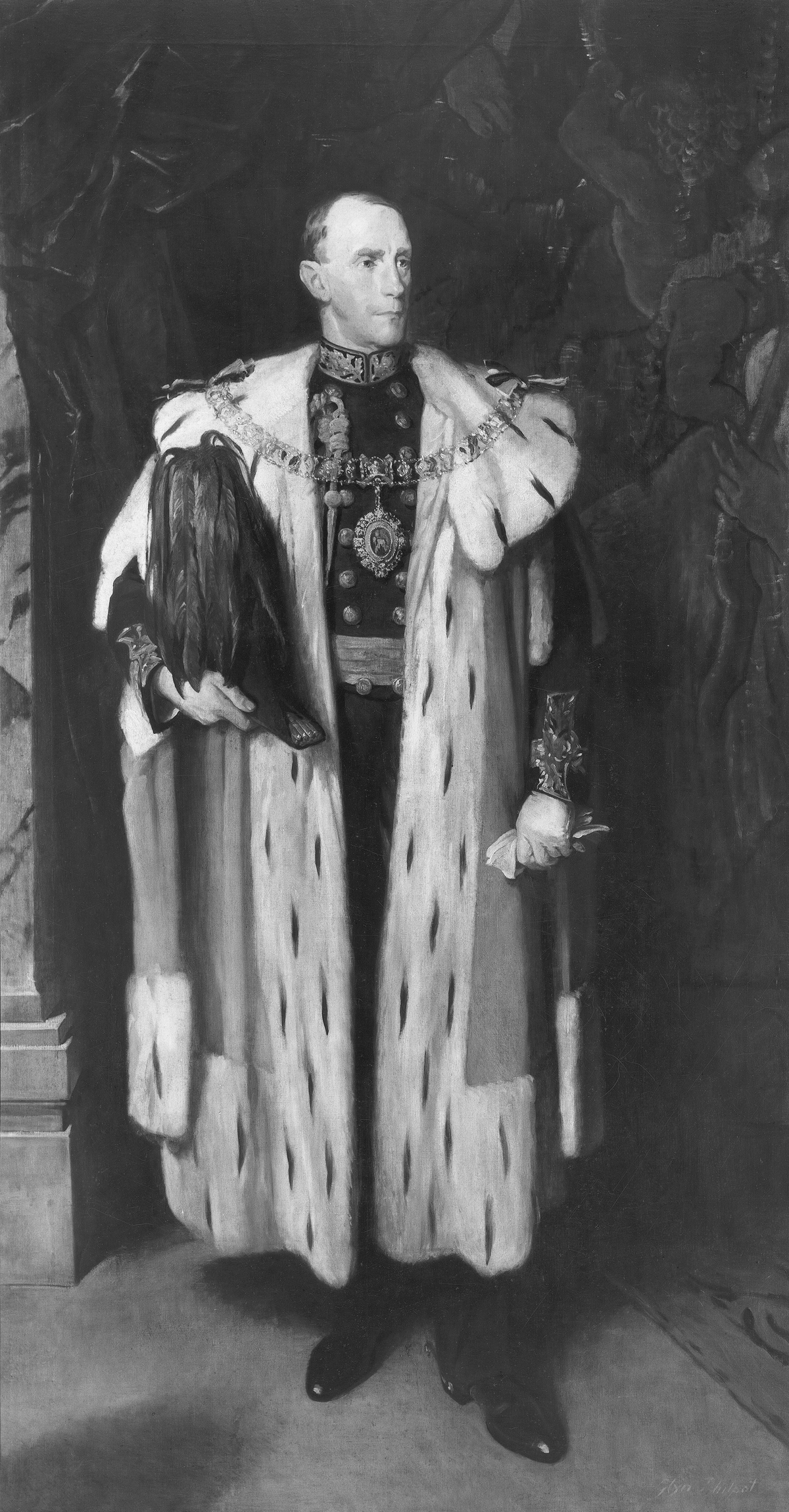
- Painting of Hutchison by Glyn Warren Philpot, c. 1923

Lord Provost of Edinburgh
- In office 1921–1923
- Preceded by: John William Chesser
- Succeeded by: William Lowrie Sleigh

Personal details
- Born: 16 December 1866 Kirkliston, Scotland
- Resting place: Dean Cemetery
- Spouse: Jane Moir Ogilvy Spence
- Parent: Robert Hutchison (father)
- Occupation: Landowner; politician

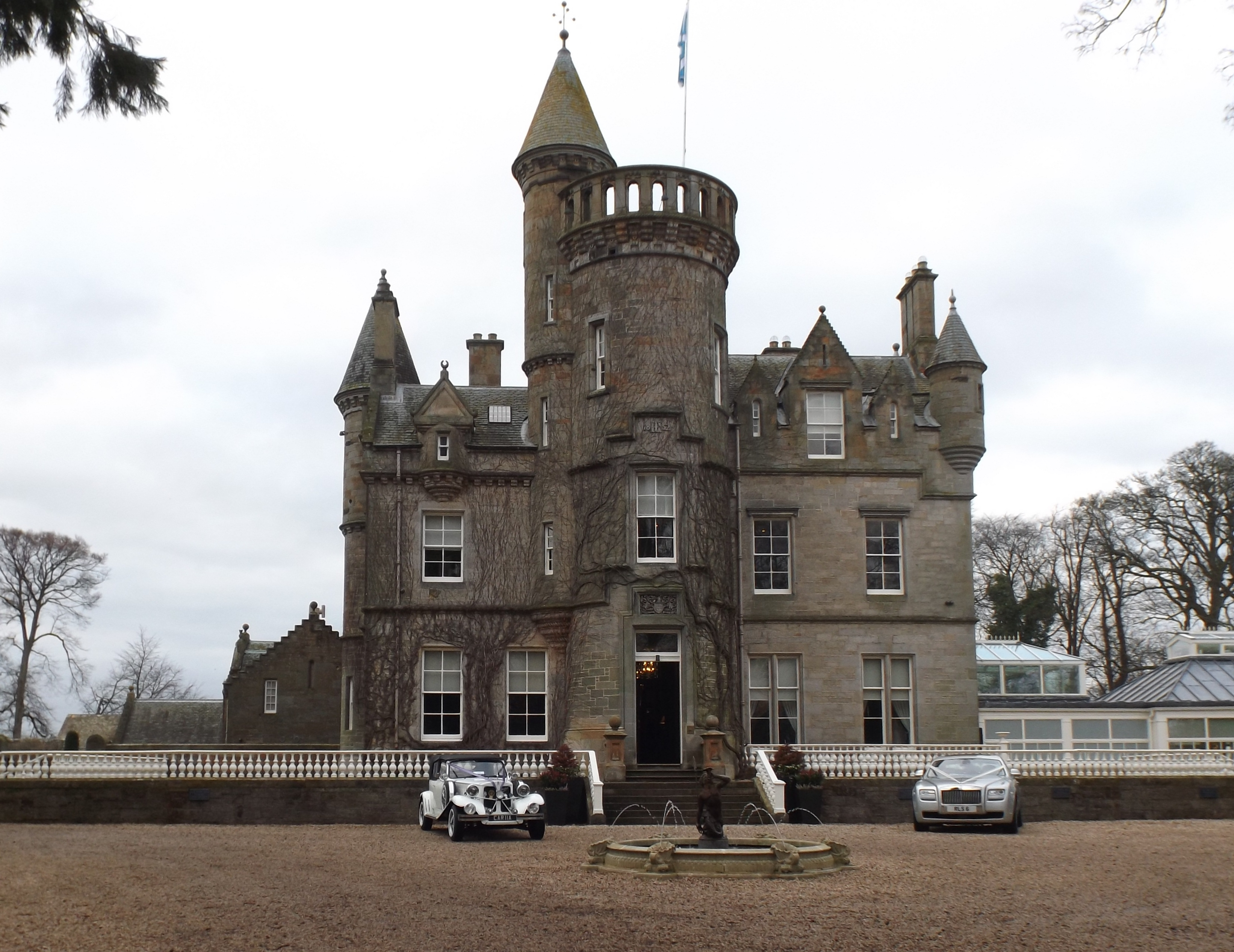
Carlowrie Castle, built by the Hutchison family in the mid 19th century.

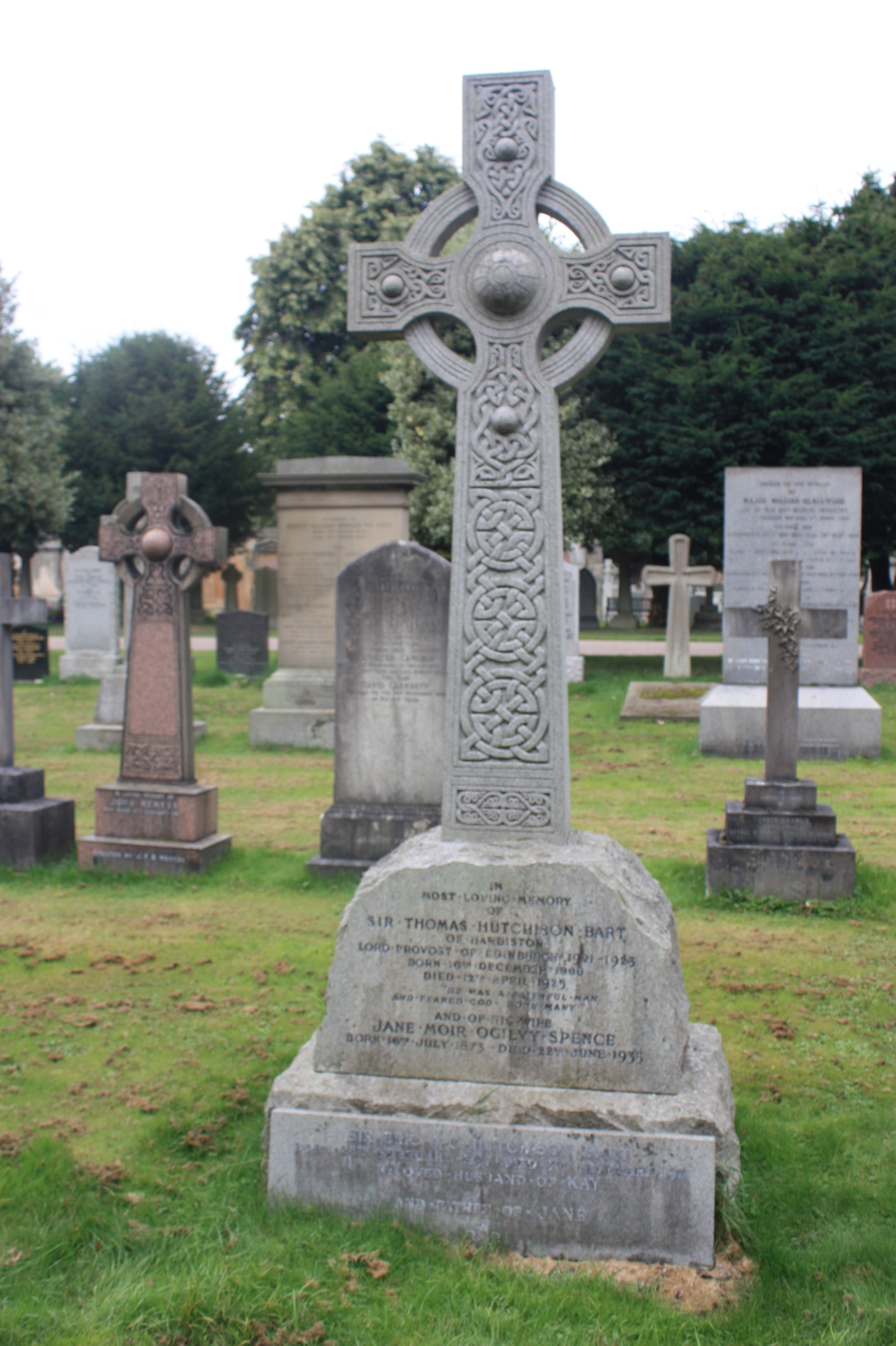
The Hardiston Hutchison baronets grave, Dean Cemetery, Edinburgh

Sir Thomas Hutchison (16 December 1866 – 12 April 1925) was a Scottish landowner and politician. He served as Lord Provost of Edinburgh from 1921 to 1923.

== Early life ==
He was born at Carlowrie Castle on 16 December 1866, the son of Robert Hutchison of Carlowrie and his wife, Mary Jemima Tait. His younger brother was the eminent physician Sir Robert Hutchison, independently knighted for his medical contributions. His namesake uncle, Thomas Hutchison, former Provost of Leith, had commissioned Carlowrie.

== Career ==
He succeeded John William Chesser as Lord Provost in 1921 and was succeeded in turn by William Lowrie Sleigh in 1923.

He was created a baronet in the 1923 Birthday Honours.

== Personal life ==
His Edinburgh address was 28 Royal Terrace on Calton Hill but he also inherited the family home of Carlowrie Castle near Kirkliston.

He was married to Jane Moir Ogilvy Spence (1873–1935).

== Death and legacy ==
He died on 12 April 1925. He is buried with his wife in Dean Cemetery in western Edinburgh. The grave lies on the south path close to the main (east) entrance.

The Hutchison area of Edinburgh was named for him during his term as Lord Provost.

== See also ==
- Hutchison baronets
