= Mungo Park Medal =

The Mungo Park Medal is awarded by the Royal Scottish Geographical Society in recognition of outstanding contributions to geographical knowledge through exploration and/or research, and/or work of a practical nature of benefit to humanity in potentially hazardous physical and/or social environments. It was founded in honour of the Scottish explorer Mungo Park.

== Winners ==
- 1930 Captain Angus Buchanan (Explorer)
- 1931 Frank S Smythe
- 1934 Miss Isobel Wylie Hutchison LLD FRSGS
- 1935 Dame Freya Stark
- 1936 Lawrence R Wager MA FGS Lecturer in Geology, University of Reading
- 1939 Dr E B Worthington MA PhD for his work in the African Survey
- 1944 Frank Fraser Darling DSc
- 1947 Lt-Col F Spencer Chapman DSO
- 1948 Mrs Mary G Henry
- 1950 Thor Heyerdahl
- 1952 William H Murray
- 1953 Count Eigil Knuth
- 1954 Dr Alain Bombard MD
- 1955 Thomas Dempster Mackinnon
- 1955 George Christopher Band
- 1961 Dame Margery F Perham DCMG CBE FBA
- 1962 Professor C G Malcolm Slesser
- 1964 Norman Dyhrenfurth
- 1969 Dr Hugh Simpson and Mrs Myrtle Simpson
- 1975 Dr Haroun Tazieff
- 1981 Professor Keith L Miller
- 1987 John Ridgway MBE
- 1988 Dr John Hemming
- 1989 Christina Dodwell
- 1990 Dr Charles Swithinbank
- 1991 Professor Andrew Goudie
- 1992 Nicholas Crane & Richard Crane
- 1993 Professor David E Sugden
- 1994 Michael Buerk
- 1995 Mr Nigel Winser & Mrs Shane Winser
- 1996 Mr Michael Asher
- 1997 Professor Chalmers M Clapperton
- 1998 Julian Pettifer, journalist and broadcaster
- 1999 Kate Adie
- 2000 Colin G D Thubron
- 2001 Robin Hanbury-Tenison OBE
- 2002 William Dalrymple
- 2003 John Simpson CBE, World Affairs Editor, BBC
- 2004 Norma Joseph and Maurice Joseph
- 2005 Professor Jean Malaurie
- 2006 Dr John Hare
- 2007 Professor Norman Hallendy
- 2008 No award
- 2009 Ray Mears
- 2010 Rune Gjeldnes
- 2011 Ed Stafford, Explorer, author and film-maker.
- 2012 Jock Wishart
- 2013 Tim Butcher
- 2014 Lindsey Hilsum
- 2016 Karen Darke
- 2017 André Borschberg and Bertrand Piccard
- 2018 Professor Wade Davis
- 2018 Doug Allan
- 2019 Lewis Pugh, endurance swimmer and UN Patron of the Oceans

== See also ==
- List of geography awards
