= Isobel Wylie Hutchison =

Scottish Arctic traveller and botanist (1889–1982)

Isobel Wylie Hutchison FRGS
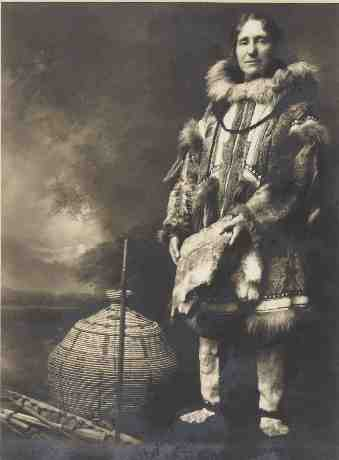
- Hutchison in Arctic gear, c. 1927
- Born: 30 May 1889; Carlowrie Castle, West Lothian, Scotland
- Died: 20 February 1982 (aged 92); Carlowrie Castle, West Lothian, Scotland
- Education: Studley Horticultural College for Women
- Occupations: Arctic traveller; botanist
- Relatives: Robert Hutchison of Carlowrie (uncle)
- Awards: Mungo Park Medal

Isobel Wylie Hutchison FRGS (30 May 1889 – 20 February 1982) was a Scottish Arctic traveller, filmmaker and botanist. Hutchison published poetry, books describing her travels to Iceland, Greenland, Alaska, and the Aleutian Islands, and articles in National Geographic and other magazines. She lectured frequently, using her films, photographs, and paintings to illustrate her talks. Her papers were gifted to the National Library of Scotland by her long-time friend Medina Lewis.

Many of the plants Hutchison collected during her life are in Kew Gardens, the Royal Botanic Garden Edinburgh and the British Museum. In 1934, she became the first woman to receive the Mungo Park Medal from the Royal Scottish Geographical Society. In 1949, she was awarded an honorary degree from the University of St Andrews in recognition of her botanical and literary contributions and “that indomitable spirit which defies hazard, danger and discomfort, and is the source of all great human achievement”.

== Early life ==
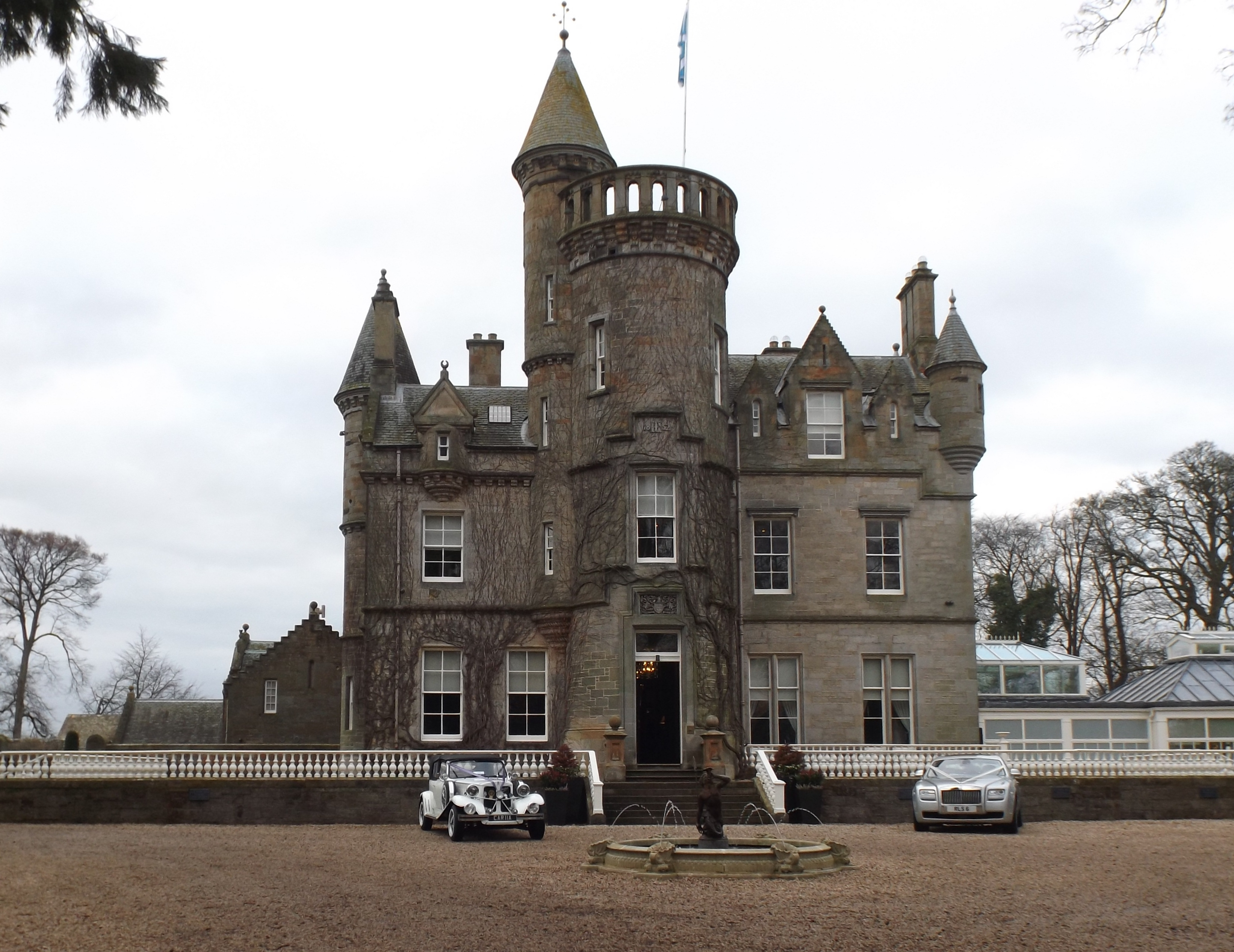
Carlowrie Castle, built by the Hutchison family in the mid-19th century

Hutchison was born at Carlowrie Castle in West Lothian, the third of five children of Jeannie Wylie (1857–1931) and Thomas Hutchison (1841–1900). Her father died when she was 10 years old. He left equal provision for all of his children with trusts, and as a result, she was financially independent throughout her life.

Her uncle was Robert Hutchison of Carlowrie. Her grandfather Thomas Hutchison (1796–1852) had been provost of Leith and was well-established in the wine wholesaling trade, and his father-in-law had been a successful farmer; his wealth enabled him to spend a great deal of time with Isobel, teaching her about botany and gardening. She also received a private education from a governess, and was active physically at croquet, tennis, archery, skating, hiking, cycling, Scottish country dancing, and walking.

From 1900, she attended school in Edinburgh, where she studied a curriculum suited for a Victorian gentlewoman. After her sister married a naval officer and saw little of him for long periods, Isobel decided that marriage would restrict her life.

Hutchison confessed to wanting to be a poet and started writing while young. She began keeping a diary as early as 1899 and continued to do so for most of her life. She edited The Scribbler, a magazine created by the family, which she continued to write even into her 20s. A polyglot, by the time she was an adult, she could speak Italian, Gaelic, Greek, Hebrew, Danish, Icelandic, Greenlandic, and some Inuit words.

From her early years, she had gone for long walks and would often walk the 8 miles (13 km) from Carlowrie to Edinburgh, spurning the family motorcar. These walks reached 100 miles (160 km) when she was 20, for examples Blairgowrie to Fort Augustus (100 miles (160 km)) and Doune to Oban (70 miles (110 km)). Later on, she went for long "strolls" and wrote articles for the National Geographic afterwards.

Hutchison's youngest brother, Frank, died in 1912 at the age of 16 in a climbing accident in the Cairngorms. Another brother, Walter, was killed in the First World War.

From 1917 to 1918, Hutchison studied business training and marketing, as well as religion and language, at Studley Horticultural College for Women in Warwickshire. In 1918, with little food for the animals and all the men gone to the war, influenza swept through the college, and some students died. Shy and perhaps somewhat naive, Hutchison connected emotionally with the other women students, making life-long friends such as Medina Lewis. However, she felt somewhat at a loss when her friends expressed their interest in men, writing in her diary: "I feel as if I belonged to neither sex - a sort of onlooker."

== Post war ==
The confusion and uncertainty Hutchison felt at Studley College was not resolved when she graduated with her horticultural certificate. She entered King's College London in the fall of 1919, living at a women's hostel and taking classes in religious studies. After six months of "fevered activity and emotional instability", Hutchison suffered a mental breakdown in 1920. She was sustained by the continued success of her writing; her poetry was acclaimed by The Scotsman, and she began writing a novel. She supplemented her legacy from her father with the fees she received.

In 1924, Hutchison was invited to join a well-off Edinburgh acquaintance on a tour to Spain, Morocco, Egypt, and Palestine, arranged by Thomas Cook. She found her female companion rather overprotective, causing Hutchison to resolve to travel alone in the future. In later life, she traveled alone or with men, but never married.

On her return to Scotland, she spent some time walking on Barra, North and South Uist, Harris, Scotland, and Lewis, and completed a 150 miles (240 km) trek. She wrote an article for the National Geographic and received $250, which partially paid for her trip to Iceland.

== Arctic adventures ==
=== Iceland ===
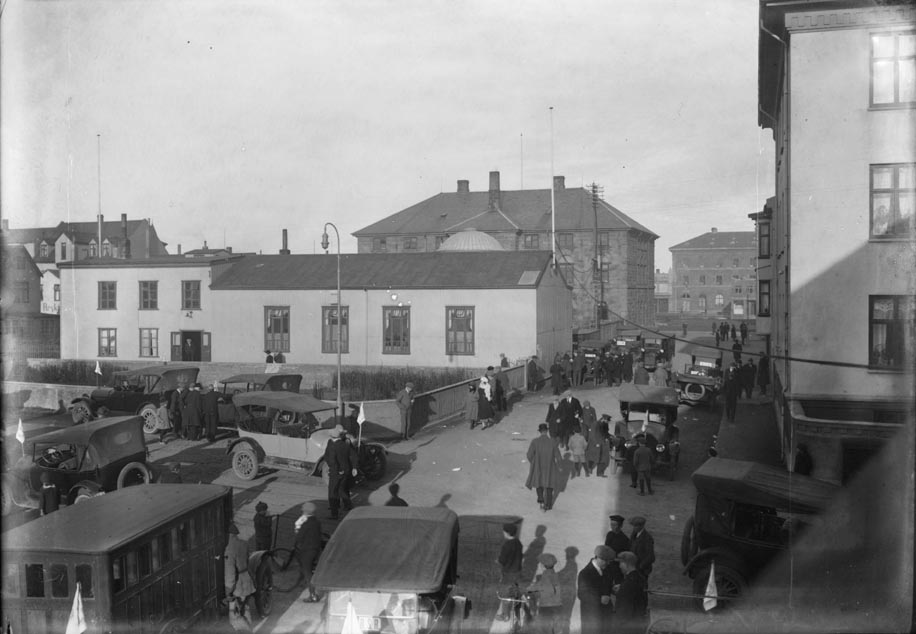
Reykjavik in the 1920s

Hutchison got the idea of travelling to Iceland in 1924, while sitting on the beach at the Butt of Lewis. This started out much as a holiday tour. She went to Reykjavík for about a month and looked at the geysers and other tourist sights. After attending a lecture by Jean-Baptiste Charcot, she decided to walk around Iceland.

This was unheard of by the local guides, who refused to organise a trip. Eventually, one guide did give her a route to follow, on which she frequently got lost. However, the Icelanders were hospitable and helped her by lending her ponies, for which they often refused to accept payment. Although she was impressed with the flowers on Iceland, she was not collecting seriously on this visit. After returning to Scotland, she wrote another article for National Geographic, which they published as a major 30-page feature.

=== Greenland ===
Greenland was not so easy to visit as Iceland. The Danish authorities closely monitored visitors to the country, but as she was travelling on official permission to collect flowers for various organisations, she was granted a visa.

She travelled by sea and spent much time living on board while exploring the east of the country in July 1927. She did, however, visit and get to know many Greenlanders. She was careful to keep in with the Danish officials and their wives, as a large difference in status still existed between the Danes and the native people. Greenland had a thriving Christian community, which Hutchison, as a regular churchgoer, joined enthusiastically. Consequently, whenever a pastor was going to visit an outlying village, she would be offered a lift with him in his boat. This allowed her to see several ancient churches and cathedrals, of which there were a large number. At each stop, she would collect flowers and plants to send back home.

The town of Angmagssalik, founded in 1895, was still primitive when Hutchison arrived in 1927. She stayed there for four days and collected flowers, sailing in an umiak and visiting a Greenlandic tent home. She bought kamiker and thigh-length boots, and wore them to protect against biting insects.

Her next visit was to Augpilagtok, where cliffs rise thousands of feet out of the sea. She was shocked to see how poor the Greenlanders were. She gave one woman her last pair of spare socks and commissioned a carver to make a model of a kayak to give him some money; this model is now in the National Museum of Scotland. When she arrived in Julianehab, the town had no hotels or hostels, so she stayed with the district manager, but continued to eat on board the ship. She joined in Scottish country dancing, which had been introduced by Scottish whalers, with Greenlanders and her fellow passengers.

Her next stop was Igaliko, where she met Hans Reynolds, a Norwegian scientist, who showed her ruins from the 10th century and remains of the cathedral from 1146. She found over 50 plants there and some barley. She later visited several Danish settlements near Cape Farewell.

Reaching Cape Farewell itself was not possible, so she landed at Nanortalik, where she stayed with the Danish manager, Mr Mathieson, who helped her journey to an island of birch trees, in an umiak with six rowers and a steersman. This voyage took five days, and Hutchison regarded it as one of the best times of her life.

Before leaving Greenland, Hutchison met Dr Knud Rasmussen, who became a firm friend. She returned to Scotland on the Disko, arriving at Leith on Christmas morning, 1927.

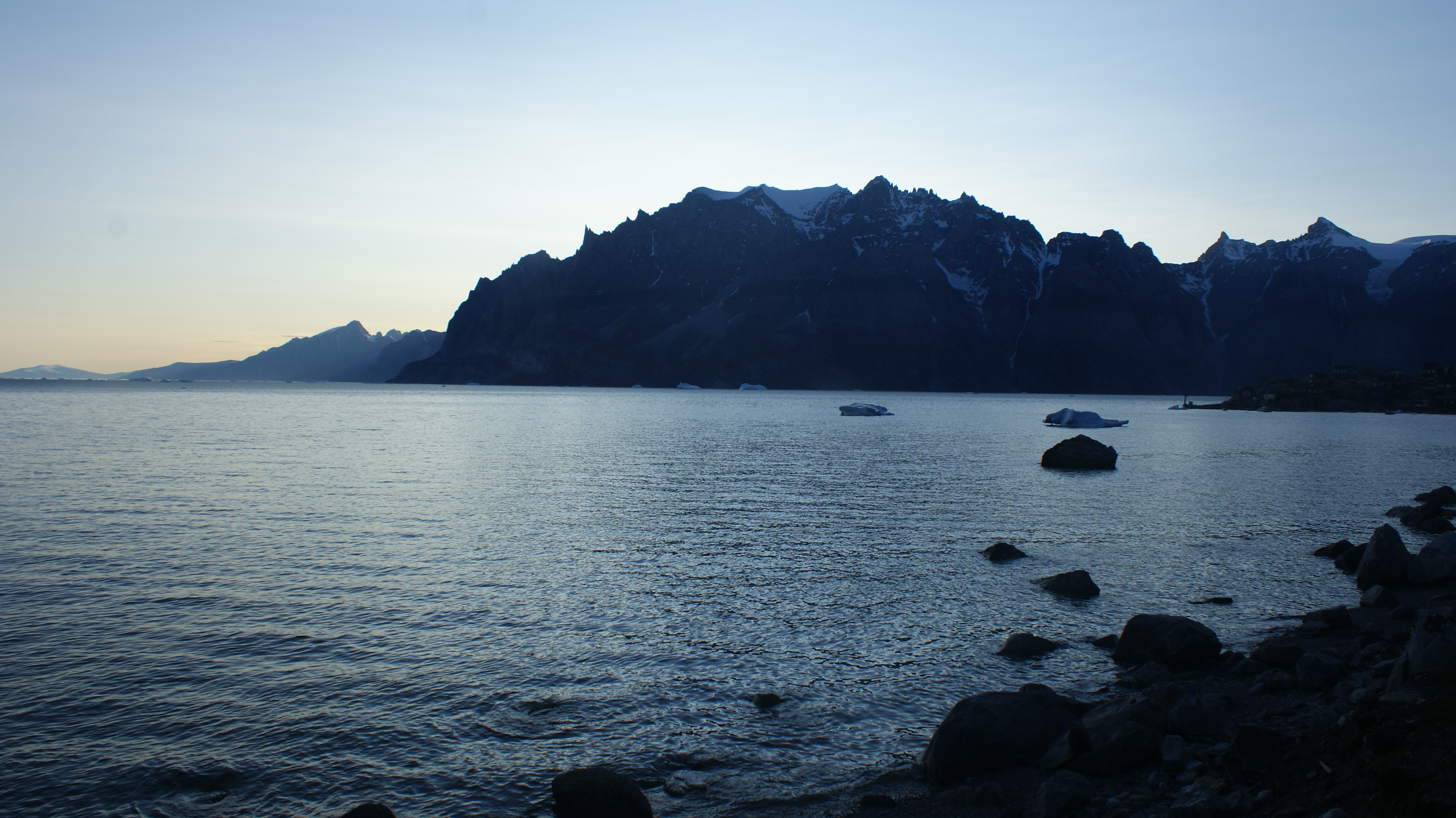
Part of the Umanak fjord

She had made many friends during her visit to Greenland, and Dr Rasmussen came to stay at Carlowrie. In April 1928, she got permission to visit the west of Greenland, and spent the next six months preparing. In August, she sailed to Disko Island. There, she met Dr Morton Porsild, director of the Arctic Research Station, who gave her advice on what seeds to collect and where they could be found. She would then send these on to the Royal Horticultural Society. She moved to Umanak where about 10 Danes lived with many locals. She stayed in a vacant three-bedroom house, and a housekeeper was found for her called Dorthe, who later became a close friend. Initially, Hutchison could only speak Danish, but she soon learned Greenlandic. She spent some time collecting plants on Nugssuak and also sketched on this trip. Later, she went to Igdlorssuit (Unknown Island) and then to Upernivik, where she stayed in a basic hut. By this point, she had filled 300 envelopes with seeds. During the winter, she gave a film show using the projector she had brought.

Hutchison had brought many books with her, and she lent these to her Danish friends. She had also brought her steel skates (the locals only had wooden ones) and received much exercise. She attended church regularly with Dorthe and often went to local coffee mornings. Sanitation was a problem, with typhoid and consumption ever present; at one point, Dorthe fell ill, and Hutchison had to carry out the housework herself.

Hutchison had spent seven months in the bay, during which time she had learned much about the way of life and the tensions which existed between the two communities. The dark nights made the social life full of parties and coffee mornings. The winter of 1928 was hard, and the temperature fell to 10 °F (−12 °C), causing the bay to freeze solid. She went fishing through the ice, which she enjoyed. Her experience became the subject of a poem.

Dogs in the village had to be killed for food and fur, which upset her. Normally, the residents lived on seal and halibut. By April, daylight was sufficient to turn off the constant oil light. When the ice started to melt, she was able to leave Disko Island and go on tour with the pastor to visit other communities around the Umanak Bay, meaning she could look for more plants and flowers. At each community, the pastor carried out communion services, which much impressed her. That became the subject of three or four poems. She got to know the eight rowers well, as by this time she spoke Greenlandic fluently. At the end of the trip, she landed on Unknown Island, staying for a month in a small Danish house. Her time there was her happiest in Greenland, and she is recorded as having said, "I am glad to be alone for a little".

She made several botanical excursions in the manager's motorboat to visit other nearby islands. From here, Hutchison could see the mountain on Nugsuuaq, which she decided to climb. Helped by a team of two local men, she succeeded in reaching the summit at 6,250 feet (1,900 m), after 12 hours of climbing.

On a cold day in late August 1929, she left the Umanak Bay. Her next book, On Greenland’s Closed Shore, was received with much acclaim, and over the next two years, she gave many lectures and talks on the BBC and wrote articles and poems.

=== Alaska ===
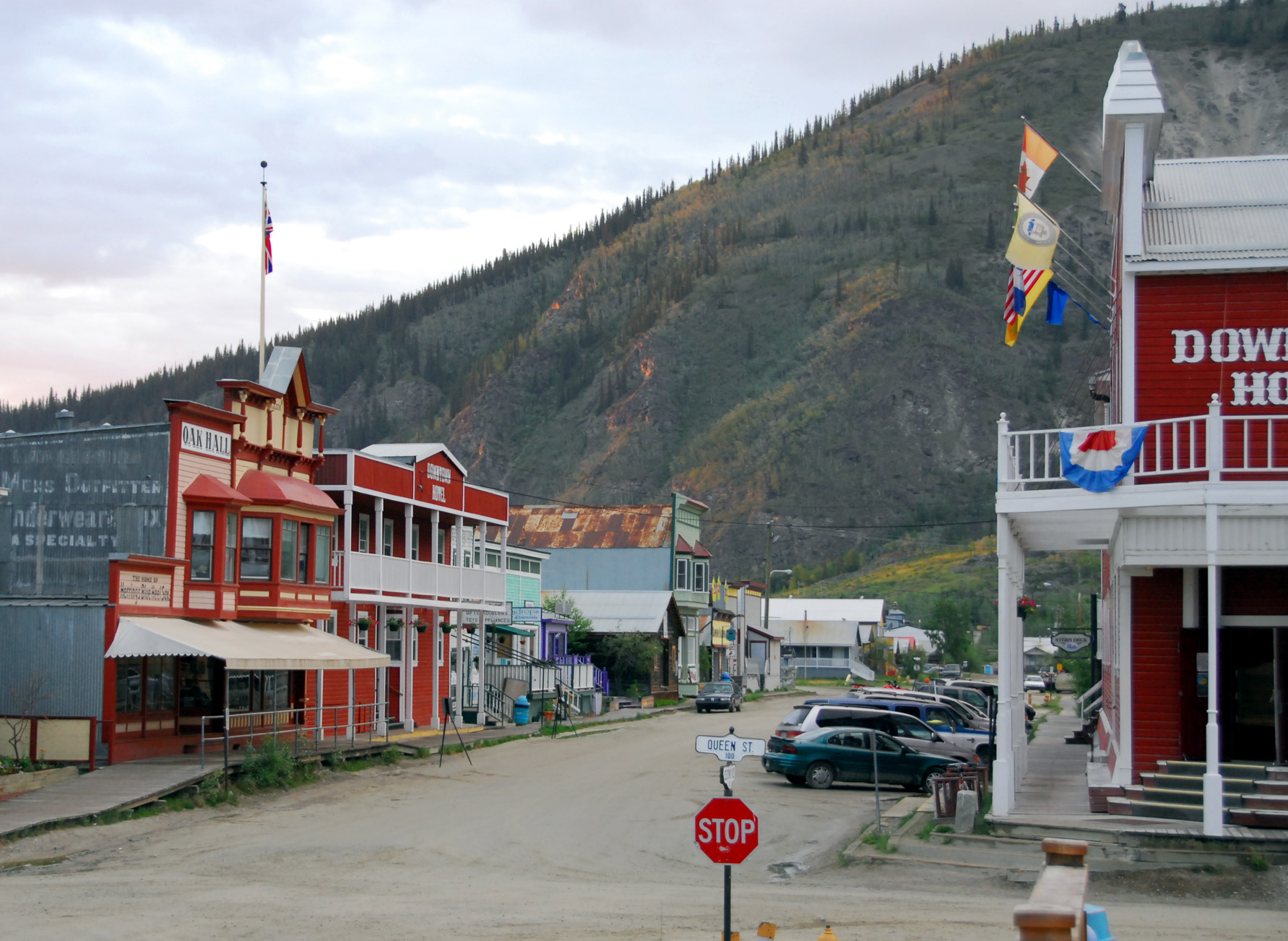
Dawson.

Hutchsion was inspired to go to Alaska after reading a book on the American Arctic. Leaving Manchester by cargo boat on 3 May 1933, she crossed the Atlantic, passed through the Panama Canal, then travelled up the western coast of America. The ship had only six passengers, but she traveled in reasonable comfort.

After a brief stop in Vancouver, she travelled up the Inside Passage to Ketchikan and then disembarked at Skagway. She took the railway from there to Whitepass, where she caught the sternwheeler Casca for a comfortable trip down the Yukon. On board the ship, she met various people, who gave her useful information about how to travel and where to winter.

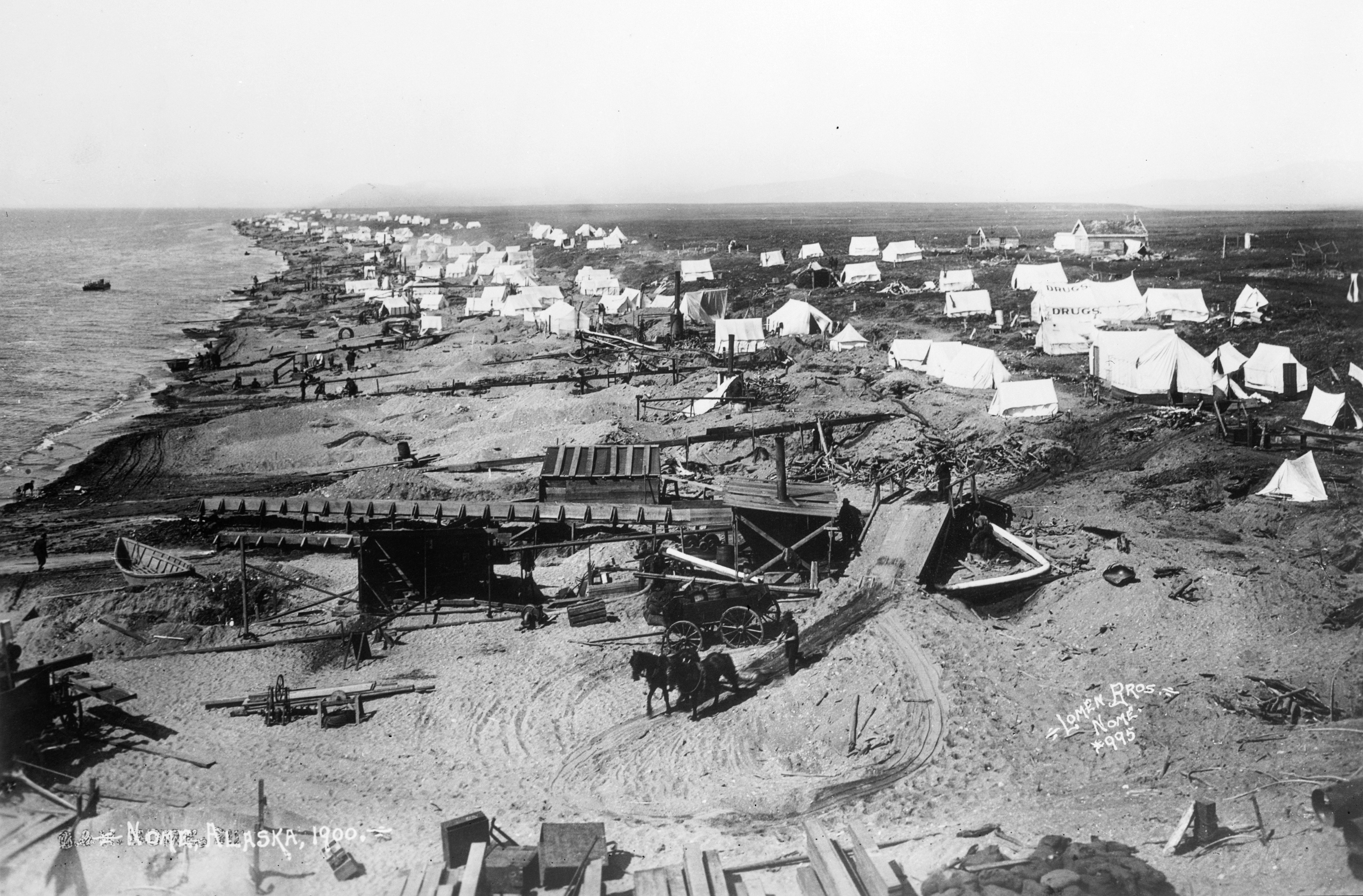
Nome in 1900

The boat was delayed in Dawson. Always ready to climb mountains, while here, she tackled the Dome (1,500 feet (460 m)) with Harry Lester, a Mountie whom she had met on board the Casca. She also met several local botanists, who told her what plants to collect and where to get them.

She was advised to send all her luggage to Aklavik, as the Anyox, which she had hoped to catch, had been damaged. She arrived at Fort Yukon at midnight, where she was met by friends of people she had met on board. She went to Tenana and then Nenana, as the next boat was running late. Vilhjalmur Stefansson, an Arctic explorer whom she had already met, pointed out that she would not be able to complete her journey unless she speeded up by flying to Nome. She had over 360 kilograms (790 lb) of luggage, meaning the flight cost her $250. She enjoyed the flight, as it was only her second, but she had to land at Nulato overnight before arriving at Nome next day.

In a short time, Hutchison made friends amongst the leading citizens of Nome. She ate in local restaurants and acquired much useful information. The repaired Anyox could not pick her up at Nome because of thick ice, and no other large ships were available on which she could travel, meaning she was forced to spend five weeks in Nome. She met a local botanist, Charles Thornton, who helped her to collect 200 of the 278 local plants.

She also met a Russian trader named Ira Rank, who had a small boat imaginatively called the Trader. He told her that from Nome to Point Barrow was 500 miles (800 km), which could, with luck, be done in five days. However, the boat was small, and Hutchison was forced to share a cabin with Rank, while the boat's two other crewmen slept by the engine. Testament to her adaptability, Hutchison was quite happy to go from travelling in luxury to travelling with three Russians in a cramped and smelly boat. The Trader visited many Eskimo villages on the north coast. They entered the Bering Strait on 2 August, but ran into a gale and pack ice, forcing them to shelter in the Prince of Wales Bay for two days, during which time Hutchison went for walks and hunted plants. They were fed and entertained by two tin miners.

As the next day was calm, they reached Point Hope, which had an old Eskimo village. The inhabitants lived on whales, walrus, and seals. Hutchison went collecting flowers with the wife of the local teacher. She also bought some Eskimo artefacts and would have liked to have stayed longer.

They headed past Port Lisburne and on to Cape Lay, before traveling inland through a series of shallow lagoons. Hutchison saw her first ice cake here. They anchored by one, but it took them back 12 miles (19 km) during the night.

On 11 August, they reached Wainwright, one of the largest Eskimo communities where they traded. They heard that the SS Baychimo, a "ghost ship" belonging to the Hudson's Bay Company, which had been trapped in the ice and abandoned, had been sighted only 12 miles (19 km) out. The men were all for going out and seeing what they could salvage.

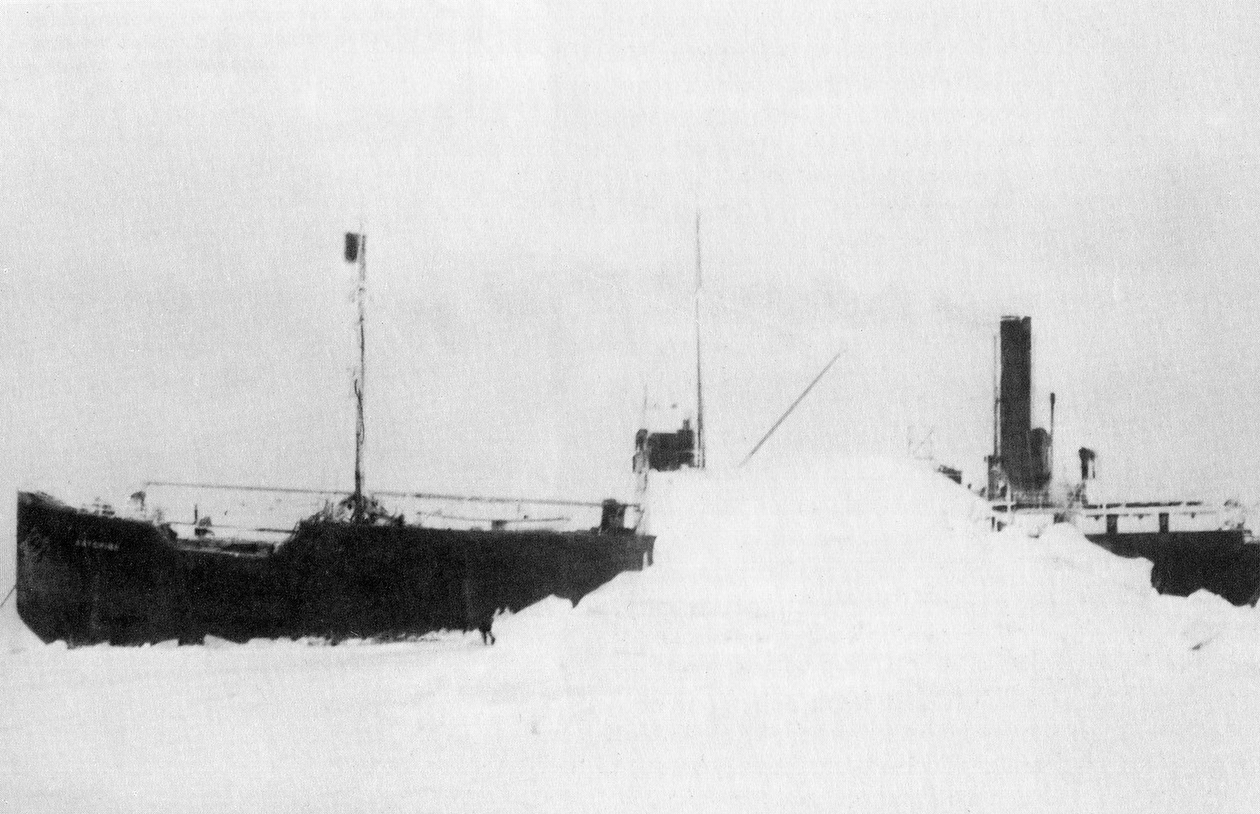
The Baychimo in 1931

Though Eskimos had already raided it, much useful equipment was still on the Baychimo. The crew of the Trader wanted to take the whole ship, but it was too big for them, so they took only some valuable items. By this time, Hutchison had fully adapted to life on the Trader and had become friendly with the crewmen.

The Trader inched her way forward to Singet, which was only 25 miles (40 km) from Barrow. Here, they stayed in an old Eskimo cabin, which she helped Ira Rank to clean up. On 1 September, a lead opened up and they were able to reach Barrow.

The Trader was unable to progress any further, so Hutchison was introduced to Gus Masik, who had a boat called the Hazel with two Eskimos as crew. After a sad farewell to the crew of the Trader, Hutchison departed on the Hazel on 9 September. They crossed Smith Bay and anchored in fog at Thetis Island. At Beech Point, they met an old friend of Masik's, Aarnout Castel.

Hutchison liked Mrs Castel and talked to her in the kitchen, while the men traded goods. They went on to Flaxman Island, where there was a trading post. She went ashore for a walk, enjoying the peace and beauty. The Hazel then crossed Camden Bay, passing Barter Island, and eventually arrived at Martin Point on 15 September.

Painting by Hutchison of Gus Masik in his cabin at Martin Point

Now, only 120 miles (190 km) remained to Herschel Island, where Hutchison wanted to winter. The ice closed in four days later, though, and they were locked in for the winter; Hutchison was forced to stay in Masik's one-roomed hut on Martin Point. Hutchison spent the time collecting flowers and having religious discussions with Masik, whose life story she wrote down and later published.

At the end of October, she went to visit Tom Gordon, a giant Scotsman who had been a whaling ship captain, but had been forced to become a trader after his ship was destroyed by the ice. He lived, with his native wife and their many children, in a two-roomed cabin with a lean-to. Hutchison described it as a Scottish-Eskimo household filled with characters, and stayed here for seven weeks.

On 3 November, she set out on sledge with Gus Masik for Herschel Island. They arrived on the noon of the fourth day, and Hutchison was warmly welcomed by the local agent. The island, which was 8 miles (13 km) long and 4 miles (6.4 km) wide, was normally busy with ships, but in winter accommodated only four white people and two Eskimo families. Masik stayed two more days and then left. Hutchison would see him again at Nome and then at Carlowrie. Special Constable Ethier and his wife would look after her for two days, before organising a local guide to take her to Aklavik.

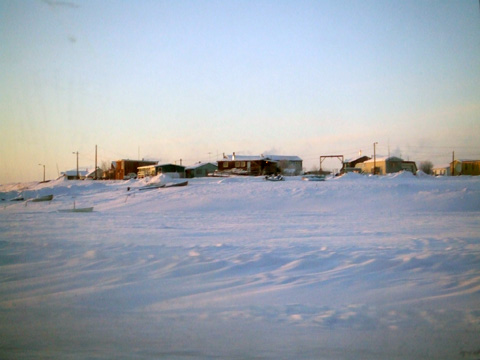
Aklavik.

They left on 10 November, in −20 °F (−29 °C), and arrived at Head Point at four o'clock. The next day, a young Inuk called Isaac was paid to take her to Shingle Point. It was 20 degrees colder (−40 °F (−40 °C)) than the previous day, and Hutchison was forced to run behind the sled to keep warm. When she arrived at Shingle Point, she was fed royally by three English ladies and Mr Webster, the Anglican minister. A school was here, and she started to wonder about the effect the white teachers were having on the Eskimos; English was no use to them when they went back to their families. In addition, many illnesses were being brought in and several Eskimos were sick or had died. She stayed here for 13 days, and on 23 November, a group set off for Aklavik. It was so cold that they turned back after two hours. The next day was warmer, and two days later they reached Aklavik.

This was a well established town and the administrative centre for the area. The church and police had bases here, and planes and ships arrived here. Hutchison joined in the social life, but was a curiosity as a single woman. Not wishing to cause offence, she was careful to edit her accounts of how she stayed with the various traders and Eskimos.

She left the town by aeroplane on 5 February, and after several legs, arrived in Winnipeg. From here, she caught the Alaunier and got back to Scotland in the beginning of March. Her exploits had gone before her to UK, and her activities were reported in the Times on 10 January.

=== Aleutian Islands ===
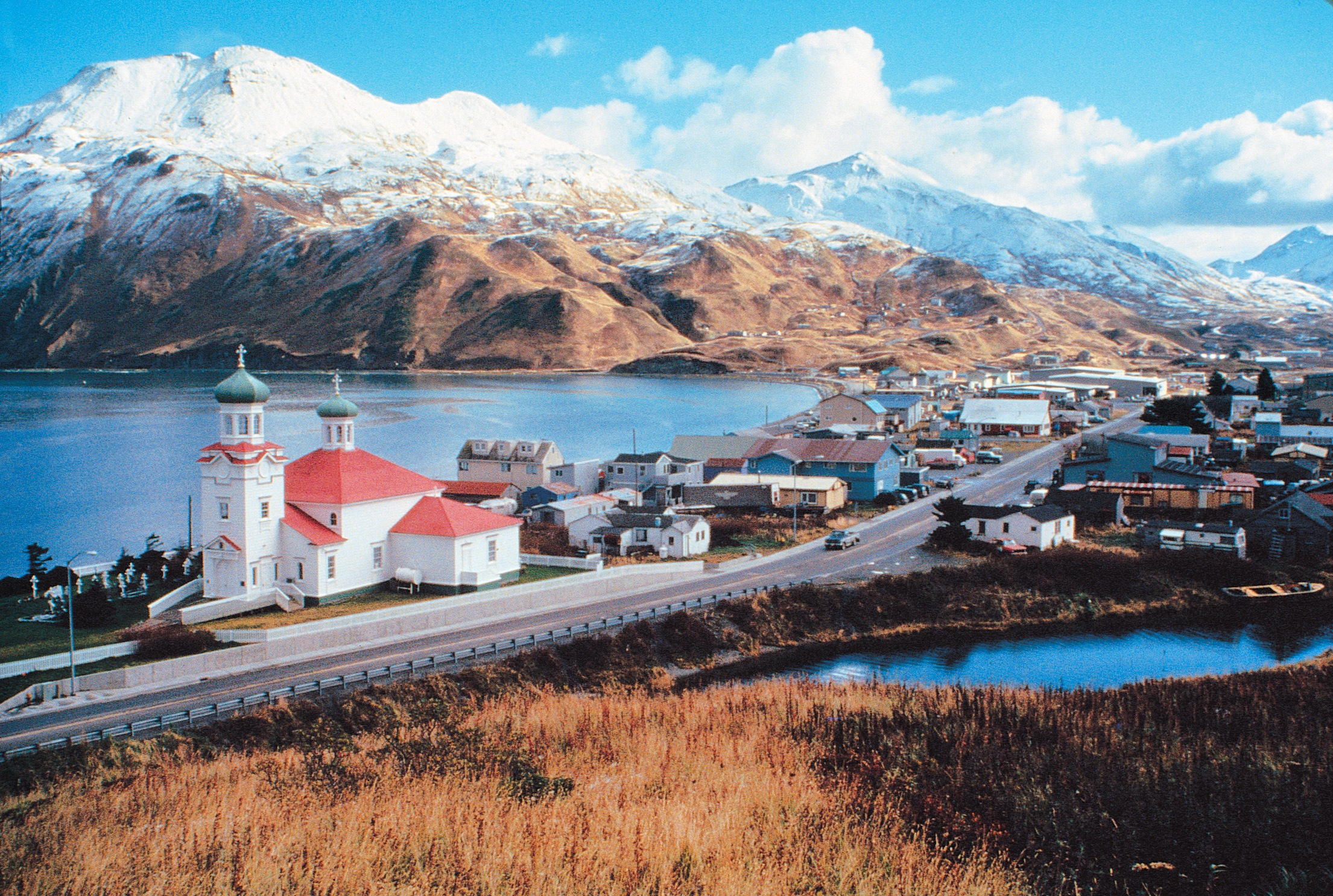
Unalaska in the Aleutian Islands

In the last week of May 1936, Hutchison left Scotland for Montreal, whence she travelled to Winnipeg and finally Seattle, where she caught the Yukon for a journey along the coast reaching Seward. She found that the information she had been given about ships and sailing times in Washington was theoretical, so had to adapt accordingly. She had booked a passage on the Starr, but this would be three weeks late, so she also booked on the Curaçao. This took her overnight to Kodiak, Alaska, where she booked into the Sunbeam Hotel. In the two weeks she spent waiting for the Starr's arrival, she explored the area and collected specimens. The Starr turned out to be quite a scruffy ship with limited room in the cabins, though she met several old friends whom she had got to know from her time on the north coast of Alaska.

At Unalaska she disembarked, as this was the limit of the Starr's voyage. She knew that she would have to trust to her luck to get any further west by small fishing and trading boats. She became well known in the area through her participation in the local church. Luckily, a small schooner called the Penguin was travelling on to St George Island, and she quickly booked a passage. She also managed to obtain further passage through her friend Commodore Ralf Dempwolf, who arranged transport for her on a cutter called the Chelan.

She continued her journey on the Penguin to Saint Paul Island, where she collected more specimens and took cine pictures of seals and their harems. She received a radio message that she could be picked up there by the Chelan and had to climb up a rope ladder to get on board. Because of the articles she had written in the National Geographic and other well-respected publications, she had quite a standing in the naval community. Once on board, she was treated handsomely and given a large cabin to herself. She dined with the officers, and the chef spent much time preparing high-quality meals for her. The ship had a duty to inspect Bogoslof Island each year, as it was constantly changing its shape. Hutchison was unable to land there due to the sea condition, but she took cine pictures of it. They then passed Umnak Island and the Island of the Four Mountains. Their first stop was at At, where the Aleut people had been living for over 2000 years. As well as collecting plants she was interested in everything about the inhabitants' way of life. Quite often, a member of the crew was detailed to look after Hutchison and help her collect specimens.

The ship continued westward to the isle of Amchitka. A submerged mountain range had been discovered here and the ship needed to chart it. The Chelan spent a week charting the waters round this area, which varied from 49 to 4,000 fathoms (90 to 7,315 m), and had caused the losses of several coastguard ships.

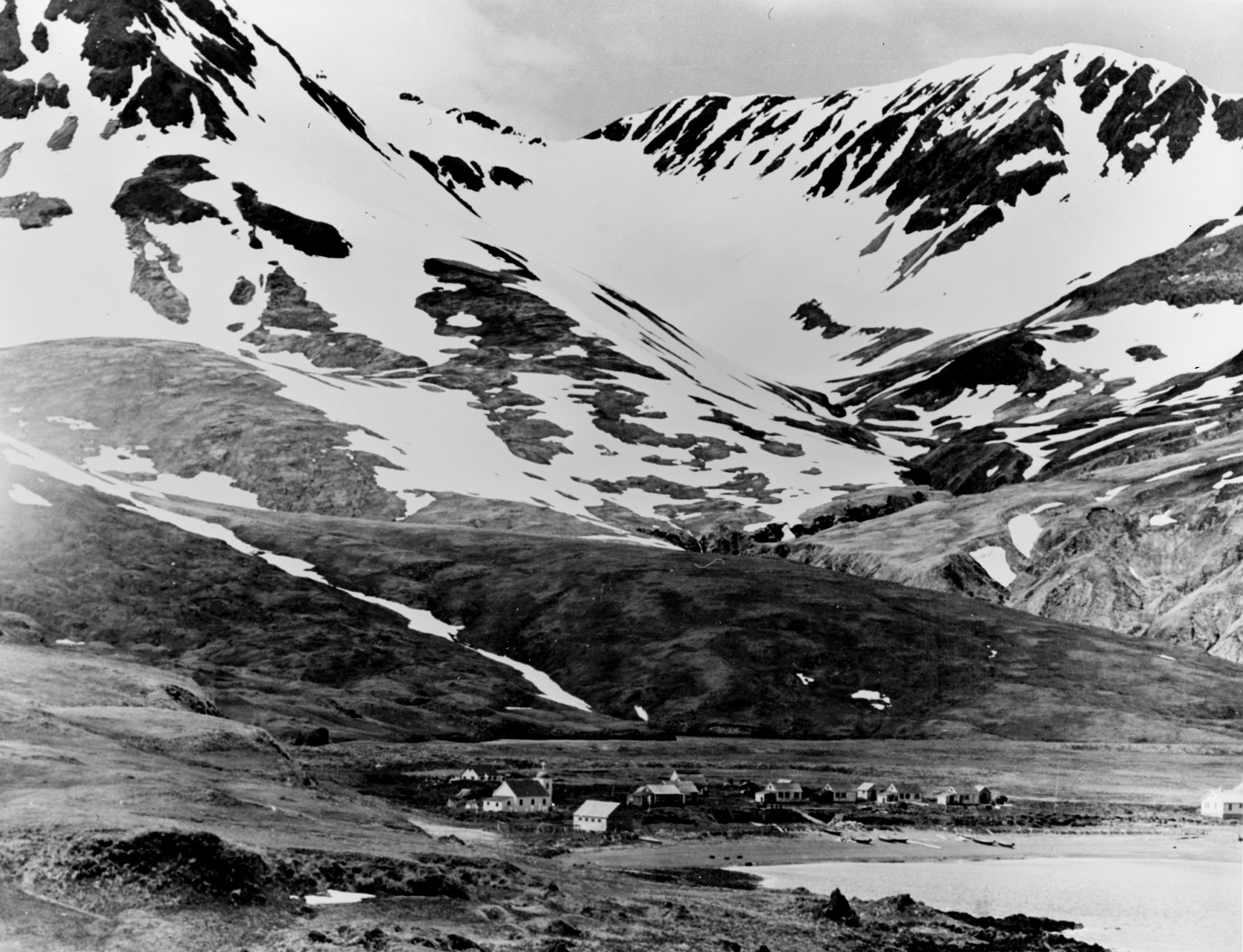
Attu village in June 1937

Hutchison wanted, if possible, to land on Attu. For two days, this was impossible, but on the third day, it was safe to anchor and for her to go ashore with two sailors. If the weather got worse, they would be left onshore until the ship could come back. They worked hard and found 69 plants.

The people of Attu were friendly, and Hutchison often photographed them. Six years later, the Japanese attacked this island and killed many people. The rest were taken to a prison camp in Japan, where many died.

The ship then went on to Kiska, which had an American naval base. They stayed there several days, and Hutchison was able to climb the mountain south of the harbour, where she took photos, collected specimens, and wrote a poem. The Chelan then set sail back east. She had spent three weeks on board with a group of 90 sailors and had travelled 1000 miles in some of the most dangerous seas in the world. They were obviously impressed by her, as they made her an admiral's pennant inscribed with "Isobel Hutchison, Admiral of the Bering". When she got back to Alaska, she managed to visit nearly all her old friends and show them photos of her latest adventures.

== Non-Arctic adventures ==
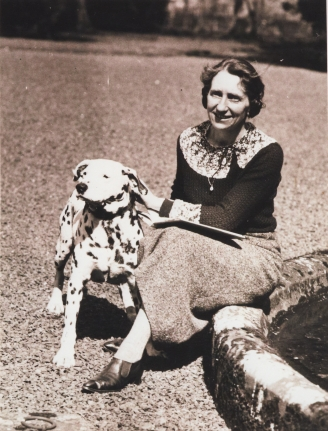
Isobel Wylie Hutchison at home with her dog

Hutchison carried on traveling for the rest of her life, recording a number of her travels for the National Geographic.

- 1936: Japan, China, Trans-Siberian Railway, Moscow, Poland, Berlin
- 1938: Estonia
- 1946: Denmark
- 1948: "stroll" from Carlowrie to London
- 1950: "stroll" from Innsbruck to Venice
- 1952: "stroll" from Edinburgh to John o' Groats

In the late 1950s, she only made short journeys to Europe, as well as leading a National Trust cruise to the Fair Isle and St Kilda. By the '60s she had largely stopped travelling, but still cycled over 200 miles (320 km) from Carlowrie to Bettyhill, riding 40 miles (64 km) a day.

== Other activities ==
After the Japanese invasion of Attu Island in 1942, Hutchison became a frequent speaker on the BBC. Carlowrie was run down after being used by the RAF during the war, and she needed money for repairs and upgrades. Electricity was not installed until 1951.

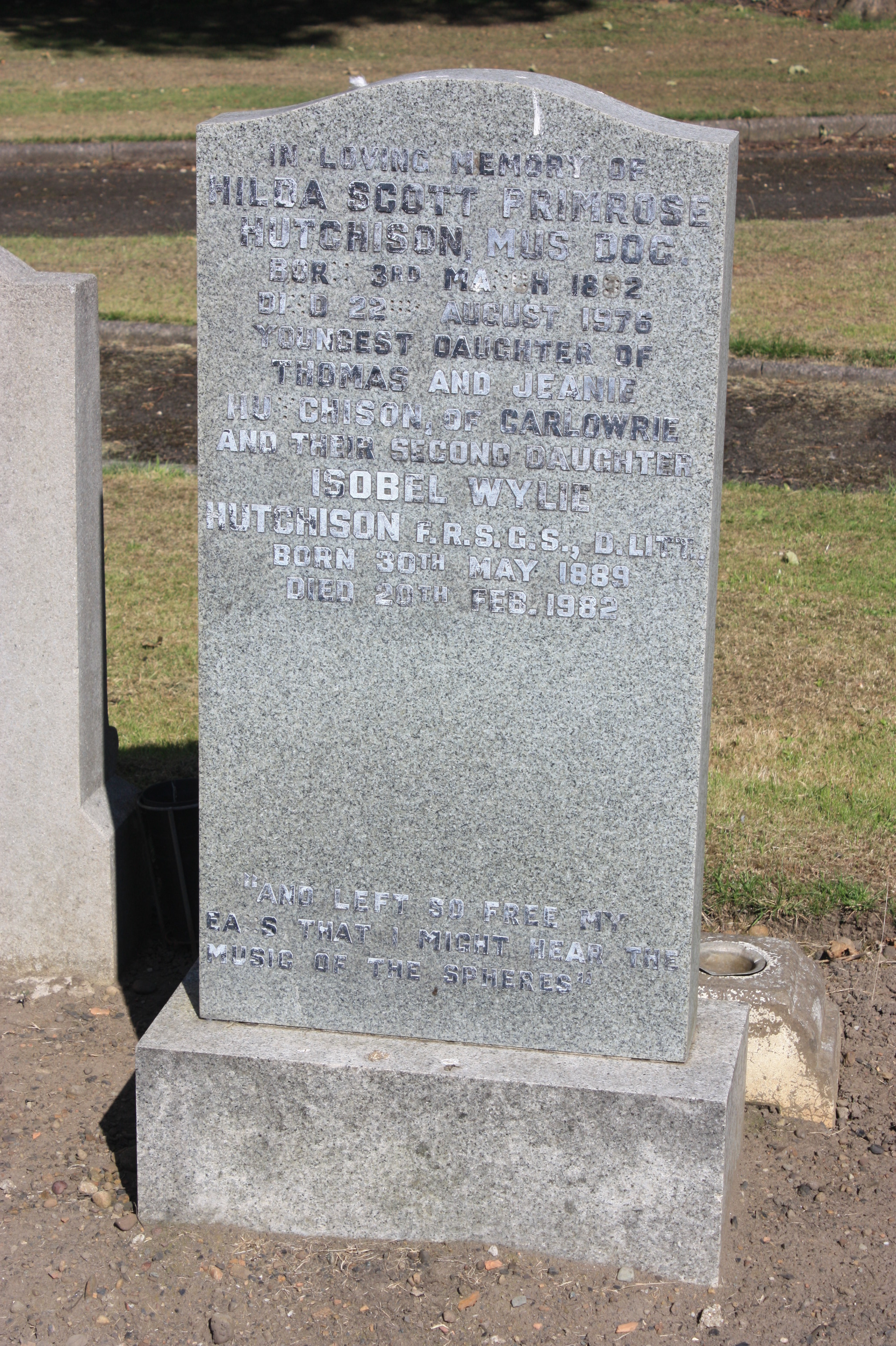
The grave of Isobel Wylie Hutchison, Kirkliston Cemetery

In the summer of 1956, Hutchison helped to organise visits by National Geographic photographers, B. Anthony Stewart and David S. Boyer, to Falkland Palace, Abernethy, Kinross, Kirriemuir, and Braemar to illustrate her article "A Stroll to John o'Groats". In the same year, along with Kathleen Revis, the National Geographic's first female staff photographer, she toured Scotland, visiting locations for a feature on the country's literary landmarks.

== Death ==
In later life, Hutchison suffered from arthritis, which eventually became debilitating. Hutchison died at home at Carlowrie on 20 February 1982, aged 92. She is buried in the northern cemetery in Kirkliston, with her mother and her eldest sister, Hilda Scott Primrose Hutchison.

== Academic honours and awards ==
Isobel Wylie Hutchison was a valued member of the Royal Scottish Geographical Society. She served on its council from 1936 to 1940, as honorary editor of the Scottish Geographical Magazine from 1944 to 1953, and as the society's vice president from 1958 to 1970.

She was awarded the society's Fellowship Diploma in 1932, and the Mungo Park Medal on 24 October 1934, to her great surprise. She was the third person and the first woman to receive the award.

In 1936, she was made a fellow of the Royal Geographical Society of London. The University of St Andrews conferred on her the degree of Doctor of Laws in 1949.

== Legacy ==
Although she is less well known than many of her male contemporaries within the fields of exploration and botany, Isobel Wylie Hutchison's achievements are nonetheless extraordinary. She explored widely and largely independently at a time when women were not expected to venture beyond the domestic sphere, and when their achievements were often dismissed or minimized. One reporter went so far as to write of her:

"Miss Hutchison is, you feel, much too fragile and gentle for the rigours of Arctic exploration. Dispensing tea in her sunlit sitting room, or sketching the glowing colours of her garden, she seems far more in her correct setting than battling against cold and hardship in half-civilised lands." The Scotsman, 2 November 1939.

She gave over 500 lectures during the course of her life. The plant specimens she collected were sent to Kew Gardens, the Royal Botanic Garden Edinburgh and the British Museum. Her diaries, papers, photographs, films, and other materials are held in the collections of the National Library of Scotlandf the Mitchell Library in Glasgow and the Royal Scottish Geographical Society. Some of the artefacts she collected are on display in the National Museum of Scotland and the Scott Polar Research Institute, University of Cambridge.

Her life is documented at Carlowrie Castle, her family home. She is honoured with a blue plaque at Carlowrie Castle. Carlowrie Castle worked with the Royal Scottish Geographical Society and Edinburgh-based bespoke design studio Craft Design House to launch The Isobel Wylie Hutchison Collection, in honor of her 130th birthday.

In November 2022, Hutchison's work featured in the GLEAN exhibition at Edinburgh's City Art Centre of 14 early women photographers working in Scotland. The photographs and films also included Helen Biggar, Violet Banks, Christina Broom, Mary Ethel Muir Donaldson, Johanna Kissling, Margaret Fay Shaw, and Margaret Watkins

== Books and articles ==
Hutchison wrote six books of poems, seven books on her travels, and 12 articles for National Geographic.

=== Poetry ===
- Lyrics from West Lothian. Private publication, 1916
- How Joy was found: A Fantasy in Verse in Five Acts. London: Blackie; New York: Frederick A. Stokes, 1917
- The Calling of the Bride. Stirling: E. Mackay, 1926
- The Song of the Bride. London: De La More, 1927
- The Northern Gate. London: De La More, 1927
- Lyrics from Greenland. London: Blackie, 1935

=== Prose ===
- Original Companions. London: Bodley Head, 1929
- The Eagle's Gift: Alaska Eskimo Tales. New York: Doubleday Doran, 1932
- Flowers and Farming in Greenland. Edinburgh: T. A. Constable, 1930
- On Greenland’s Closed Shore: The Fairyland of the Arctic. Edinburgh: William Blackwood, 1930
- North to the Rime-Ringed Sun: Being a Record of an Alaska-Canadian Journey Made in 1933-34. London: Blackie, 1934, 1935; New York: Hillman-Curl, 1937
- With August Masik: Arctic Nights Entertainment: Being the Narrative of an Alaskan Estonian Digger, August Masik, as told to Isobel Wylie Hutchison. Glasgow: Blackie, 1935
- Stepping Stones from Alaska to Asia. London: Blackie, 1937

=== Articles ===
National Geographic:

- "Walking Tour across Iceland", April 1928
- "Riddle of the Aleutians", December 1942
- "Scotland in Wartime", June 1943
- "Wales in Wartime", June 1944
- "Bonnie Scotland, Post-war Style", May 1946
- "2000 Miles through Europe’s Oldest Kingdom", February 1949
- "A Stroll to London", August 1950
- "A Stroll to Venice", September 1951
- "Shetland and Orkney, Britain’s Far North", October 1953
- "From Barra to Butt in the Hebrides", October 1954
- "A Stroll to John o' Groats", July 1956
- "Poets' Voices Linger in Scottish Shrines", October 1957

Hutchison also had several other articles published in journals and newspapers.

In 2022, Peak Beyond Peak: The Unpublished Scottish Journeys of Isobel Wylie Hutchison, compiled and transcribed by Hazel Buchan Cameron, was published by Taproot Press.

== Sources ==
- Hoyle, Gwyneth (2001). Flowers in the Snow: The Life of Isobel Wylie Hutchison. Nebraska University Press. ISBN 0-8032-2403-6. OCLC 53687410.
