= Peter Hutchison =

British public official, businessman, and botanist (1935–2019)

Sir Peter Craft Hutchison of Rossie, 2nd Baronet, CBE, FRSE (5 June 1935 – 20 January 2019) was a British public official, businessman and botanist. The son of the army officer, politician and company director Sir James Hutchison, 1st Baronet, he was educated at Magdalene College, Cambridge, and then served in the Queen's Own Lowland Yeomanry. He inherited the baronetcy in 1979 and worked in the family business, Hutchison and Craft, where he was chairman until 1996. He was chairman of the Royal Botanic Garden in Edinburgh from 1985 to 1996, overseeing renovation and expansion projects and the gardens' increasing reputation for research quality. He personally travelled widely in search of rare plant species. He was also chairman of the Forestry Commission from 1994 to 2001.
