= Sir Robert Hutchison, 1st Baronet =

Scottish physician (1871–1960)

Sir Robert Hutchison FRCP Bt
- Born: 28 October 1871; Kirkliston, Scotland
- Died: 12 February 1960 (aged 88); Streatley, Berkshire, England
- Education: University of Edinburgh
- Known for: His books Clinical Methods, Food and the Principles of Dietetics and his petition "From inability to let well alone..."
- Spouse: Dr Laetitia Nora Ede
- Scientific career
- Fields: Medicine; Paediatrics
- Workplaces: Hospital for Sick Children, London, Royal London Hospital

Sir Robert Hutchison, 1st Baronet, FRCP Bt (28 October 1871 – 12 February 1960) was a Scottish physician and paediatrician, and the original editor of the medical books, Clinical Methods and Food and the Principles of Dietetics.

He was a consultant paediatrician at the Hospital for Sick Children, Great Ormond Street, London and general physician at the Royal London Hospital. He served as president of the Royal Society of Medicine and the Royal College of Physicians and was created 1st Baronet Hutchison, of Thurle, Parish of Streatley, Berkshire (UK) in 1939.

== Early life and education ==
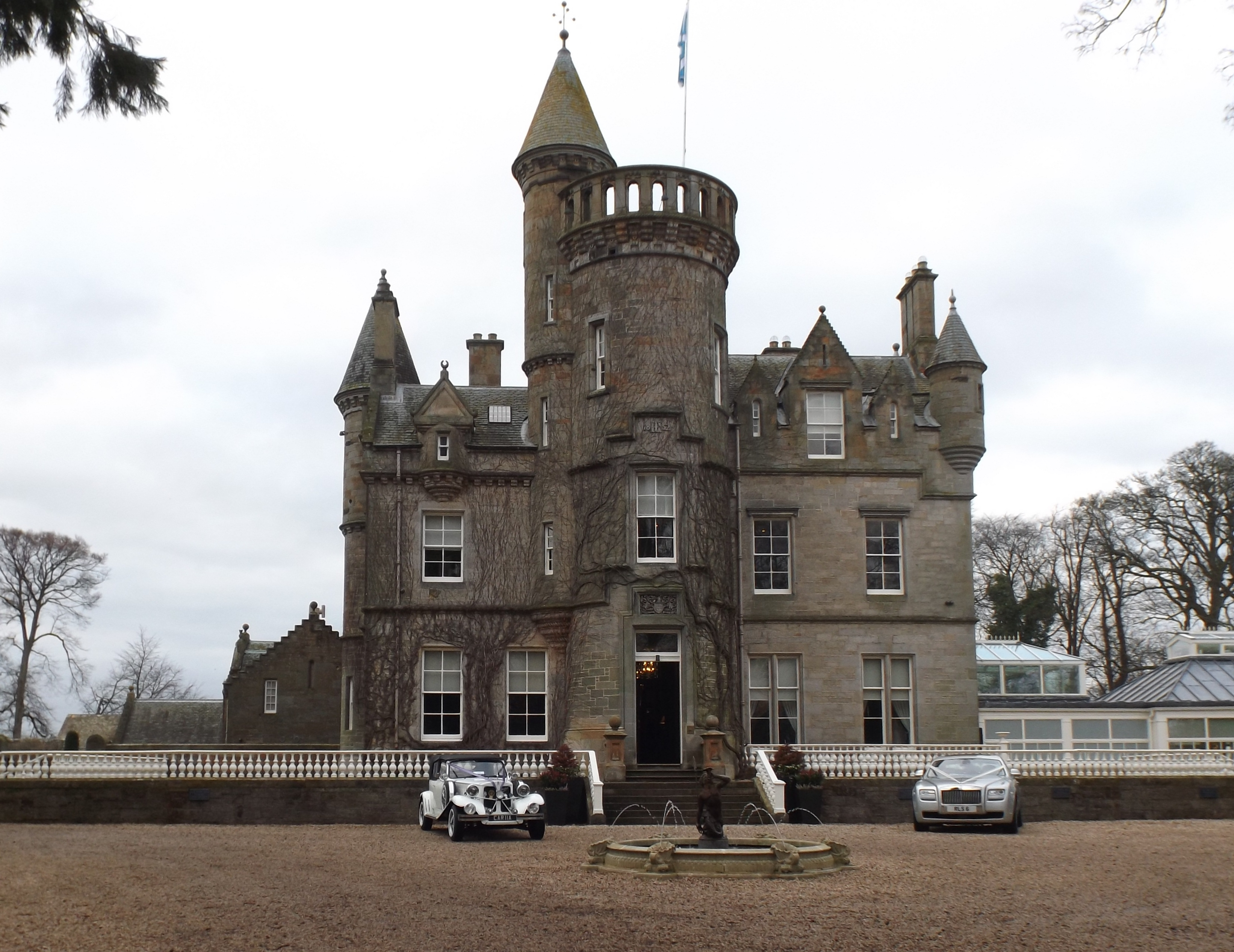
Carlowrie Castle, built by the Hutchison family in the mid 19th century.

Robert Hutchison was born on 28 October 1871 at Carlowrie Castle east of Kirkliston, and west of Edinburgh in Scotland to Robert Hutchison of Carlowrie FRSE and his wife, Mary Jemima Tait. He was the youngest of seven children. His father was a wine merchant, who, having a good knowledge of forestry, had authored a number of papers, and was also a fellow of the Royal Society of Edinburgh. His mother, Mary Jemima, was the daughter of Rev Adam Duncan Tait, minister of Kirkliston.

Hutchison had his school education at Edinburgh Collegiate School, and then joined the University of Edinburgh in 1889 for his medical education. He graduated with first class honours and medals in all subjects except physics in 1893, and also gained the Ettles Scholarship. He was then posted as house resident in various departments including the Paediatrics department at the Hospital for Sick Children, Great Ormond Street, London. He later visited Strasbourg and Paris for his studies, and later was appointed to a junior post in the department of chemical pathology in Edinburgh. His essay on “The clinical estimation of the alkalinity of the blood” was awarded the Edinburgh University London Club Prize in August, 1895, and he obtained his MD degree and MRCP (Ed) in 1896.

== Professional career ==
Hutchison was then posted as a resident at the Hospital for Sick Children, London in 1896, and then at the Physiology department of the London Hospital, in which he remained till 1900. There, he worked under Dr Leonard Erskine Hill, a British physician and physiologist. He was also appointed as house physician to Sir Thomas Barlow at the Hospital for Sick Children in 1897. Later, he was appointed as full physician to the Royal London Hospital and to the Hospital for Sick Children in 1900, after having served as Assistant Physician to the London Hospital for about six years. He was elected a Fellow of the Royal College of Physicians in 1903. During World War I, he served as medical advisor to the Ministry of Food.

He was one of the founding editors of the Quarterly Journal of Medicine which was established in 1907.

== Teaching ==
Hutchison is remembered by his students for his "ability to express in concise and fastidious language his extraordinary powers of clinical observation". Whilst teaching his students at the bed-side, he was known to be witty, which sometimes seemingly "reached towards sadism". Nevertheless, he was respected and loved by his students who were "entranced by his incisive comments on ward-rounds", and were attracted to "his individual method of teaching", which they found "was really in part a pose, an assumption of cynicism, that failed to hide a mind that was intellectually gay and a heart that felt deeply for all human suffering, especially the sufferings of children".

== Honours and recognitions ==
In 1904 he delivered the Goulstonian lectures on anaemia of infancy to the Royal College of Physicians and in 1931 gave their Harveian Oration. In 1931 he was made Hon FRCP (Ed). He also received the LLD of University of Edinburgh and University of Birmingham, the Hon DSc of University of Oxford and the Hon MD of University of Melbourne. He was the president of the Royal Society of Medicine from 1934 to 1935 and of the Royal College of Physicians from 1938 to 1941.

On 6 July 1939 he was created the 1st Baronet Hutchison, of Thurle, Parish of Streatley, Berkshire (UK). In 1951 the Archives of Disease in Childhood, an international peer-reviewed journal for health professionals and researchers on childhood illnesses, published an issue in his honour.

== Published works ==
Hutchison wrote Clinical Methods, which he first published in 1897, while working as Assistant Physician in the Royal London Hospital. He subsequently saw through the next 13 editions of the book, with the help, for the first eight editions, of Dr Harry Rainy MA FRCP (Ed) FRSE, who was a tutor of Clinical Medicine at the Royal Infirmary of Edinburgh, and later with Donald Hunter, a British physician, and then from 1949, with Hunter and Dr Richard Bomford. The 13th edition was published in 1956 by Hunter and Bomford without Hutchison's assistance. The book has been translated into many languages. The book is considered a standard book of reference on clinical skills for medical students, and is now in its 24th edition.

His book, the Food and the Principles of Dietetics, was published in 1900. In 1904, he also published a book on paediatric diseases, the "Lectures on Diseases of Children". In 1951, marking Dr Hutchison's 80th birthday, the Archives of Disease in Childhood, a peer reviewed medical journal, listed his 14 books and 260 other writings on paediatric subjects in its issue.

== Personal life ==
The Hutchisons lived in London until 1940, when their home was bombed in the Nazi air-raid on London. They moved to Streatley in Berkshire after that.

Dr Hutchison had to undergo a gastrojejunostomy at the age of 48 in 1929, for a duodenal ulcer with which he had been suffering for about 20 years. Four years later, he developed Progressive muscular atrophy, which caused weakness of his muscles. He retired from hospital practice in 1934. He died in 1960 at the age of 88.

In 1905 Dr Hutchison had married Dr Laetitia Nora Ede, the daughter of Rev. William Moore Ede and a newly qualified doctor at The London Hospital. They had five children. One child died at birth, and a son who was a medical student at the University of Oxford, died of an infection that he contracted in the anatomy lab. He was survived by two sons and one daughter.

== Personality ==
Hutchison was tall, gaunt and appeared rather stooping. His students found his wit to be "caustic" sometimes, reaching "towards sadism in such alliterative condemnations of themselves as a curious collection of crapulous cretins creeping from crib to crib", and making "a newcomer cringe with such reminders as that 'he was percussing a child’s lung not the cellars in the basement'". Yet, his students respected and admired him because, they "sensed that his individual method of teaching was really in part a pose, an assumption of cynicism, that failed to hide a mind that was intellectually gay and a heart that felt deeply for all human suffering, especially the sufferings of children, though seldom for the sufferings of a candidate for the College Membership".

Many of Hutchison's clinical sayings became popular with his contemporaries and future generations. One Hutchison wrote in 1953 as a petition to God:

"From inability to let well alone;
from too much zeal for the new and contempt for what is old;
from putting knowledge before wisdom, science before art, and cleverness before common sense;
from treating patients as cases;
and from making the cure of the disease more grievous than the endurance of the same,
Good Lord, deliver us."

Donald Paterson, a British physician who had helped to found the British Paediatric Association in 1928, and had worked with Hutchison, wrote after his death, "In Robert Hutchison Scotland presented to England a young man who was destined to become a superb physician, an eminent scholar, a great writer, a most inspiring teacher, a shrewd and gifted clinician, and above all a most kindly gentleman... (who) remained always modest and unassuming... (and) inspired real affection in those with whom he worked. His shafts of wit sent home his teaching points and his powers of instruction inspired a large number of physicians and paediatricians ... (He was) a tall, slightly stooping, rather gaunt figure, dignified and somewhat austere, but a little sorrowful...".

== See also ==
- Hutchison baronets
- Goulstonian lectures
- Harveian Oration
- Sir Stanley Davidson, the original editor of the medical textbook, "Davidson's Principles and Practice of Medicine".

Academic offices
Preceded by The Viscount Dawson of Penn	President of the Royal College of Physicians; 1938–1940	Succeeded by The Lord Moran
Baronetage of the United Kingdom
New creation	Baronet (of Thurle); 1939–1960	Succeeded by Peter Hutchison
