= Thomas Setzer Hutchison =

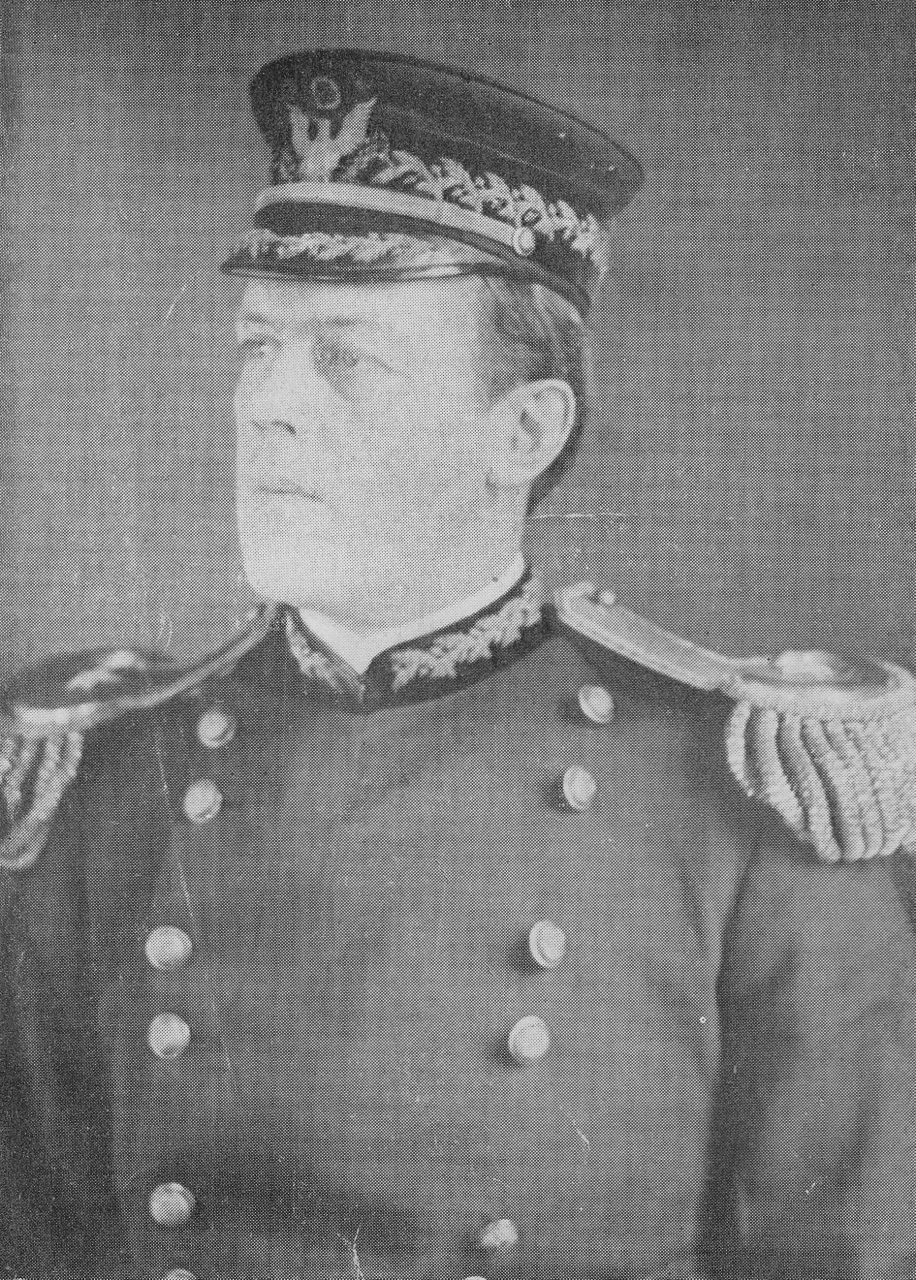
- Thomas Setzer Hutchison; Photo circa 1903
- Born: October 29, 1875; Nashville, Tennessee
- Died: March 11, 1936 (aged 60); Nashville, Tennessee
- Burial place: Spring Hill Cemetery, Nashville
- Military career
- Allegiance: United States of America; Kingdom of Greece
- Branch: Artillery (Tennessee); Infantry (Tennessee); Artillery (Kingdom of Greece)
- Service years: 1892–1898: Washington Artillery, Tennessee; 1898: 2nd Regiment of Infantry, Tennessee; 1898–1903: 5th Regiment, Tennessee; 1912–1913: 15th Regiment of Greek Infantry, Greece
- Rank: Captain (Tennessee); Lieutenant-Colonel (Tennessee); Colonel (Tennessee); Brigadier General (Tennessee); Major of Artillery, (Garibaldi Legion, Greece)
- Conflicts: Spanish–American War; Battle of Bizani

Thomas Setzer Hutchison (29 October 1875 – 11 March 1936) was an American military officer, volunteer officer in Greece, police commissioner, civil reformer, author and inventor.

== Military service ==
Son of J. H. Hutchison and Suzen Powell; brother of Albert Hutchison. At 17 years of age, Thomas Setzer Hutchison joined the Washington Artillery of Tennessee as a private soldier, and saw service in the mountains of East Tennessee during the mining troubles. He was quickly promoted through all of the ranks of his battery from Gun Corporal, to Gun Sergeant, to Quartermaster-Sergeant, and finally to First Sergeant. Hutchison received commissions as Second Lieutenant of the Artillery by Tennessee Governor Robert Love Taylor (in office 1887 to 1891), and shortly after Captain and given a new artillery battery. With the outbreak of the Spanish–American War in April 1898, Hutchison was transferred to the Second Regiment of Infantry as Captain of Company D and served with distinction during that conflict. After the war, he was discharged and returned to his home in Tennessee, where Governor Benton McMillin (in office 1899 to 1903) commissioned him as Captain of Company K of the Fifth Regiment. After only a few days, Hutchison was commissioned Lieutenant-Colonel and a week later, promoted to Colonel of that regiment (at 22 years of age). He served as Colonel for five years and during that time commanded all of the troops of Tennessee, as he was the ranking officer of the State. During this time Hutchison wrote the rules and regulations of that governed the military forces of Tennessee. After serving continuously for nine years he voluntarily went on retirement as a Brigadier-General.

== Civilian career ==
The new Governor of Tennessee, Malcolm R. Patterson (in office 1907 to 1911), appointed Hutchison as the Commissary General of Tennessee and also a member of his personal military staff. About the same time, the Mayor of Nashville appointed Hutchison to the board of Civil Service Commissioners, and confirmed by the City Council on October 25, 1907 as a Police Commissioner of the city, in which capacity he made new rules and regulations for the police. Concerned about the need to regulate cruelty to animals and to protect and care for the youth and children of the city, Hutchison went before the Legislature of Tennessee and his testimony resulted in a commission being created to address those issues. Hutchison joined the commission resulting in concrete reforms in Nashville that targeted cruel drivers of animals and organized a Juvenile Court.

== Volunteer soldier in Greece ==
Hutchison was a supporter of the Progressive Party and he became interested in the struggle in the Balkans after a visit to New York on business. He departed New York on 13 November 1912 aboard the American vessel Laura and arrived in Greece on 27 November 1912. Hutchison was immediately commissioned a Major of Artillery in the Garibaldi Legion and joined the Greek Army during the First Balkan War. After meeting Greek Prime Minister Eleftherios Venizelos, Hutchison was sent to Epirus with the Fifteenth Regiment of Greek Infantry and some eight batteries of artillery, as part of the Army of Epirus. Hutchison participated in the various battles and assaults on the Turkish fort of Bizani, during which he was wounded. Following the Greek victory and the fall of Ioannina, Hutchison was one of a staff of officers who escorted 2,700 Turkish prisoners to Corfu. After the war in Epirus, Hutchison returned to Nashville, where he was celebrated by the Greek-American community of that town. In 1913, he published his memoires of the Epirus campaign entitled An American Soldier Under the Greek Flag at Bezanie.

== Inventions ==
Hutchison was also an inventor. On 19 July 1927, he was awarded U.S. patent number "US1636637 A" for the design of a "Combination Tool", a combined measuring and gauging implement for use by mechanics, carpenters and metal workers. He would create several coin-operated games in his later life including the game Steeplechase distributed by Keeney & Sons and the early pinball table Scram.

== Death ==
Hutchison died on March 11, 1936. He is buried in Spring Hill Cemetery in Nashville.
