= Robert Hutchison of Carlowrie =

Scottish landowner, landscape photographer and arboriculturalist (1834–1894)

Robert Hutchison of Carlowrie FRSE
- Born: 3 October 1834; Leith, Edinburgh, Scotland
- Died: 25 February 1894 (aged 59); Brodick, Isle of Arran, North Ayrshire, Scotland
- Resting place: Kirkliston Churchyard
- Occupations: Landowner; landscape photographer; arboriculturalist
- Years active: 1852–1894
- Spouse: Mary Jemima Tait (m. 1863)
- Children: 8, including Thomas and Robert
- Relatives: Isobel Wylie Hutchison (niece)

Robert Hutchison of Carlowrie FRSE (3 October 1834 – 25 February 1894) was a Scottish landowner, landscape photographer and arboriculturalist. He was President of the Royal Scottish Arboricultural Society from 1864 to 1871.

== Early life ==
Hutchinson was born on 3 October 1834 in Leith, Edinburgh.

== Career ==
He followed his father into the wine trade in Leith and inherited the family business in 1852, at the age of 18, on his father's death.

His father had commissioned the building of Carlowrie Castle, near Kirkliston, from the Edinburgh architect David Rhind. The project was inherited by Hutchinson and completed in 1855.

In 1864, he was elected a Fellow of the Royal Society of Edinburgh, in recognition of his expertise in forestry, his proposer being William Stevenson. In 1866, he is listed as a member of the Edinburgh Botanical Society alongside Arthur Abney Walker.

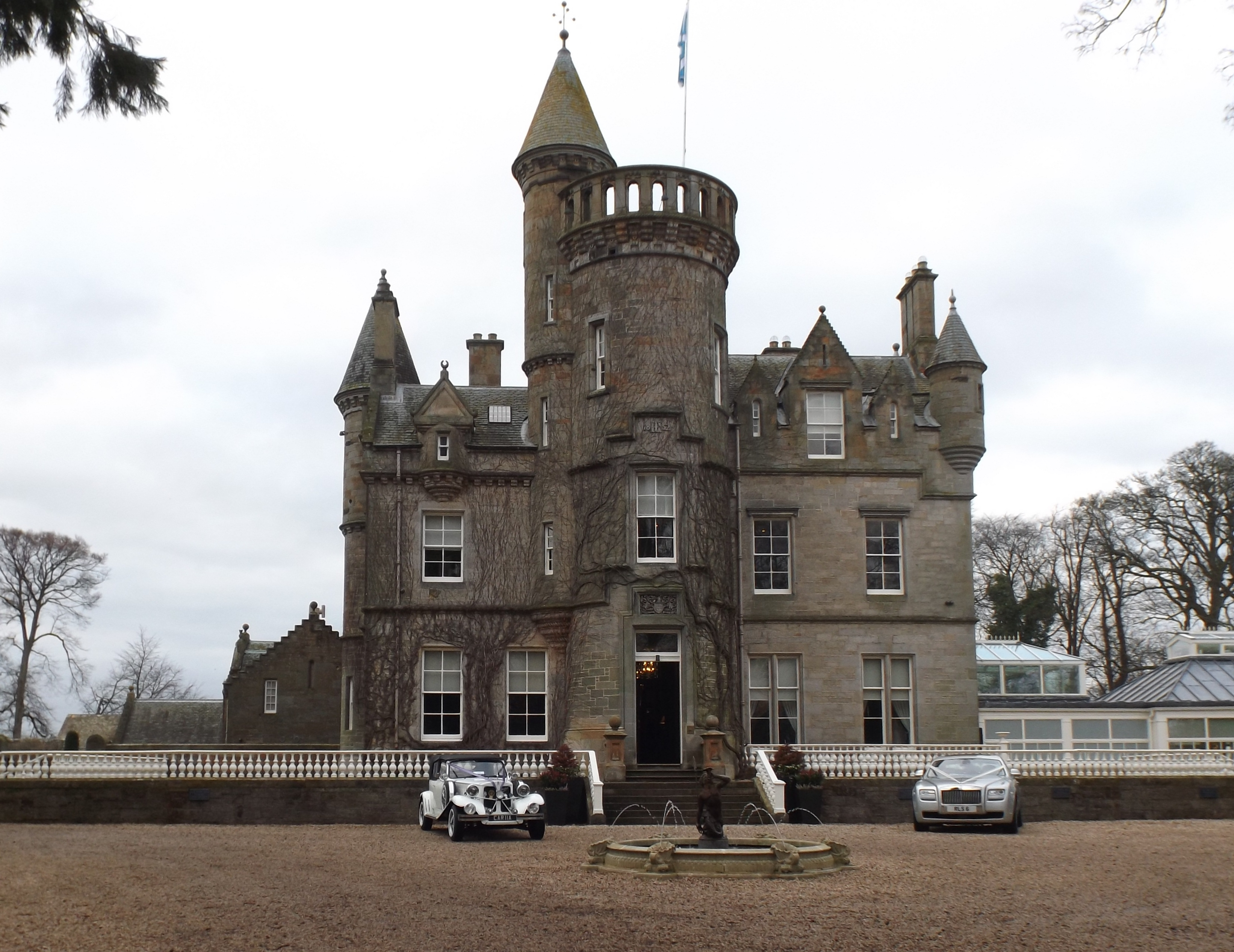
Carlowrie Castle, built by the Hutchison family 1852-5

In 1880, he was one of the five founders of Craiglockhart Church.

== Personal life and death ==
In 1863, he married Mary Jemima Tait, daughter of Reverend Adam Duncan Tait. They had eight children.

His niece was the female explorer and adventurer, Isobel Wylie Hutchison.

He died in Brodick on the Isle of Arran on 25 February 1894.
