= Mary Hutchison =

- Born: Mary Casey; 18 January 1915; Edinburgh
- Died: 1 October 1994 (aged 79); Edinburgh
- Known for: National President of Scottish Co-operative Women’s Guild

Mary Hutchison (née Casey) (18 January 1915 – 1 October 1994) was the National President of the Scottish Co-operative Women’s Guild.

She grew up in the south of Edinburgh and was one of three daughters born to Catherine Sinclair and Michael Casey. After leaving school, she worked in upholstery. In 1938, she married Lawrence Hutchison, a foreman joiner, and she gave birth to three daughters.

In the early 1960s, Hutchison joined the Craigmillar Branch of Scottish Co-operative Women’s Guild (SCWG), taking advantage opportunities for working women unavailable anywhere else at the time. She attended business classes run by the SCWG. She started a youth club with vital support from the St. Cuthbert’s Co-operative Association Education Committee.
