= Hutchison baronets =

Baronetcy in the Baronetage of the United Kingdom

There have been three baronetcies created for persons with the surname Hutchison, all in the Baronetage of the United Kingdom. Two creations are extant as of 2010.

The Hutchison Baronetcy, of Hardiston in the County of Kinross, was created in the Baronetage of the United Kingdom on 23 July 1923 for Thomas Hutchison, Lord Provost of Edinburgh, from 1921 to 1923. The title became extinct on the death of the second Baronet in 1972.

The Hutchison Baronetcy, of Thurle in Streatley in the County of Berkshire, was created in the Baronetage of the United Kingdom on 6 July 1939 for Robert Hutchison, President of the Royal Society of Medicine and of the Royal College of Physicians. As of 2010 the title is held by his grandson, the third Baronet, who succeeded his father in 1998.

The Hutchison Baronetcy, of Rossie in the County of Perth, was created in the Baronetage of the United Kingdom on 26 January 1956 for James Hutchison, Conservative Member of Parliament for Glasgow Central and Glasgow Scotstoun. His son, the second Baronet, Peter Craft Hutchison (for more information follow this link), was a botanist and chair of Forestry Commission Scotland. . As of 2019, the title is held by his son, the third baronet, who succeeded in that year.

== Hutchison baronets, of Hardiston (1923) ==
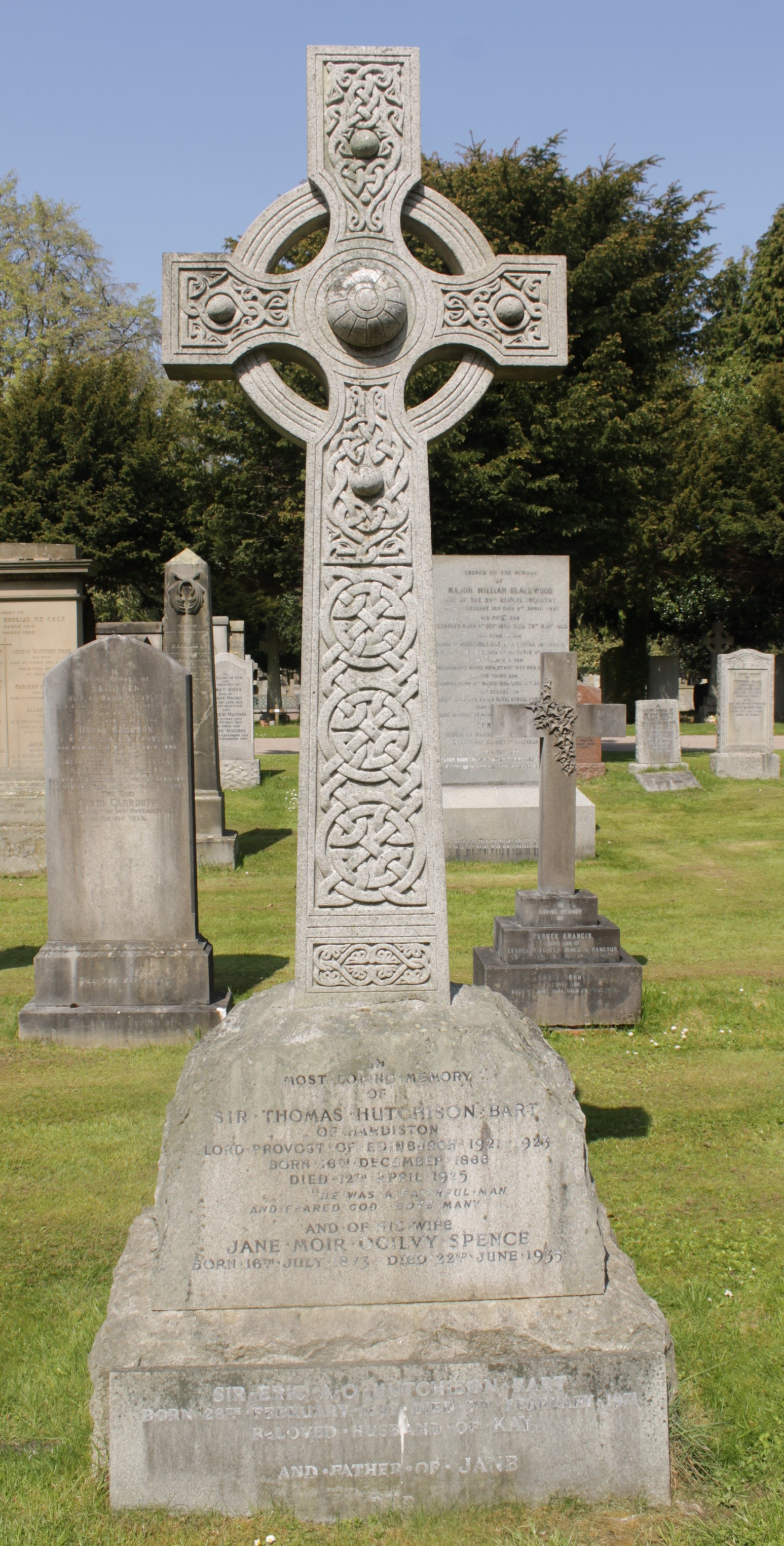
The grave of Thomas and Eric Hutchison, Dean Cemetery

- Sir Thomas Hutchison, 1st Baronet (1866–1925) Lord Provost of Edinburgh 1921–3
- Sir Eric Alexander Ogilvy Hutchison, 2nd Baronet (1897–1972)

== Hutchison baronets, of Thurle (1939) ==
- Sir Robert Hutchison, 1st Baronet (1871–1960)
- Sir Peter Hutchison, 2nd Baronet (1907–1998)
- Sir Robert Hutchison, 3rd Baronet (b. 1954)

The heir apparent is the present holder's son Hugo Thomas Alexander Hutchison (born 1988).

== Hutchison baronets, of Rossie (1956) ==
- Sir James Riley Holt Hutchison, 1st Baronet (1893–1979)
- Sir Peter Craft Hutchison, 2nd Baronet (1935–2019)
- Sir James Colville Hutchison, 3rd Baronet (b. 1967)

The heir apparent is the present holder's son Harry Leo Peter Hutchison (born 1998).
