= Werner Kissling =

German photographer and ethnographer

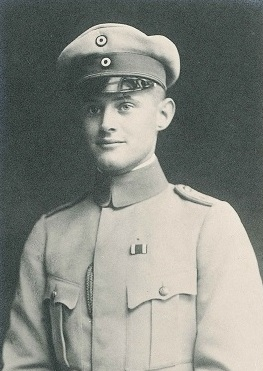
- after volunteering in 1914
- Born: 11 April 1895; Wrocław, German Empire
- Died: 3 February 1988 (aged 92); Dumfries, Scotland
- Occupations: Soldier, diplomat, ethnographer
- Parent: Johanna Kissling

Werner Friedrich Theodor Kissling (or Kißling) (11 April 1895 – 3 February 1988) was an ethnographer and photographer. His mother, Johanna, was a photographer and she was a central figure in his life. They were both noted for their work in Scotland.

Werner studied the Scottish crofters of Eriskay and South Uist, the farmers and fisherfolk of Dumfries and Galloway, the Māori of New Zealand, and the culture of North Yorkshire.

Kissling was born into an aristocratic, land-owning family but spent his multimillion-pound inheritance and died in a Dumfries care home. In his twenties, as a young German diplomat, he was rich, had social status and apparently had an assured career; he chose to pursue his interests in ethnography and photography.

Kissling is known for the short film Eriskay: A Poem of Remote Lives, which is based on his footage, shot in 1934, of crofting life on the island of Eriskay in the Western Isles. His mother, Johanna, was also a photographer and a central figure in his life. In 1905, she had toured the Western Isles (the Outer Hebrides and St Kilda) and from there had sent a postcard to her 10-year-old son, Werner, back in Germany. When Kissling died, 83 years later, that same postcard would still be in his possession, found in his single suitcase in his room.

== Early life and career ==
Kissling was born on 11 April 1895, near Breslau in Silesia, then part of the German Empire, today in Poland. Kissling was the second son of a wealthy, aristocratic family of land-owners and brewers. His mother was Johanna Kissling and his father was the great grandson of the founder of the wealthy brewing family, Conrad Kissling KG, established in Breslau in 1835.

Kissling went to school in Breslau and Leobschütz (now, Głubczyce in Poland), spending much of his youth in the 'Marshes', an 18th-century palace in the village of Heinzendorf (now Bagno, in Poland). Bagno Palace was acquired by Kissling's father in 1905, who extended and refurbished the building. The 'Marshes' remained in the family until 1927, when his older brother by two years, Georg Conrad, who was running the business by this time, was forced to sell it, due to financial difficulties. The German Salvatorians acquired the palace in 1930, but it is now owned and run by the Polish Salvatorians. After service in both the Prussian Army cavalry and the Imperial German Navy during World War I, Kissling studied international law and history at the Friedrich-Wilhelm University in Berlin, and at the University of Königsberg (now Kaliningrad in Russia). He then pursued a diplomatic career for the new Weimar Republic, training at the Consular School in Vienna. His first German Foreign Office posting was in Latvia, where he took his earliest surviving photographs. Other postings took him to Spain, Hungary, Switzerland and the UK. He was also part of the German delegation to the League of Nations.

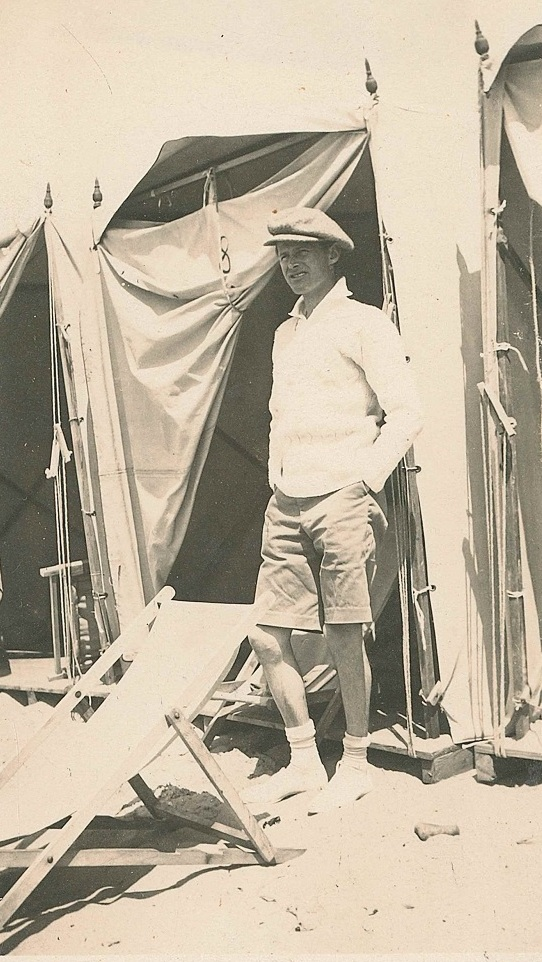
Kissler as a diplomat in Wales in 1929

In 1931, Kissling came to Britain as Second Secretary in the German embassy in London. This would be his last diplomatic posting and Kissling would never see Germany again. The rise of the Nazi Party in the Weimar Republic continued to distress him and after Adolf Hitler's National Revolution in 1933, Kissling was forced to resign his position at the German embassy. Ralph Coleman, a librarian in Dumfries, where Kissling would eventually settle, relates : "After Kissling resigned, Hitler rang to tell him his regiment needed him. Werner told him that his regiment no longer existed. Hitler told him that he was a traitor to Germany, but he replied he might be a traitor to Hitler, but not to his country". Kissling moved to Cambridge, having acquired the position as ‘Keeper of Collections’ at the Museum of Archaeology and Ethnology.

Less than a year later, however, with Hitler's intelligence services keeping him under surveillance, Kissling decided to move on. Borrowing a friend's yacht, Elspeth, and armed with his Leica III 35mm rangefinder camera and a cine camera, he set sail for sanctuary in the Western Isles of Scotland, a place he had visited in previous years. Kissling was particularly interested in the architecture of the traditional house, and the Hebridean blackhouse of the Western Isles would feature prominently in his work. Indeed, he would spend 3 months living in such a house with its limited facilities, light years away from what he would have been accustomed to back in his ancestral home in Germany. During this period, in the Outer Hebrides, as well as taking hundreds of photographs, Kissling filmed some footage of daily life in the islands, footage which would form the basis of the film Eriskay: A Poem of Remote Lives.

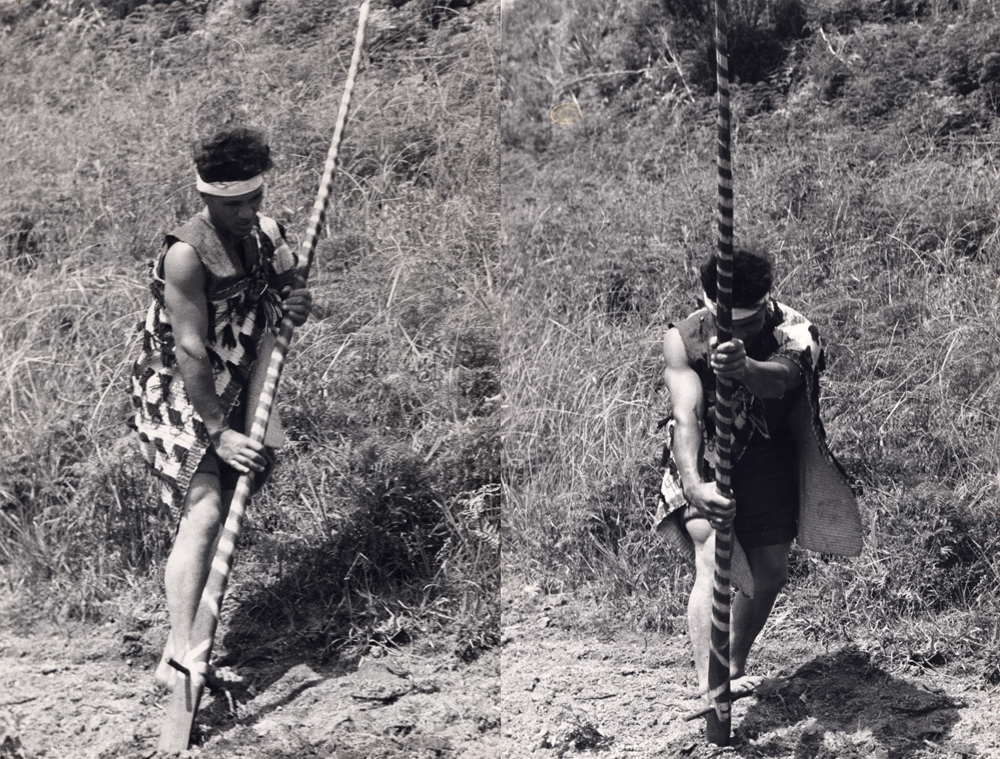
Dr Werner Kissling's 1939 photo of a Māori man from the Ngāpuhi iwi using a kō (foot plough)

Four years later, in 1938, Kissling made an enthnographic field trip to New Zealand, financed by himself, where he photographed the traditional skills of the Māori peoples. Over 400 of these photos are in the British Museum's collections. He is reported to have recorded a film of the Māori peoples, but, the film has not been located. When he returned to Britain in 1939, at the start of World War II, Kissling, being a former German diplomat, was interned in the Tower of London. Kissling's anti-Nazi opinions were already well known to the British authorities and even though he was transferred to an internment camp on the Isle of Man, he was promoted to a welfare officer for fellow German internees. He was released in 1942 and returned to Cambridge to continue his ethnographic work.

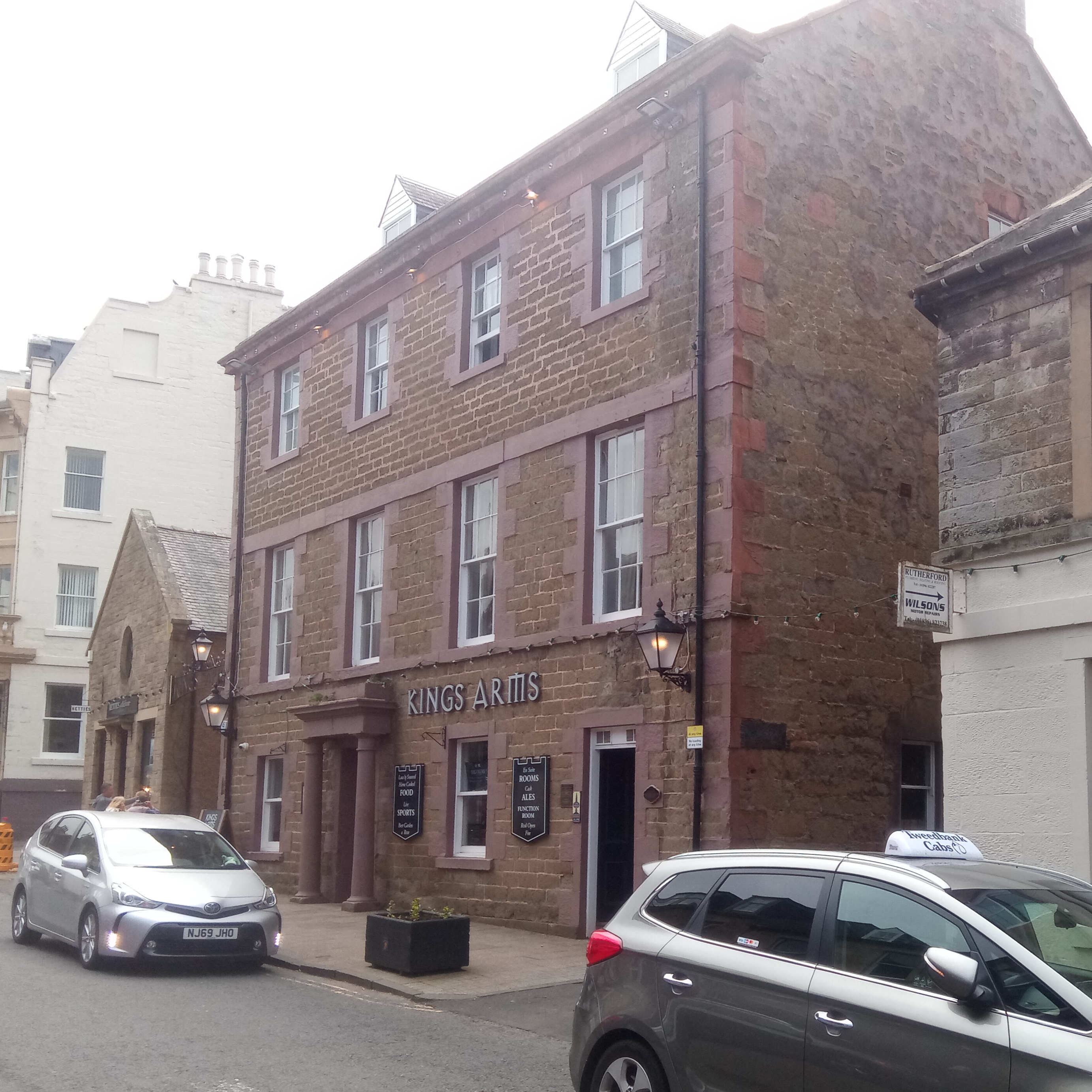
The Kings Arms Hotel in Melrose was owned by his mother

In 1944, Kissling's brother, Georg Conrad Kissling, an officer in the Wehrmacht, committed suicide, before he could be arrested by the Nazis for his part in the 20 July plot to assassinate Hitler and overthrow the Nazi single party state. In 1945, Kissling managed to get his mother, Johanna, smuggled out of Germany with the family fortune of around £2m. The fortune, though, was not well managed, and most of it would be gone by the time of his mother's death, 16 years later, after a failed venture into the hotel business in 1952, when he bought the Kings Arms Hotel in Melrose in the Scottish Borders. Between 1952 and 1961, Kissling earned a living as a part-time writer and photographer for the School of Scottish Studies, photographing traditional skills in the Hebrides, the Scottish Borders and south-western Scotland. From 1962 to 1966, Kissling would journey to North Yorkshire for three months each summer to undertake photographic fieldwork for the University of Leeds. During 1967, Kissling mainly worked as a part-time research archivist at the English Institute of Dialect and Folk Life Studies.

In 1968, Kissling settled in Dumfries, where he spent the last 20 years of his life, working as an anthropologist and photographer for the town's Burgh Museum, basing himself in a lean-to out-building. In addition, he continued to contribute to the Camera Obscura collection. The silver-haired Kissling would tour the country in his battered old van, photographing traditional rural crafts and collecting many traditional artefacts. During this period, he supplemented his income, selling photographs and negatives, with many examples of his work now held in various collections.

== Eriskay: A Poem of Remote Lives ==
Kissling spent the summer of 1934 on the island of Eriskay in the Western Isles of Scotland. As well as taking many photographs, he also filmed the traditional way of life on the island. This footage presents the residents of the island at the time (1934), observing them as they go about their season-dependent daily routines. There are scenes of peat collecting, sheep shearing and dipping, and repairing of fishing nets. In addition we are presented with scenes of the various stages in the manufacture of tweel (tweed), including the collecting of crottle ("or lichen, as it is known elsewhere"), and the ‘waulking of the tweed’.

These views of the islanders at work are intermingled with panoramic shots of the island and its bays, including shots of the Eriskay fishing boats, as they head off to the fishing grounds, the Eriskay Pony, and Kissling's own yacht, Elspeth.

The film was edited to raise funds for the people of Eriskay. Kissling was always concerned with the plight of the islanders including the expansion of the road network and the water supply. The resultant film was entitled Eriskay: A Poem of Remote Lives and comprised 15m 40s of the original silent, black-and-white footage. An introduction was added, together with sound, featuring narration, Scottish traditional music and conversations in Scottish Gaelic.

Kissling's film formed the centre-piece of a "Hebridean Evening", hosted at the Marquess of Londonderry’s London residence, on Tuesday, 30 April 1935, in the presence of the Prince of Wales, Queen Mary of Teck, Prime Minister of the United Kingdom Ramsay MacDonald, Macleod of Macleod and Cameron of Lochiel. The funds raised were used to build Eriskay’s first major road, running from the old pier at Haunn in the north to the harbour at Acairseid in the south. While the roads have long since been upgraded, part of the old road, Rathad Kissling ("Kissling Street"), still survives near Acairseid.

Although the film aroused considerable interest at the time, afterwards it lay forgotten in the archives of the School of Scottish Studies until the late 1970s.

== Death ==
Werner Kissling died penniless, on 3 February 1988 at the Moorheads Nursing Home in Dumfries, leaving behind him one of the most extensive photographic records of the Scottish Hebrides ever made. In his room, was found a single suitcase, filled with personal papers, photographs and lantern slides reflecting his involvement with the people of the Western Isles. Also, in the suitcase was a postcard sent by his mother from the Isle of Lewis in 1905, which must have inspired in Kissling a love of the Hebrides which was to last until his death.

Kissling was buried in the town's St Michael's kirkyard in an unmarked grave, a stone's throw from that of Robert Burns. Two years after his death, Ralph Coleman, the Dumfries librarian, organised a public subscription for a gravestone. £500 was raised to finance a simple granite headstone, inscribed with the words: SOLDIER, DIPLOMAT, SCHOLAR, GENTLEMAN. Coleman comments: “The epitaph is fitting. That's what he was – an amazing man with a depth of perception which allowed him to see what Nazism meant to Europe”.

Alfred Truckell, ex-curator of the Dumfries museum, describes Kissling as ”a brilliant man whose interests were wide-ranging and of international importance”. He says: “He took some magnificent photographs, one of which I thought was sheer brilliance. It was of the advance of the Red Army over the bridge at Riga. He made a splendid film on the Māoris of New Zealand, and he spent three months in a black house getting an insight into crofting life.”

He was a private man who wished no public recognition for himself or his work while he was alive. "He considered his research to be a race against time, and he only gave up when forced by ill-health and crippling arthritis," Mr David Lockwood, the Dumfries museum curator, wrote in Kissling's obituary.

BBC Alba commissioned a documentary on Werner Kissling from Argyll-based 'Eala Bhan'. Michael Russell, chief executive of the Scottish National Party, produced the film which was entitled, "Kissling – Duin' Ioma Fhillte", and was first broadcast in November 2009.

== His mother's legacy ==
In November 2022, his mother, Johanna Kissler's work featured in the GLEAN exhibition at Edinburgh's City Art Centre of 14 early women photographers working in Scotland. The photographs and films that were curated by Jenny Brownrigg were by Helen Biggar, Violet Banks, Christina Broom, Mary Ethel Muir Donaldson, Dr Beatrice Garvie, Jenny Gilbertson, Isabel Frances Grant, Ruby Grierson, Marion Grierson, Isobel Wylie Hutchison, Johanna Kissling, Isabell Burton-MacKenzie, Margaret Fay Shaw and Margaret Watkins

== Films ==
Eriskay: A Poem of Remote Lives, 1934 (see video in External Links)

== Collections ==
- Dumfries Museum
- Dr Kissling's life and family photographs
- A 1978 exhibition of Dr Kissling's photographs with his own original captions
- Dr Kissling's photographs of blacksmithing in Dumfries and Galloway
- British Museum – New Zealand Photographs and Negatives
- Leeds Archive of Vernacular Culture – Yorkshire
- The Māori photographs of Werner Kissling by Amiria Salmond
- Haddon Photographic Collection

== Publications ==
- The Character and purpose of the Hebridean Black House J.R.A.I., Vol. LXXIII, Royal Anthropological Institute, 1943
- Kissling, Werner: 'House Traditions in the Outer Hebrides. The Black House and the Beehive Hut',

Man, Vol. XLIV, 1944
