= Beatrice Garvie =

British doctor and photographer (1872-1956)

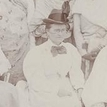
- Born: 9 May 1872; Perth
- Died: 1956 (aged 83–84)
- Occupation: Physician, photographer, missionary

Beatrice Garvie (1872–1956) was a Scottish doctor who is known for her photography on the Scottish island of North Ronaldsay. She was one of the first women to become a doctor in Scotland and she worked as a missionary in India.

== Life ==
Garvie was born in Perth to a middle-class family. Her family employed two servants. Garvie was one of the first women to train to be a doctor in Scotland by taking the Triple Qualification. The British Medical Journal reported in 1891 that she was in the list of successful students who had passed the exams of the Royal College of Physicians and Surgeons in Edinburgh.

When she had qualified she went to be a missionary in Rajputana. She was able to work with women in the Zenana.

In 1896 the Lancet recorded that Dr Beatrice Garvie L.R.C.P. L.R.C.S. had been appointed as clinical assistant at the Samaritan Hospital in Glasgow.

In 1913 she was working in Rotherham.

== North Ronaldsay ==
In the early 1930s, at the end of her career, she and her housekeeper and partner, Charlotte Tulloch, came to live together in "The Bungalow" on the island of North Ronaldsay when Garvie was nearly sixty. She was part of the community for sixteen years and in that time the transportation to the island improved when the first airstrip was built. Her transportation was a bicycle that frequently featured in her photographs. She took photographs and gave them to people. There are over 500 of her photos in Orkney Library.

Garvie is remembered for the work that she did on the island but she has come to notice because of her skill and interest in photography. She was the island's doctor.

She retired at the age of 74 and she and Tulloch left North Ronaldsay. She was living at a private hotel in Auchterarder after the war.

== Death and legacy ==
Garvie died in 1956. Her photographs are copyright until 2026.

In November 2022 Garvie's photograph's featured in the GLEAN exhibition at Edinburgh's City Art Centre of 14 early women photographers working in Scotland. The photographs and films that were curated by Jenny Brownrigg were by Helen Biggar, Violet Banks, Christina Broom, M.E.M. Donaldson, Jenny Gilbertson, Isabel Frances Grant, Ruby Grierson, Marion Grierson, Isobel Wylie Hutchison, Johanna Kissling, Isabell Burton-MacKenzie, Margaret Fay Shaw, Margaret Watkins and Garvie.
