= Jenny Gilbertson =

Scottish documentary and educational filmmaker

- c.1932
- Born: Jenny Brown; 28 October 1902; Glasgow, Scotland, United Kingdom
- Died: 8 January 1990 (aged 87); Shetland, Scotland, United Kingdom
- Occupation: Filmmaker

Jenny Gilbertson (born Jenny Brown; 28 October 1902 – 8 January 1990) was a Scottish documentary and educational filmmaker.

== Early life and education ==
Jenny Gilbertson was born on 28 October 1902, in Glasgow, Scotland; the only daughter of Mary Dunn Wright, and an iron merchant, William Brown. She studied at Laurel Bank School, then furthered her education at Glasgow University where she earned an MA in teaching. Her relationship with films started after she went to London for a secretarial course in journalism in 1929. She concluded that educational and documentary style filmmaking was for her after she saw an amateur film about the Scottish Loch Lomond in London; which resulted in her purchasing her first 16mm camera.

Gilbertson chose Shetland as her first subject as she had been taken there by her family as a child. Gilbertson met native Shetlander farmer Johnny Gilbertson while filming one of her earlier films, Rugged Island: A Shetland Lyric (1933), where Gilbertson played the lead in the story-documentary film. They married shortly after the completion of the film, in 1934. She experienced a halt in her filmmaking career until the 1960s, due to the birth of her and her husbands two daughters, the distant location of Shetland, and World War II. It was not until after retiring from a teacher position that she entered her second phase of filmmaking.

== Career ==
Following her purchase of a 16mm camera, Gilbertson went to the archipelagos of Shetland in 1931. This is when she made her first film A Crofter's Life in Shetland and invited Scottish documentary maker John Grierson to watch it. Grierson was impressed with her work and supported her by encouraging her to purchase a more advanced camera. She then purchased a 35mm Eyemo, and made five more films in Shetland; all of which Grierson bought for the GPO Film Unit (General Post Office Film Unit). Following which Gilbertson toured Britain and Canada, lecturing on her film The Rugged Island: A Shetland Lyric. She made one film with Evelyn Spice Cherry, Prairie Winter, (1934).

During her hiatus after the lecture tours, the Gilbertsons ran a small hosiery business in their hometown of Shetland in the 1940s. Later in 1947 Jenny Gilbertson accepted a temporary teaching position at the local Urafirth Primary School, which turned her supposed temporary employment into two decades. However, she revisited filmmaking after retiring from teaching in 1967, and returned to Canada soon after, where she made films for the Canadian Broadcasting Company. The revival of her filmmaking career was largely due to her husband's sudden death earlier in the year. Ideally returning to filmmaking in the 1970s, Gilbertson spent vast lengths of time in Arctic Canada producing some of her last works. People of Many Lands, Jenny's Arctic Diary: Part I and II, and Walrus Hunt were some of her later films that were sold to British and Canadian broadcasters, including the Canadian Museum of History. She also made a further film about Shetland, People of Many Lands- Shetland with Elizabeth Balneaves, which was broadcast by the BBC in October 1967.

All the films Gilbertson had made during her filmmaking career were focused on embracing nature, farming life, fishing, families that did such activities and anything that captured the environment she was in.

== Filmography ==
Year	Title	Length
1931	A Crofter's Life in Shetland	46 Minutes
1932	A Cattle Sale	3 Minutes
1932	Da Makkin O' A Keshie	5 Minutes
1932	In Sheep's Clothing	10 Minutes
1932	Scenes From A Shetland Croft Life	7 Minutes
1932	A Young Ganet	3 Minutes
1932	Seabirds in The Shetland Islands	9 Minutes
1933	The Rugged Island: A Shetland Lyric	56 Minutes
1940	Northern Outpost	16 Minutes
1949	Big Timber	10 Minutes
1952	Among The Clouds	9 Minutes
1967	People of Many Lands	20 Minutes
1969	Shetland Pony	31 Minutes
1972	Jenny's Arctic Diary Part I	30 Minutes
1975	Jenny's Dog Team Journey	25 Minutes
1978	Jenny's Arctic Diary (Part II)	60 Minutes
	Walrus Hunt	13 Minutes
1983	Rovdehorn	13 Minutes

== Legacy ==
Jenny Gilbertson left behind her feat of the one-woman show; she wrote, directed, lighted, staged, filmed and edited all her films by herself and was successful in doing so. Over twenty of her completed films, silent and with sound, black and white and in colour can now be found in the Shetland Museum, Scottish Screen Archive, British Film Institute, and Canadian Museum of History.

In November 2022 Banks' work featured in the GLEAN exhibition at Edinburgh's City Art Centre of 14 early women photographers working in Scotland. The photographs and films that were curated by Jenny Brownrigg were by Gilbertson, Helen Biggar, Violet Banks, Christina Broom, M.E.M. Donaldson, Dr Beatrice Garvie, Isabel Frances Grant, Ruby Grierson, Marion Grierson, Isobel Wylie Hutchison, Johanna Kissling, Isabell Burton-MacKenzie, Margaret Fay Shaw and Margaret Watkins
