= Biggar (surname) =

Biggar is a surname of Scottish origin. People with the surname include:

- Alastair Biggar (1946–2016), Scottish rugby union player
- Alexander Biggar (disambiguation), multiple people
- Ann-Maree Biggar (born 1967), Australian television presenter
- Billy Biggar (1874–1935), English footballer
- Dan Biggar (born 1989), Welsh rugby union player
- Helen Biggar (1909–1953), Scottish sculptor and filmmaker
- Henry Percival Biggar (1872–1938), Canadian historian
- Herbert Biggar (1809–1892), Canadian merchant and politician
- James Lyons Biggar (1824–1879), Canadian merchant and politician
- James Lyons Biggar (1856–1922), Canadian soldier
- John Biggar (Scottish politician) (1874–1943), Scottish politician
- John Walter Scott Biggar (1843–1897), Canadian farmer and politician
- Joseph Biggar (c. 1828–1890), Irish politician
- Kyle Biggar (born 1986), Scottish biologist
- Margaret Catherine Biggar Blaikie (1823–1915), Scottish temperance reformer
- Mike Biggar (born 1949), Scottish rugby union player
- Murray Biggar, Canadian politician
- Nigel Biggar (born 1955), British theologian and priest
- Oliver Mowat Biggar (1876–1948), Canadian lawyer and civil servant
- Paula Biggar, Canadian politician
- Sanford Dennis Biggar, Canadian politician
- William Hodgins Biggar (1852–1922), Canadian lawyer and politician

== See also ==
- Baldwin of Biggar, mid 12th century Scottish magnate
- Biggar family, pioneer traders at Port Natal in the early 19th century
- Bigger (disambiguation)
