= Johanna Kissling =

Scottish based photograoher

- Johanna Kissling sitting on a chair inside The King's Arms Hotel, Melrose
- Born: 1875; Germany
- Died: 1961 (aged 85–86); Melrose, Scotland
- Known for: Pioneer photographer
- Notable work: St Kilda series – 1905
- Movement: Pioneer Era
- Children: Georg Conrad Kissling, Werner Friedrich Theodor Kissling

Johanna Kissling (or Kißling) (1875, Germany – 1961, Melrose, Scotland) was a pioneer German photographer based in Scotland. The main work that is preserved was taken in St Kilda and Lewis around 1905 when she traveled as a tourist. She lived in Scotland with her son, the ethnographer and photographer Werner Kissling. They were both noted for their work in Scotland.

== Early life and career ==
Johanna Kissling was born in Germany in 1875 into an aristocratic, land-owning family. She married the great grandson of the founder of a wealthy brewing family, Conrad Kissling KG (established in Breslau in 1835). They had their first born, Georg Conrad Kissling in 1893, and their second son Werner Friedrich Theodor Kissling in 1895 near Breslau in Silesia, then part of the German Empire, today in Poland. In 1905, she had toured the Western Isles (the Outer Hebrides and St Kilda) and from there had sent a postcard to her 10-year-old son, Werner, back in Germany. When Kissling died, 83 years later, that same postcard would still be in his possession, found in his single suitcase in his room. In St Kilda and Outer Hebrides she took her own photographs that now are held at Dumfries Museum Collection.

The same year, the 'Marshes', an 18th-century palace in the village of Heinzendorf (now Bagno, in Poland) was acquired by Johanna's husband where their children spent much of their youth with them. They extended and refurbished the building that remained in the family until 1927, when her older son, Georg Conrad, who was running the business by this time, was forced to sell it, due to financial difficulties. The German Salvatorians acquired the palace in 1930, but it is now owned and run by the Polish Salvatorians.

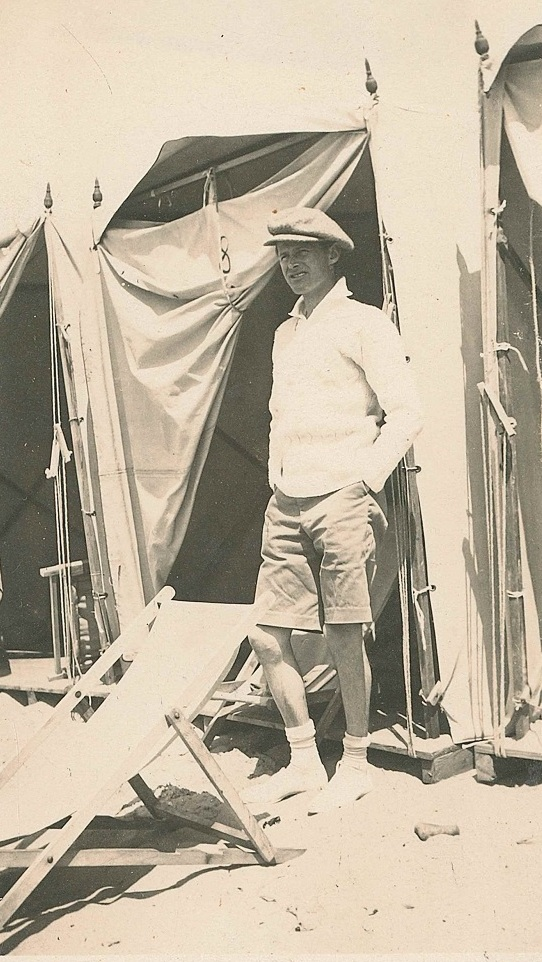
Kissler's son as a diplomat in Wales in 1929

Werner, her second child, after service in both the Prussian Army cavalry and the Imperial German Navy during World War I, pursued a diplomatic career for the new Weimar Republic, training at the Consular School in Vienna. His first German Foreign Office posting was in Latvia then Spain, Hungary, Switzerland and the UK as Second Secretary in the German embassy in London. This would be his last diplomatic posting and Kissling would never see Germany again. The rise of the Nazi Party in the Weimar Republic continued to distress the family and after Adolf Hitler's National Revolution in 1933, Kissling was forced to resign his position at the German embassy. Kissling moved to Cambridge, having acquired the position as ‘Keeper of Collections’ at the Museum of Archaeology and Ethnology but he continued travelling taking photos.

In 1944, Kissling's oldest son, Georg Conrad Kissling, an officer in the Wehrmacht took his own life, before he could be arrested by the Nazis for his part in the 20 July plot to assassinate Hitler and overthrow the Nazi single party state.

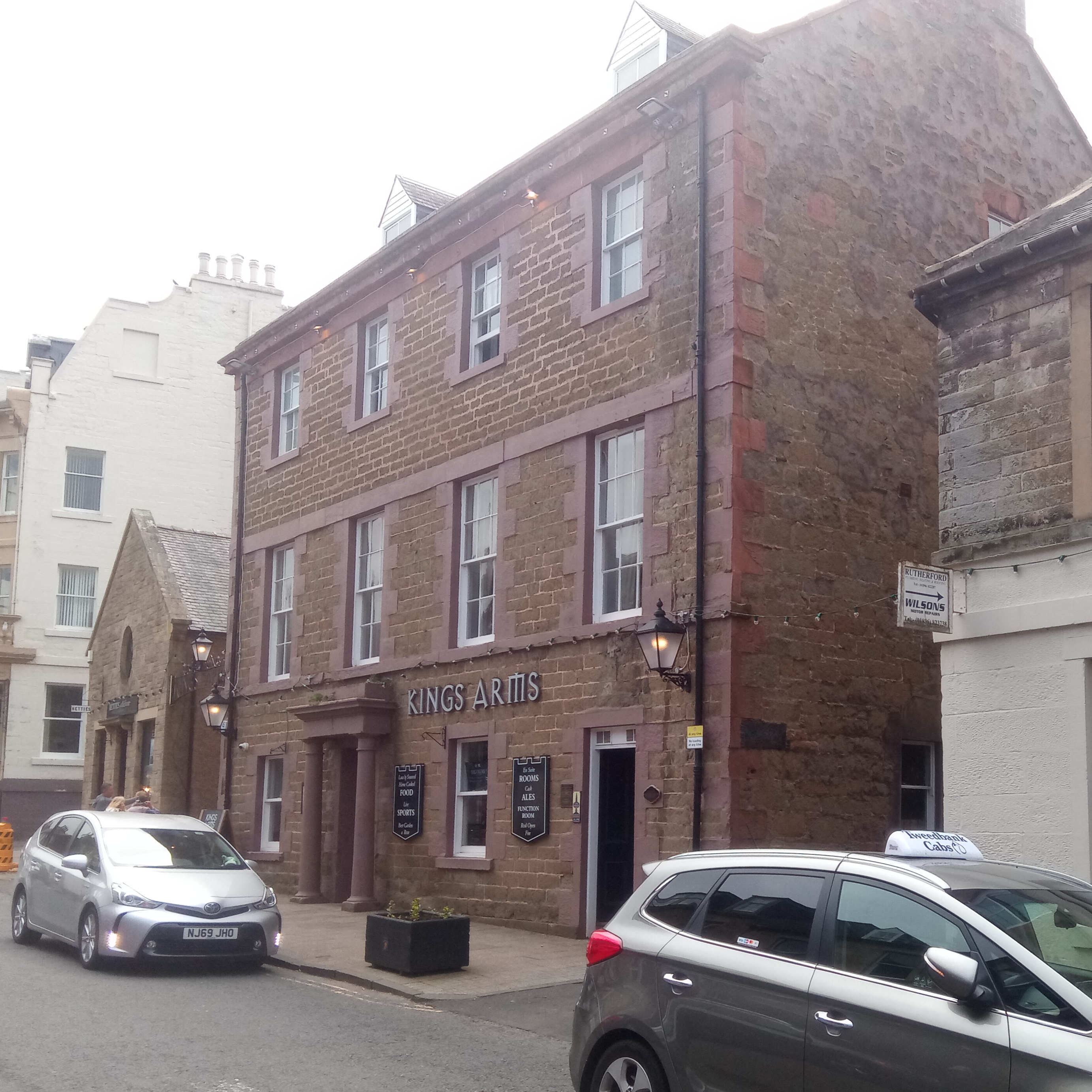
The Kings Arms Hotel in Melrose was owned by Johanna Kissling

In 1945, Johanna was smuggled out of Germany with the family fortune of around £2m, leaving the rest of his family to try and resurrect their brewing business. She came to live with her son in Scotland, they bought The Kings Arms Hotel in Melrose, Scottish Borders, that was owned by Johanna. Dr Kissling and Johanna had always been very close, but she was unhappy in Melrose. Dr Kissling was often away on research trips and the hotel lost money, leaving both living much less comfortably than they had in Germany. She is noted for her photographic work in Scotland and noted as making "many oversea trips in her life" in Michael Russell's book about her son, A Different Country: The Photographs of Werner Kissling. Johanna Kissling died in Melrose in 1961.

== Johanna Kissling's legacy ==
St Kilda, 1905, by Johanna Kissling

Johanna traveled as a tourist to St Kilda and Lewis in 1905. St Kilda inhabitants were regularly filmed and photographed by, often as a curiosity of the ‘primitive’ way of life. Johanna's photographs are considered alongside the approaches of Margaret Fay Shaw, Jenny Gilbertson and Alasdair Alpin Macgregor, who was one of the official photographers for The Times.

In November 2022, Johanna Kissler's work featured in the GLEAN exhibition at Edinburgh's City Art Centre of 14 early women photographers working in Scotland. The photographs and films that were curated by Jenny Brownrigg were by Helen Biggar, Violet Banks, Christina Broom, Mary Ethel Muir Donaldson, Dr Beatrice Garvie, Jenny Gilbertson, Isabel Frances Grant, Ruby Grierson, Marion Grierson, Isobel Wylie Hutchison, Isabell Burton-MacKenzie, Margaret Fay Shaw and Margaret Watkins

These women present different accounts of Scotland, covering both rural and city places and communities. Their work differs from their better-known male contemporaries, considers their different motivations and how these informed the work they made, and the different narratives we see emerging from their work in Scotland.

Johanna Kissling's photographs that now are held at Dumfries Museum Collection and City Art Centre in Edinburgh.

== Works ==
St Kilda series – 1905
