= Christina Broom =

Scottish photographer

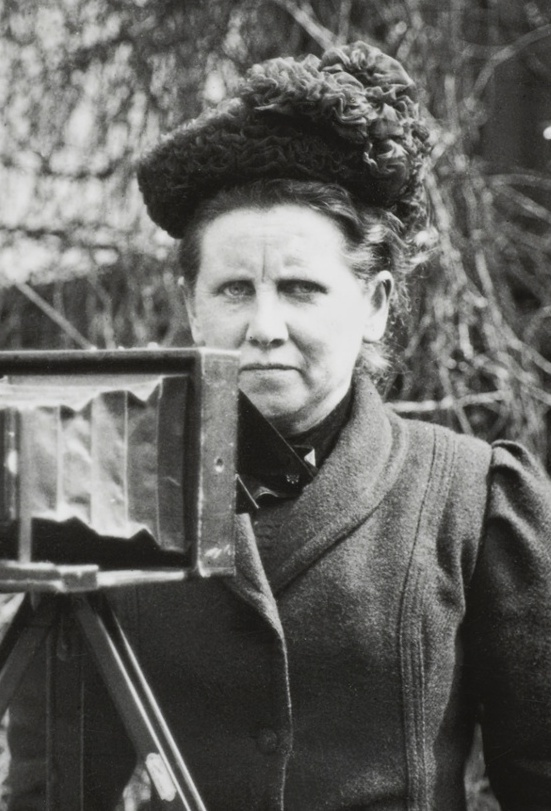
- Broom in 1910
- Born: Christina Livingston; 28 December 1862; Chelsea, London, England
- Died: 5 June 1939 (aged 76); Margate, Kent, England
- Occupation: Photographer
- Years active: 1904–1939
- Known for: UK's first female press photographer
- Movement: Photographer of suffragette movement in England
- Spouse: Albert Broom
- Children: Winifred Margaret Broom

Christina Broom (née Livingston; 28 December 1862 – 5 June 1939) was a Scottish photographer, credited as "the UK's first female press photographer".

== Early life ==
Christina Livingston was born on 28 December 1862 at 8 King's Road, Chelsea, London, the seventh of eight children of Scottish parents. Her father was Alexander Livingston (1812–1875), a master bootmaker and her mother Margaret Fair (1826–1884). She married Albert Edward Broom (1864–1912) in 1889. They had a daughter Winifred Margaret, born 7 August 1890 born at their home in Napier Avenue, Fulham. In 1903, following the failure of the family ironmongery business and other business ventures, perhaps as Albert had been injured in a cricket match, with damage to the bone in his shin in 1896, which did not heal, they opened a stationery shop in Streatham which also closed.

== Photography career ==
Needing a source of income, Broom borrowed a box camera and taught herself the basics of photography. She set up a stall in the Royal Mews at Buckingham Palace, selling postcards of photographs that she had taken. She maintained this stall from 1904 until 1930.

When the family moved to Burnfoot Avenue, she used the coal cellar as her dark room. She was assisted by Winifred, her daughter, who had left school to assist her; Albert wrote the captions for the postcards in his neat script. The postcards sold well: in one night-time session Broom printed 1,000.

Broom was appointed official photographer to the Household Division from 1904 to 1939 and had a darkroom in the Chelsea Barracks; she also took many photographs of local scenes, including those at the Palace, as well as The Boat Race and Suffragette marches. It is not known if she sympathised with the demand for women's suffrage, indeed it may be that Broom saw the historical importance of recording the events rather than taking part in them, but she took publicity pictures of Women's Sunday in 1908, and the mass march on 23 July 1910, when 10,000 women gathered, the Irish group dressed in green, and on 26 July 1913, women 'pilgrims' who had walked from Carlisle to London to support the moderate suffragists. Broom not only took pictures of suffragettes at events and marches but more informal shots throughout their campaign. She took images of the local Church pageant in Fulham in 1909 and the Army pageant in Fulham Palace grounds in 1910.

Albert died in 1912 and Christina and Winifred moved to Munster Road, Fulham. Broom took the professional name of Mrs Albert Broom. Christina and Winifred continued to photograph notable buildings, and people in informal and formal scenes, outdoors, a rare sight given the amount of equipment needed. Broom's health was affected by severe backpain and Winnie had to sometimes push her in a wheelchair to the Barracks to do her work.

In the 1920s and 1930s, her work was featured in publications such as the Daily Sketch, the Illustrated London News, The Tatler, The Sphere and Country Life. She took pictures of royal horses and of events and everyday life along with Army and official royal reportage.

Christina and Winifred were themselves photographed at the Mayor's reception, Fulham Town Hall in 1934, and at The Boat Race in 1936. Broom was last pictured relaxing, fishing in Margate shortly before her death.

== Death, legacy and commemoration ==
Broom died on 5 June 1939, she was buried in Fulham old cemetery.

Winifred was instrumental in safeguarding Broom's negatives by having them housed in public institutions. Queen Mary, a photographer herself, said they were 'for posterity where people may go and look at prints when they have more leisure.'

In 36 years of work Broom took 40,000 images altogether.

Collections of Broom's photographs are held at the Museum of London, the National Portrait Gallery, the Imperial War Museum, London, the National Museum of Scotland, Edinburgh, the National Maritime Museum, Greenwich, the Guards Museum, London; the Royal Borough of Kensington and Chelsea Local Studies Library; the Hammersmith and Fulham Archive and the National Army Museum; Maidstone Art Gallery, Kent; and the Harry Ransom Center and the Gernsheim Collection, University of Texas, both at Austin, Texas, United States.

Some of her work was on show in the National Portrait Gallery in 1994 as part of the exhibition Edwardian Women Photographers.

On 17 December 2009, a collection of some 2,000 of her photographs, mainly of military subjects, was to be offered for sale by auction at Sotheby's in London. It failed to sell and was acquired privately by the Museum of London. In June 2015, the museum opened an exhibition of her photographs entitled Soldiers and Suffragettes. Commentators noted the quality of the images printed from the original plates, as a testament to Christina Broom, a bold self-taught photographer's eye for an image.

The University of Birmingham referenced Broom's work within a 2017 retrospective on Käthe Buchler, a female German photographer, capturing life at home, during World War One in 2019. In November 2022 Donaldson's work featured in the GLEAN exhibition at Edinburgh's City Art Centre. The exhibition featured 14 early women photographers who had worked in Scotland. The photographs and films that were curated by Jenny Brownrigg were by Mary Ethel Muir Donaldson, Helen Biggar, Violet Banks, Beatrice Garvie, Jenny Gilbertson, Isabel Frances Grant, Ruby Grierson, Marion Grierson, Isobel Wylie Hutchison, Johanna Kissling, Isabell Burton-MacKenzie, Margaret Fay Shaw and Margaret Watkins.

Broom was one of a record number of women commemorated by English Heritage blue plaques in 2024, alongside others including Diana Beck, Irene Barclay and Adelaide Hall. Her blue plaque was unveiled on 8 August 2024 at 92 Munster Road, Fulham, London, SW6 5RD, her home from 1913 until her death in 1939.

== Media recognition ==
Broom was subject of the BBC Four documentary Britain in Focus: A Photographic History episode 2.

== Some photographs ==
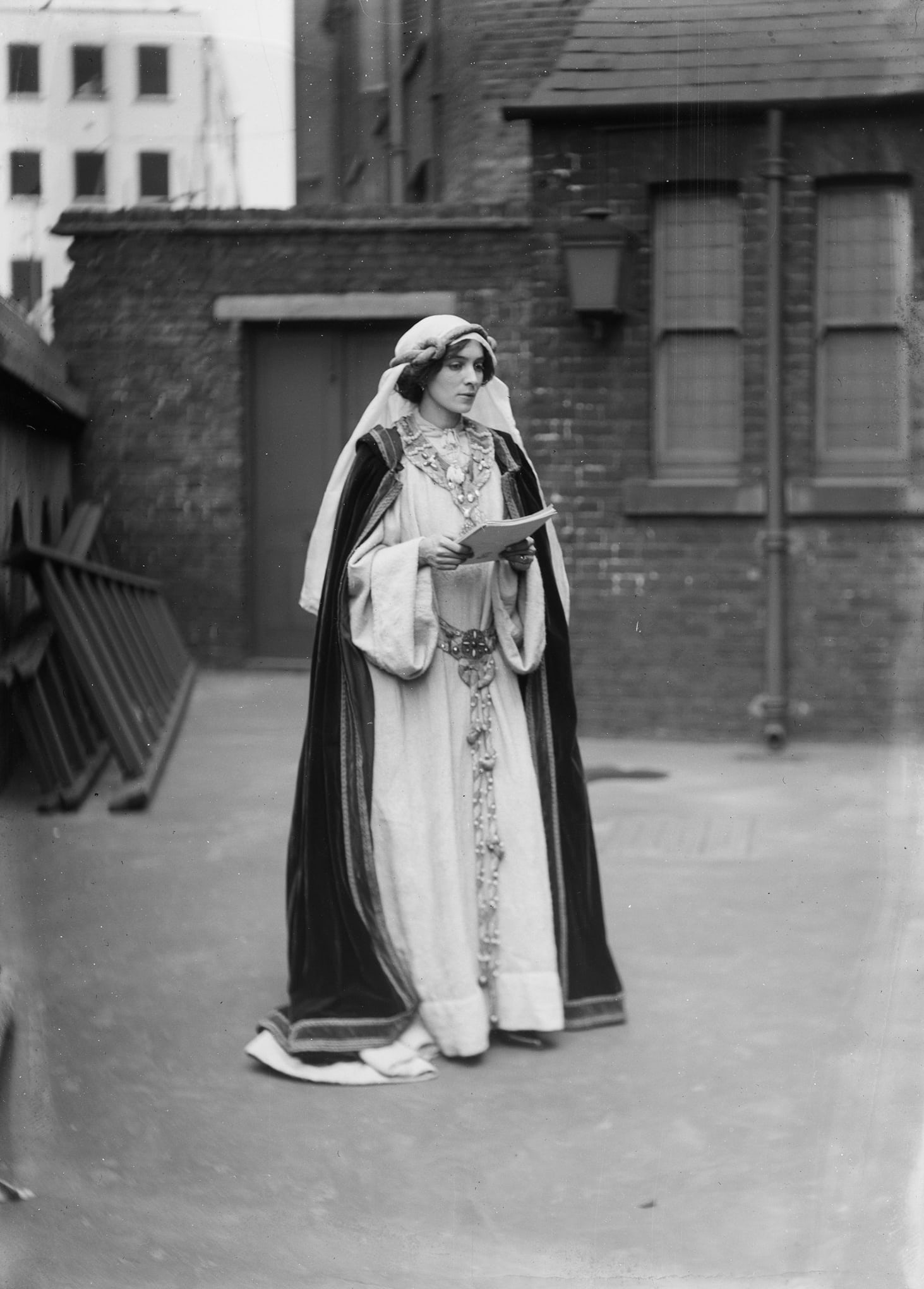
Suffragette in costume (1909)

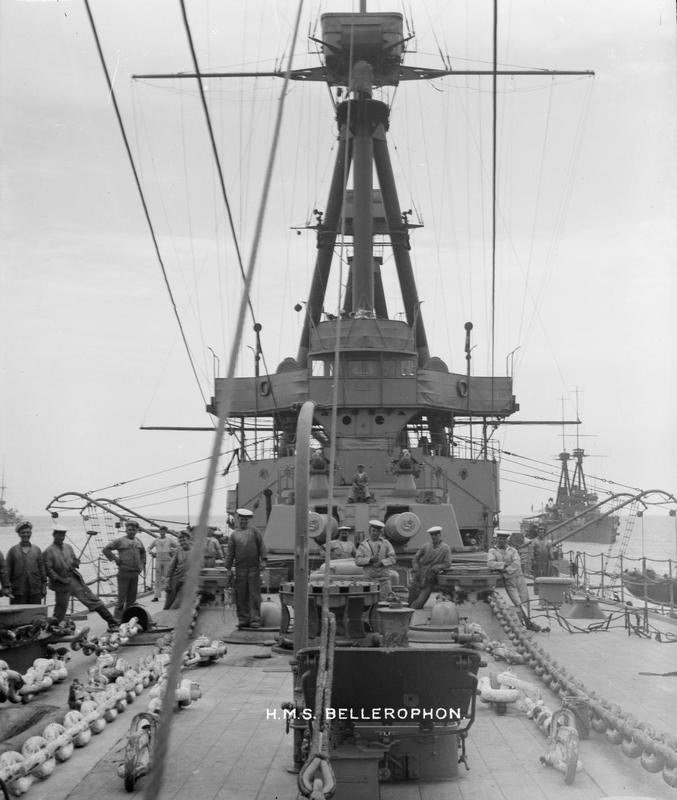
HMS Bellerophon

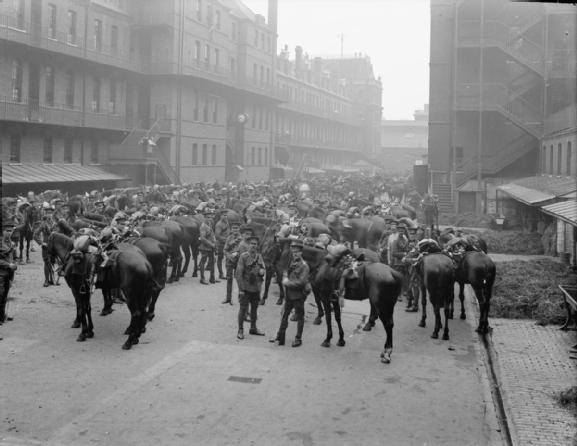
Life Guards (1914)

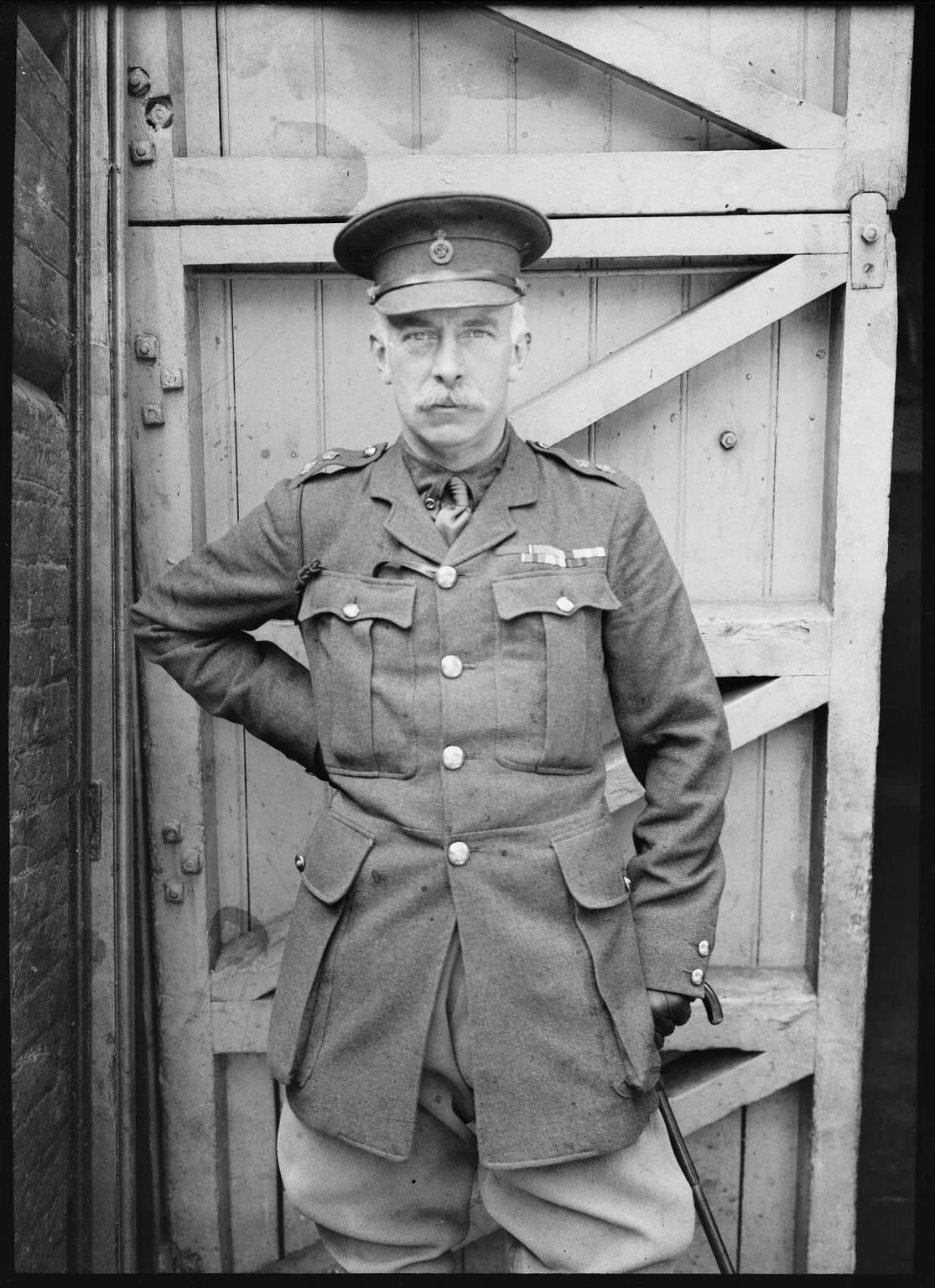
Adolphus Cambridge
