= Bigger on the inside (disambiguation) =

"Bigger on the inside" is a phrase often used to describe the fictional time machine and spacecraft TARDIS.

Bigger on the inside may also refer to:

- Bigger on the Inside, a 2013 mixtape by More or Les
- Bigger on the Inside: Christianity and Doctor Who, a 2015 book edited by Gregory Thornbury and Ned Bustard
- "Bigger on the Inside", a song by Aurelio Voltaire from 2012 album BiTrektual
- "Bigger on the Inside", a song by Amanda Palmer from 2019 album There Will Be No Intermission
- "Bigger on the Inside", a working title for the Doctor Who episode "The Doctor's Wife"

== See also ==
- Bag of holding
- Hammerspace
- Bigger (disambiguation)
- On the Inside (disambiguation)
