= Violet Banks =

Scottish artist (1896–1985)

- Born: 3 March 1896; Kinghorn, Fife, Scotland
- Died: 1985 (aged 88–89)
- Education: Edinburgh College of Art
- Occupation: Artist
- Known for: Painting, pottery

Violet Banks (3 March 1896 – 1985) was a Scottish artist who painted in oils and watercolours and also decorated pottery.

== Biography ==
Banks was born in Kinghorn in Fife and studied at the Edinburgh College of Art. She lived in Kirkcaldy for a time before returning to Edinburgh in 1928 to take the post of art mistress at St Ornan's School. She painted figure subjects and interiors in both oil and watercolour and was highly regarded as a pottery decorator. Banks was a regular exhibitor with the Royal Scottish Academy, the Royal Scottish Society of Painters in Watercolour, the Scottish Society of Women Artists and the Society of Scottish Artists. Examples of works by Banks are held in the national art collection of Scotland.

In November 2022, Banks' work was featured in the GLEAN exhibition at Edinburgh's City Art Centre of 14 early women photographers working in Scotland. The photographs and films that were curated by Jenny Brownrigg were by Helen Biggar, Banks, Christina Broom, M.E.M. Donaldson, Dr Beatrice Garvie, Jenny Gilbertson, Isabel Frances Grant, Ruby Grierson, Marion Grierson, Isobel Wylie Hutchison, Johanna Kissling, Isabell Burton-MacKenzie, Margaret Fay Shaw and Margaret Watkins.
