= Margaret Fay Shaw =

American folklorist

- Born: 9 November 1903; Glenshaw, Pennsylvania, U.S.
- Died: 11 December 2004 (aged 101); Fort William, Scotland
- Occupations: Photographer and folklorist
- Known for: Photographs and folklore collection in the Hebrides
- Spouse: John Lorne Campbell (m. 1935; died 1996)

Margaret Fay Shaw (9 November 1903 – 11 December 2004) was a pioneering Scottish-American ethnomusicologist, photographer, folklorist, and scholar of Celtic studies. She is best known for her meticulous work as a folk song and folklore collector among Scottish Gaelic-speakers in the Hebrides, Canadian Gaelic-speaking communities in Nova Scotia, and among Connaught Irish speakers in the Aran Islands. Along with her husband, literary scholar John Lorne Campbell, Shaw helped lay the foundation for both the modern Scottish Gaelic Renaissance and heritage language revival using Scottish Gaelic-medium education.

== Early life ==
The youngest of five sisters, Shaw was born in her family's "substantial mansion", built from homemade bricks in 1829, in Glenshaw, Pennsylvania.

The mansion stood on land where the Shaw family had lived since her great-great-grandfather, Scottish iron foundryman John Shaw, had emigrated to the United States with his four sons in 1782, and built there the first iron foundry west of the Allegheny Mountains. John Shaw later divided his land grant between his sons and permanently gave his surname to the surrounding district.

Margaret's great-grandfather, Thomas Wilson Shaw, Sr., lived to be ninety-six and often told the story in his old age of how his own father had lifted him up on his shoulders to see George Washington ride by on a white horse during a visit to Pittsburgh.

Shaw's paternal grandfather, Thomas Wilson Shaw, Jr., served as a surgeon in the Union Army during the Battle of Gettysburg and worked later as a slum doctor among immigrants working in the Pittsburgh steel refineries, even though the Shaw family's wealth was also largely drawn through canny investments in that same industry.

Henry Shaw, Shaw's father, was a Rensselaer Polytechnic Institute graduate and a civil engineer. He had privately longed to become an artist, but his dream had been prevented by his own father, who "regarded artists as Bohemians in velvet jackets and flowing ties, supported by their parents". Henry Shaw instead became an art collector with a hobby of making etchings. In later years, his "greatest delight was seeing the International Exhibition of paintings that came into the Carnegie Museum once a year."

Margaret's mother Fanny Maria Patchin was "a New England Yankee", whose Puritan ancestors had arrived in the Colony of Connecticut in 1640 and eventually migrated to Bennington, Vermont. Margaret later recalled her mother as a woman for whom "breeding and mental ability were what mattered" and who accordingly "found the wealth, without the distinguished minds, of the Pittsburghers difficult to take. But she had in my father a like mind in taste and in books."

In addition to raising her as a Presbyterian, Margaret's parents were reportedly very loving and attentive and, despite being forbidden at first to touch the instrument, Margaret developed a passionate interest in music from an early age when she learned to play the piano.

A major role in Margaret's childhood was also played by her parents' African-American servants, the Nash family, who often told her stories from their family's oral tradition, which stretched back to a slave plantation in Virginia and, before that, to Nigeria. The Irish folklore about the Celtic Otherworld shared during the extended visit of an Irish Traveller woman, whom Margaret knew only as "Irish Kate", fascinated her youthful imagination just as much.

After her parents died when she was 11, she moved to Scotland as a teenager and attended St Bride's all-girls' boarding school at Helensburgh, near Glasgow. Shaw later recalled that her French teacher at St. Bride's was a native of Aberdeenshire, "and was what would today be called a great Scottish nationalist". For this reason, the French teacher once ordered her students to make drawings to accompany the Declaration of Arbroath, which were hung on the walls until the horrified headmistress ordered them taken down.

The first performance of Gaelic song she heard was during a special concert at St. Bride's by the famous song collector Marjory Kennedy-Fraser, "who", according to Robert Perman, "had made a career of collecting Gaelic songs in the Hebrides and singing her own Anglicized versions of them."

Shaw later wrote about this life-altering concert, "As a child, I had learned Scots songs and a few of Robert Burns', but these she sang were completely new. To think they had been found in the Hebrides and I had never known anything about them! But there was something wrong, I felt; there was something more to these songs. If I could only go to those far-off islands and hear those singers myself!"

== Musicologist ==
While studying at New York University, she returned to Scotland in the 1920s and was overjoyed to hear once again the songs she had heard at St. Bride's, but sung in the original Gaelic by native speakers of the language.

After her plans to be a concert pianist were thwarted by rheumatism, Shaw switched, with the encouragement of Nadia Boulanger and Eileen Costello and much to her family's horror, from medicine to the new field of ethnomusicology and began full-time folk song collecting. She realized over time that the study of Classical music had not prepared her for collecting from traditional singers in Celtic languages, whose repertoire uses a completely different system of scales, tonalities, and modes.

She eventually came to South Uist, of which she later recalled, "Of all the islands I'd visited there was something about South Uist that just won me; it was like falling in love; it was the island that I wanted to go back to. Of course, I was not looking for islands: I was looking for a way to live my life."

While staying in Lochboisdale, she was entertained by the singing of two sisters, Màiri and Peigi MacRae. They told her that if she came to visit the former blackhouse at their remote croft, they would teach her all the songs they knew. Enthralled by their singing, she lived with them for the next six years and became a close friend. During this time, she recorded a great deal of information about the songs and stories they knew.

Shaw later recalled, "The words are the most important thing for the singers; the tune is just the carriage that carries the words. I learned that right away at Màiri MacRae's; not matter how cracked or awful the voice was in singing, the words had to be absolutely pure, so that everybody listening got the poetry. And I thought then how vastly important this is to singers to know that the words must be heard, that they should love the poetry."

Much of the information Shaw collected from the MacRae sisters was later published in her book Folksongs and Folklore of South Uist.

Shaw's photographs highlighted the working lives of women in South Uist, who played crucial roles in their families and local economies.

== Personal life ==
Shaw's photographic work attracted the attention of John Lorne Campbell. He came to South Uist to seek her help in the production of the book about Barra he was working on with Compton Mackenzie.

On a rainy evening in 1934, Campbell was introduced in typically Scottish style as "Young Inverneill" to Margaret Fay Shaw by the manager of the Lochboisdale Hotel on South Uist. Campbell later recalled, "As so often happens, we didn't take to each other at first, but we got to know each other and we were working in the same little world."

Their courtship was slow and awkward, but in March 1935, Shaw brought Campbell to meet her family in Glenshaw, Pennsylvania. She later recalled that he spent the whole visit chasing butterflies in the nearby forest or typing up books and articles in his room. The Shaw family accordingly decided that Campbell must not be seriously interested in Margaret, and no one was more shocked than she when Campbell proposed marriage on the last day of his visit.

In June 1935, Campbell and Shaw were married by Reverend Calum MacLeod in the manse of John Knox Presbyterian Church in Glasgow. Neither family attended, and the bride's family friend, Fred Moir, gave the bride away. At the groom's insistence, the ceremony was conducted in the Scottish Gaelic language and the bride was relieved to learn that she had only to say "Tha" ("Yes"). The Campbells spent their brief honeymoon in the Lofoten and Vesteraalen Islands of Norway before returning to Scotland.

== Language revivalist ==
In 1937, the Campbells traveled to Nova Scotia with an Ediphone to record Canadian Gaelic folklore and traditional singers. The Campbells spent six weeks in Cape Breton before moving on to Antigonish County, where they used the Ediphone to record upon wax cylinders 95 traditional Gaelic songs and ballads, two games, seven local songs, and three original songs sung by their composer. The Campbells also persuaded Jonathon G. MacKinnon, the former editor of the literary magazine Mac-Talla, to introduce him to Gabriel Syllibuy, the Chief of Cape Breton's indigenous Mi'kmaq people. The Campbells recorded Syllibuy as he described, in the Mikmaq language, an account from the oral tradition about the arrival of the first Gaels in the Province. The Campbells also recorded other Mikmaqs singing Catholic plainsong hymns in Mikmaq.

The Canadian Gaelic song recordings the Campbells made in Nova Scotia were later transcribed into musical notation with the assistance of Irish traditional musician and collector Séamus Ennis and published in the volume Songs Remembered in Exile: Traditional Gaelic Songs from Nova Scotia Recorded in Cape Breton and Antigonish County in 1937, with an Account of the Causes of the Highland Emigration, 1790–1835.

They lived in Barra until the Campbells went into long-term debt to purchase the Hebridean island of Canna in 1938.

After having to take over the running of the Canna estate during her husband's brief mental breakdown and institutionalization, Shaw followed her husband into the Catholic Church in Scotland a few years after his own conversion in 1946. But she always insisted that her favorite English-language Presbyterian hymns from her childhood, such as Charles Wesley's Christ the Lord is Risen Today, be sung during Low Mass at St Columba's R.C. Church upon Canna, to the incomprehension of the island's Gaelic-speaking population.

In 1949, Shaw had a lengthy face-to-face meeting inside Boosey and Hawes Music Shop in London and played several of her field recordings for visiting Hungarian composer Zoltan Kodaly.

After years of taking care of her husband during multiple mental health struggles, Shaw was finally able to find enough time to complete her life's work: Folksongs And Folklore Of South Uist, which was published by Routledge & Kegan Paul in 1955. Ray Perman has described the resulting volume, upon whose strength Shaw "was awarded four honorary degrees", by the Universities of Edinburgh, Aberdeen, St Francis Xavier, and the National University of Ireland, as "a selection of the songs she had taken down, including songs in praise of South Uist, love songs, lullabies, laments, songs of exile, songs as accompaniment to dancing or working, such as milking songs, spinning songs and waulking songs. She also included stories and anecdotes, prayers, proverbs, herbal medicines, charms and recipes."

Two-thirds of the contributors to Shaw's book were women. One of the most prominent figures in the book is St Brigid of Kildare, about whom many local stories, songs, and customs are recorded.

In a 2004 article about Shaw for The Guardian, Brian Wilson wrote of the book, "Not only was it a scholarly presentation of the songs and lore which she had written down during her sojourn on the island, but also an invaluable description of life in a small crofting community during the 1930s."

Shaw was most pleased by the response her book received from the many South Uist traditional singers and tradition bearers from whom its contents had been collected. Her book was "accepted... as a warm and authentic tribute to their culture and way of life."

Even more importantly, the MacRae sisters wept for joy as they read through their copy of Shaw's book. Shaw further recalled saying in a conversation with tradition-bearer Màiri Anndra, "I'd be terribly upset if indeed I had hurt anybody's feelings", only for Màiri Anndra to reply, "There's not a wrong word in the four corners of that book!"

In advance of St Columba's Day, 9 June 1963, Shaw learned that Bishop Stephen McGill of the Catholic Diocese of Argyll and the Isles, a Glaswegian who preferred Anglo-Saxon princess and Queen St Margaret of Scotland as a national saint, had refused to celebrate the 1,400th anniversary of St. Columba's arrival from Gaelic Ireland as a Christian missionary to Scotland. Deciding to defy the Bishop with a discreet celebration of their own, Shaw and the parish priest of St. Columba's Catholic Church upon Canna arranged for a Tridentine Solemn High Mass followed by Eucharistic Benediction for the enormous number of pilgrims who arrived aboard boats from Rùm, Eigg, and Mallaig.

Following the Second Vatican Council, Campbell and Shaw disliked the abandonment of the Ecclesiastical Latin liturgical language and the subsequent introduction of the Mass of Paul VI in the vernacular. They accordingly joined the Scottish Branch of Una Voce, which still presses for the greater availability of the Tridentine Mass, immediately upon its foundation in 1965.

The Campbells' three-volume collection of Hebridean folk songs, published between 1969 and 1981, is regarded as a valuable source. Their personal archive at Canna House is an even more invaluable resource for scholars of Scottish Gaelic literature, Scottish traditional musicians, and folklorists.

The Campbells donated their house and its contents to the National Trust for Scotland in 1981, but Shaw continued to live there even after her husband's death while they were on holiday at Villa San Girolamo in Fiesole in Italy in 1996.

== Death ==
Margaret Fay Shaw died in Fort William in 2004 at the age of 101. It was announced in The Guardian that, in accordance with her wishes, she would be buried in South Uist. As Campbell had stipulated in his Will, money was left to the Diocese of Argyll and the Isles for the Tridentine Requiem Mass to be offered annually for the souls of Campbell and Shaw. The request continues to be honored annually by Una Voce Scotland.

The tribute to her work that meant to most by far to Shaw was made, in response to both the 1955 publication of Folksongs and Folklore of South Uist and Shaw's role in helping to inspire a Scottish Gaelic language revival, as part of a Gaelic poem in praise of (Scottish Gaelic: Maighread chòir, Bean uasal Eilean Chanaidh) ("Honest Margaret, the noble Lady of the Isle of Canna") by South Uist Bard Fred T. Mac 'ill Iosa (Fred Gillies):

An éibhleag anns an gann bha 'n deò
Shéid i oirre, 's thug i bheò a rithist.
An ember was dying; she blew on it
And brought it to life again.

== Legacy ==
In 2007, scholars gathered in a conference in her honor in South Uist called "Gleann na Ceolraidh" ("Glen of the Muses"). As part of this event, a CD featuring recordings of folk songs Shaw collected was released. It was recorded by two of her close friends, Paul McCallum and Vivien Mackie. In 2019, Shaw was commemorated in the film Solas, produced by the Canna House Archivist Fiona J Mackenzie, which made use of previously unseen footage Shaw shot in the Hebrides. Many of the early sound recordings she made are available online on the platform Tobar an Dualchais.

In November 2022, Shaw's work was featured in the GLEAN exhibition at Edinburgh's City Art Centre, alongside the work of 14 early women photographers who worked in Scotland. The photographs and films that Jenny Brownrigg curated were by Shaw, Helen Biggar, Violet Banks, Christina Broom, M.E.M. Donaldson, Beatrice Garvie, Jenny Gilbertson, Isabel Frances Grant, Ruby Grierson, Marion Grierson, Isobel Wylie Hutchison, Johanna Kissling, Isabell Burton-MacKenzie, and Margaret Watkins

== Bibliography ==
- Folksongs and Folklore of South Uist (1955)
- From the Alleghenies to the Hebrides: An Autobiography (1993)
- Eilean: The Photography of Margaret Fay Shaw (2018)

== See also ==
- John Lorne Campbell
- Marjory Kennedy-Fraser
