= Biggart =

Biggart is a surname. Notable people with the surname include:

- Bill Biggart (1947–2001), American photojournalist
- James Biggart (1878–1932), Tobagonian pharmacist
- Mabelle Biggart (1861–?), American educator, preacher, and writer
- Nicole W. Biggart, American academic

== See also ==
- Biggar (surname)
