= Helen Biggar =

Scottish sculptor, film-maker, theatre designer, and political activist

Helen Manson Biggar
- Helen Biggar died 1953
- Born: 25 May 1909; Glasgow, Scotland
- Died: 28 March 1953 (aged 43); London, England
- Other name: Helen Montlake (married name)
- Education: Glasgow School of Art
- Occupations: Sculptor, theatre designer, political activist, film maker
- Spouse: Eli Montlake (m. 1948)

Helen Biggar (25 May 1909 – 28 March 1953) was a Scottish sculptor, filmmaker and theatre designer. She was politically active in the 1930s, she joined the Communist Party of Great Britain and was one of the filmmakers behind Hell Unltd, recognised as one of Britain's most important pieces of avant-garde political film.

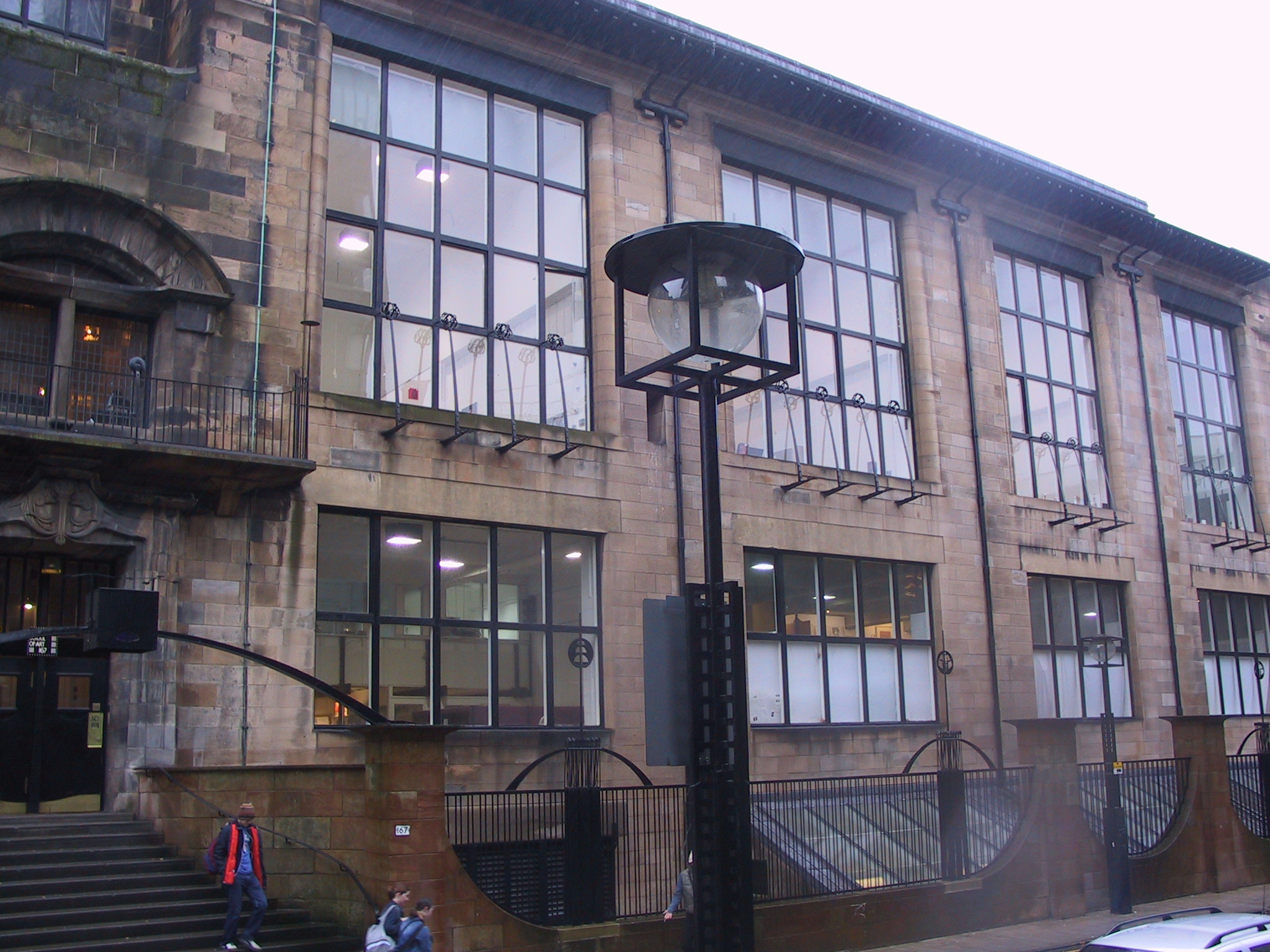
Glasgow School of Art, where Biggar studied.

== Life and education ==
Biggar was born in Glasgow, Scotland in 1909, the eldest daughter of Florence and Hugh Biggar, a founding member of the Independent Labour Party. She was the niece of John Biggar, Lord Provost of Glasgow between 1941 and 1943. As a child she fell victim to a number of accidents including two injuries to her spine, which affected her height.

Biggar enrolled at the Glasgow School of Art in 1925, at the age of 16, to study textile design, and graduated in 1929. She then went on to study sculpture at postgraduate level. Following her graduation, she set up a studio in the city.

In 1945, Biggar moved to London, marrying Eli Montlake in 1948. She died at St Mary Abbots Hospital, Paddington in London, having suffered a sudden brain haemorrhage.

== Artistic work ==
=== Sculpture ===
Biggar's sculptural work was undertaken in a variety of media including plaster, clay and stone. One focus of her work was portraiture, one of her subjects being Emilio Coia, a fellow student at Glasgow School of Art. Another subject was her sister Mary, and also her uncle John Biggar, the result of which was exhibited in 1935 at the Royal Glasgow Institute.

=== Film ===
After leaving the Glasgow School of Art, Biggar met Norman McLaren, with whom she shared political views. In 1935 they collaborated on Camera Makes Whoopee, an animated film. They then collaborated again in 1936 on Hell Unltd, a non-narrative protest film attacking government spending on munitions as opposed to healthcare and welfare provision. It was created though a collage by mixing animated sections, library footage and live-action. Hell Unltd was bought and distributed by Kino Films. The film was a collaboration with Norman McLaren with notes flying between the two showing their synergy.

In March 1938, Biggar made a documentary concerning Glasgow's May Day Procession, entitled May Day 1938 or Challenge to Fascism. The film was shot with three 16mm static cameras, operated by Biggar, her old tutor from Glasgow School of Art Willie Maclean and G. Bartlett of the Glasgow Kino Group. Biggar placed an advert in the Scottish Co-operative newspaper seeking assistance to raise £50 to make it.

=== Theatre ===
Biggar joined the Glasgow Workers' Theatre Group in 1938, becoming their stage designer. After its founding in 1940, she designed for the Glasgow Unity Theatre, and in 1950, joined Ballet Rambert as a costume designer and wardrobe mistress.

== Legacy ==
Anna Shepherd, Biggar's niece, wrote two accounts of her life. The first, unpublished, work, Traces Left, served as the source material for a documentary made by the Birmingham Film Workshop in 1983. In 2014 Shepherd published Helen Unlimited: A Little Biggar.

In November 2022 Biggar's work featured in the GLEAN exhibition at Edinburgh's City Art Centre of 14 early women photographers working in Scotland. The photographs and films that were curated by Jenny Brownrigg were by Biggar, Violet Banks, Christina Broom, M.E.M. Donaldson, Dr Beatrice Garvie, Jenny Gilbertson, Isabel Frances Grant, Ruby Grierson, Marion Grierson, Isobel Wylie Hutchison, Johanna Kissling, Isabell Burton-MacKenzie, Margaret Fay Shaw and Margaret Watkins
