= Isabel Frances Grant =

Scottish ethnographer, historian and collector

Isabel Frances Grant MBE (1887–1983) was a Scottish ethnographer, historian, collector and pioneering founder of the Highland Folk Museum.

== Early life and development ==
Known familiarly from childhood as 'Elsie', Grant was born in Edinburgh on 21 July 1887, but grew up with a strong sense of belonging to the Scottish Highlands and especially the area around Badenoch and Strathspey, with its ancient links to the Clan Grant. A family member of the Grants of Tullochgorm, and daughter of a colonel in the Seaforth Highlanders, she was sent to London and the care of her grandfather Field Marshal Sir Patrick Grant, Goldstick-in-Waiting to Queen Victoria, and his daughter Miss Frances Gough Grant – known as 'Aunt Fan' – when her parents were posted to India. It was Aunt Fan who accompanied Elsie on early visits to museums and art galleries in London, inspiring a life-long interest in material culture and collecting. Later visits to folk museums in Scandinavia encouraged Elsie to dream of a museum for the Highlands and Islands that would preserve and promote a better appreciation of the rapidly disappearing material cultures and Gaelic traditions of northern and western Scotland.

== Writing and publications ==
Grant's writing career was encouraged by the economist John Maynard Keynes, for whom she worked as a researcher. Keynes published a number of articles by Grant in The Economic Review from 1912 onwards – with two appearing under her own name in 1926 and 1928. A Keynesian approach to social and economic history is evident in her first book, Every-Day Life on an Old Highland Farm, 1769–82, published in 1924. Books such as The Social and Economic Development of Scotland before 1603 (1930) and The Lordship of the Isles (1935) established Grant as a respected voice in the fields of ethnography and social and family history in Scotland and an important contributor to the cultural renewal and optimistic sense of national identity that was reawakened in her country as the modern Scottish Renaissance grew and developed during the 1930s and the decades after the Second World War. Her work was key in helping to establish the Scottish Highlands as a serious subject for modern scholarship. Other publications included: Everyday Life in Old Scotland (1931); In the Tracks of Montrose (1931); The Economic History of Scotland (1930); The Clan Grant: the Development of a Clan (1955); The MacLeods: the History of a Clan, 1200–1956 (1959); the magisterial and hugely influential Highland Folk Ways (1961); The Clan MacLeod: with their Rock-built Fortress they have Endured (1966); Angus Og of the Isles (1969).

=== Reviews ===
- Alexander, John (1975), review of Highland Folk Ways, in Burnett, Ray (ed.), Calgacus 2, Summer 1995, p. 57, ISSN 0307-2029

== Highland Folk Museum ==
In 1930 Grant organised and curated the 'Highland Exhibition' staged in Inverness, with some 2,100 artefacts gathered and exhibited as a 'national folk museum'. She founded the Highland Folk Museum in 1935, using a personal legacy to acquire a disused former United Free Church on the island of Iona. Nicknamed Am Fasgadh (Gaelic for 'The Shelter'), the Highland Folk Museum's remit was "...to shelter homely ancient Highland things from destruction", and Grant collected assiduously to that end; by 1938 the collection had outgrown its home. In 1939 the museum moved to larger premises on the mainland at Laggan, Badenoch: a village in the central Highlands, where Am Fasgadh was sited for the next five years. The outbreak of the Second World War, and resultant restrictions on movement along the west coast and islands of Scotland, meant that Grant was unable to collect during this period, while petrol shortages contributed to a general reduction in the numbers of visitors to the museum. In 1943 she purchased Pitmain Lodge, a large Georgian house, together with three acres of land near to the train station at Kingussie, about twelve miles east of Laggan, and on 1 June 1944 the Highland Folk Museum opened once again to the public.

In 1939, Grant wrote in Scottish Home and Country, the magazine of the Scottish Women's Rural Institute.

I began to long for a Folk Museum for the Highlands more than fifteen years ago. I happened to go on a cruise to Scandinavia, and, like most visitors to Norway, Denmark and Sweden, was delighted with the Folk Museums - the museums devoted to the homely, everyday life of the people of these countries. One saw fine examples of the old country crafts - weaving, embroidery, woodwork and the like - the implements, furniture the people had made and used. One saw rooms, house, even villages re-erected and completely replenished, exactly as they had been when they were the homes of bygone country folk."

The collections at Kingussie were developed "...to show different aspects of the material setting of life in the Highlands in byegone days" and included vast arrays of objects: furniture, tools, farming implements, horse tackle, cooking and dining utensils and vessels, pottery, glass, musical instruments, sporting equipment, weapons, clothing and textiles, jewellery, books, photographs and archive papers with accounts of superstitions, stories and songs, and home-crafted items of every shape and description, including basketry, Barvas ware and treen. The site at Kingussie also enabled Grant to develop a suite of replica buildings: including an Inverness-shire cottage, a Lewis blackhouse and a Highland but-and-ben. These buildings and the use of 'live demonstrations' to interpret exhibits for visitors sealed the Highland Folk Museum's popular reputation as the first open-air museum on mainland Britain.

When Grant retired in 1954 ownership of the Highland Folk Museum and its collections was taken over by a Trust formed by the four ancient Scottish universities (Aberdeen, Edinburgh, Glasgow and St. Andrews). George 'Taffy' Davidson, senior fellow in arts and crafts at the University of Aberdeen, was appointed curator in 1956 and developed the collections in parallel with his own antiquarian interests, including folk music, taking in large numbers of gifts over the coming years. The next phase of the Highland Folk Museum's history began in 1975, when Highland Regional Council took over its running. Ross Noble of the Scottish Country Life Museums Trust was appointed curator and a process of modernisation began. Noble introduced open, thematic displays and re-introduced live demonstrations as part of popular 'Heritage in Action' days for visitors. The museum thrived. In the early 1980s an eighty-acre site was acquired at Newtonmore – about three miles to the south of Kingussie – and work began to lay out four distinct areas: Aultlarie Croft – a 1930s working farm; Balameanach (Gaelic for 'Middle Village') – a developing community of relocated buildings; the Pinewoods – an area of forest with interlinking paths; and Baile Gean – the Highland Folk Museum's reconstruction of an early 1700s Highland township. The Newtonmore site opened to the public in 1987 and operated in tandem with Am Fasgadh until the closure of that site in Kingussie in 2007. In 2011 responsibility for the day-to-day running of the Highland Folk Museum and its collections was handed over to High Life Highland – an arm's-length charity formed by the Highland Council to develop culture, health and wellbeing, learning, leisure and sports across the region. The new Am Fasgadh – a modern, purpose-built collections storage facility and conference venue – opened in 2014, and in 2015 the collections at the Highland Folk Museum received official 'Recognition' from Museums Galleries Scotland and the Scottish Government as a 'Nationally Significant Collection'.

== Honours ==
The University of Edinburgh awarded Grant with an honorary doctorate (LL.D) in 1948 for the creation of the Highland Folk Museum. In 1959, in recognition of her contributions to scholarship, she was made a Member of the Most Excellent Order of the British Empire (MBE).

== Death and legacy ==
Grant continued to publish late into life, and her home on Heriot Row in the New Town of Edinburgh was a popular meeting place for the capital's academics and young scholars. She died in Edinburgh on 19 September 1983, and is buried at Dalarossie in Strathdearn.

In November 2022 Grants' work featured in the GLEAN exhibition at Edinburgh's City Art Centre of 14 early women photographers working in Scotland. The photographs and films, that were curated by Jenny Brownrigg, included Grant, Helen Biggar, Violet Banks, Christina Broom, M.E.M. Donaldson, Ruby Grierson, Marion Grierson, Isobel Wylie Hutchison, Johanna Kissling, Margaret Fay Shaw and Margaret Watkins
