= Biggar =

Biggar may refer to:

== Geography ==
=== Canada ===
- Biggar, Saskatchewan, Canada, a town
- Rural Municipality of Biggar No. 347, Saskatchewan, Canada
- Biggar Lake, Algonquin Provincial Park, Ontario
- Biggar (electoral district), a provincial electoral district since 2002
- Biggar (former provincial electoral district), a provincial electoral district from 1912 to 1995

=== United Kingdom ===
- Biggar, Cumbria, England, a village
- Biggar, South Lanarkshire, Scotland, a town and former burgh
- Biggar Water, a minor river in Scotland and tributary of the River Tweed

== People ==
- Biggar (surname)
- Biggar family, Alexander Harvey Biggar (1781–1838) and his sons Robert and George, pioneer traders at Port Natal
- Baldwin of Biggar, 12th century Scots magnate

== Transportation ==
- Biggar Airport, Saskatchewan, Canada
- Biggar station, a heritage railway station operated by Via Rail in Saskatchewan, Canada
- Biggar (Scotland) railway station, a former station on the Symington, Biggar and Broughton Railway

== Other uses ==
- Biggar Museum Trust
- Biggar RFC, a rugby club in Scotland

== See also ==
- Rosetown—Biggar (federal electoral district), federal electoral district from 1935 to 1968
- Rosetown–Biggar (provincial electoral district), a former provincial electoral district
- Saskatoon—Biggar, federal electoral district from 1968 to 1978
- Saskatoon—Rosetown—Biggar, federal electoral district since 1997
- Bigga (disambiguation)
- Bigger (disambiguation)
