= Bigga =

Bigga can refer to the following:

== Places ==
- Bigga, New South Wales, a village in Australia
- Bigga, Shetland, an island in Scotland

== Organisations ==
- B.I.G.G.A., British and International Golf Greenkeepers Association
- Bigga, a Jamaican cream soda

== See also ==
- Biggar (disambiguation)
