= Glenshaw, Pennsylvania =

Unincorporated community in Pennsylvania, US

- Census-designated place
- Location in Allegheny County and state of Pennsylvania
- Coordinates: 40°32′21″N 79°58′25″W
- Country: United States
- State: Pennsylvania
- County: Allegheny
- Townships: Ross, Shaler

Area
  - Total: 3.12 sq mi (8.09 km^{2})
  - Land: 3.12 sq mi (8.09 km^{2})
  - Water: 0 sq mi (0.00 km^{2})

Population (2020)
  - Total: 8,945
  - Density: 2,862.3/sq mi (1,105.13/km^{2})
- Time zone: UTC-5 (Eastern (EST))
  - Summer (DST): UTC-4 (EDT)
- ZIP codes: 15116
- FIPS code: 42-29800

Glenshaw is a census-designated place within Shaler, Hampton, Indiana, O'Hara and Ross townships in Allegheny County, Pennsylvania, United States. As of the 2020 census, it had a population of 8,945.

== Demographics ==
Historical population
Census	Pop.	Note	%±
2010	8,981		—
2020	8,945		−0.4%
U.S. Decennial Census

== Notable people ==
- Margaret Fay Shaw (1903 – 2004), ethnomusicologist, photographer, and folklorist.
