= Alexander Biggar =

Alexander Biggar may refer to:

- Alexander Biggar (1781–1838) of the Biggar family, prominent South African colonists
- Alexander Biggar (footballer), Scottish professional footballer
