= Dumfries Museum =

Dumfries Museum and Camera Obscura
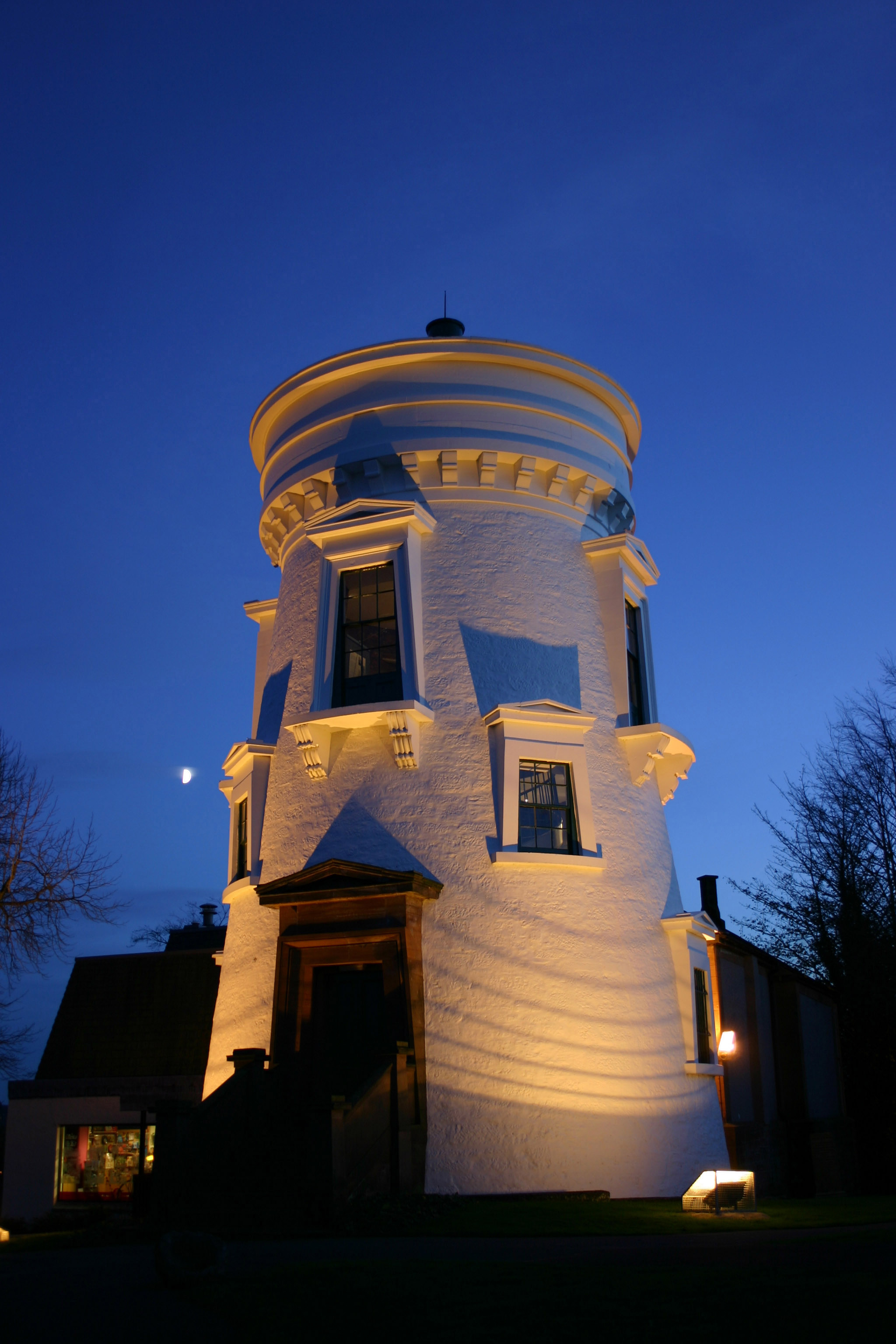
- Exterior view of the Camera Obscura
- Interactive map of the Dumfries Museum and Camera Obscura area

General information
- Architectural style: Victorian and modern
- Location: Dumfries, Scotland
- Coordinates: 55.0652°N 3.6146°W
- Renovated: 2011

Dumfries Museum and Camera Obscura, located in Dumfries in Dumfries & Galloway, is the largest museum in the region. The museum has extensive collections relating to local and history from the pre-historic era. The museum also has the world's oldest working camera obscura. Admission is free, though a small fee applies for the camera obscura.

== Collections ==
The museum's collections cover all material relating to the natural history and human pre-history of the region, from geology to dress, folk material, archaeology and early photographs.

Notable artefacts include:

- A cast of the skull of Robert the Bruce as well as femur and foot bones.
- A Bronze Age cist burial including the remains of a 35-year-old man from the beaker people.
- A large collection of Roman and Celtic stone crosses and funerary monuments.
- A replica of the first bicycle, as designed by Kirkpatrick Macmillan.
- The photographic archive of Dr Werner Kissling.
- Personal items belonging to Thomas Carlyle
- Fossil reptile tracks from the local Permian sandstone including Corncockle Quarry.

== History ==
Originally built as a four-storey windmill on Corbelly hill, the highest point in Maxwelltown, in 1798, the site was purchased by Dumfries and Maxwellton Astronomical Society in 1834. Over a two-year period the tower was converted into an Observatory, and with advice from polar explorer Sir John Ross, a telescope was purchased from a Mr Morton of Kilmarnock. With its completion in 1836, unfortunately the observatory missed the arrival of Halley's Comet; however, it was used in this role until 1872.

The main hall of the museum was built in 1862, and housed the collections of the newly founded Dumfries and Galloway Natural History & Antiquarian Society. In 1981 a major addition of a new gallery, shop, search room and offices for curatorial staff was added. In 2011 the exterior of the windmill tower was refurbished.

== Camera Obscura ==
The camera obscura is currently the oldest working example in the world, and has been in continuous operation since 1836. The instrument, based in the top level of the windmill tower, offers a complete 360° panorama of the surrounding landscape. The image is projected onto a focusing table below, and operated using a simple rope mechanism. In order to protect the instrument it is only operated during the summer months and on days when weather conditions are clear. The museums photographic expert for thirty years was Werner Kissling who donated his photos to the museum when he died.
