= Bigger =

Bigger may refer to:

== People ==
- John Bigger (died 1840), Ohio legislator and father of Samuel
- Samuel Bigger (1802–1846), Governor of Indiana
- Edward Coey Bigger (1861–1942), Irish politician and physician
- Francis Joseph Bigger (1863–1926), Irish antiquarian
- Joseph Warwick Bigger (1891–1951), Irish politician and academic
- Brian Bigger (born 1958), Canadian politician

== Music ==
- "Bigger" (Backstreet Boys song), 2009
- "Bigger" (Justin Bieber song), 2009
- "Bigger" (Beyoncé song), 2019
- "Bigger" (Stan Walker song), 2020
- Bigger (album), a 2018 album by Sugarland

== Other uses ==
- "Bigger", episode 2 of the eighth season of Alvin and the Chipmunks (1983)
- Bigger (film), a 2018 film about bodybuilders Joe Weider and Ben Weider
- Bigger (TV series), an American comedy series streaming on BET+
- Bigger Township, Jennings County, Indiana, United States

== See also ==
- Biggar (disambiguation)
- Bigga (disambiguation)
