= Capital Collections =

Image collection of Edinburgh Libraries

- Website type: image library
- Available in: English
- Owner: Edinburgh Libraries
- Website: Capital Collections
- Launched: February 2008
- Current status: Active

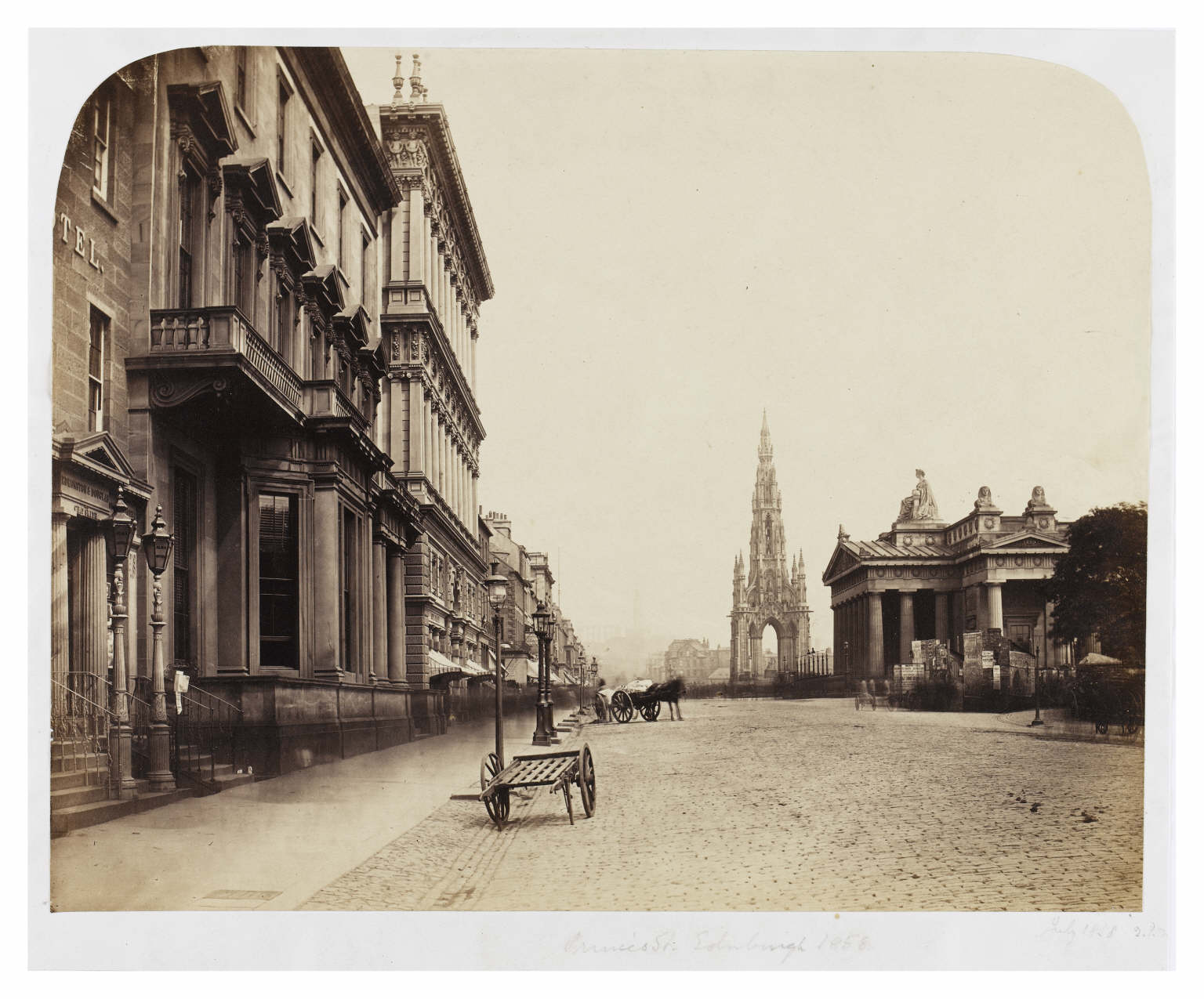
A photograph taken in 1858 by William Donaldson Clark showing Princes Street in Edinburgh, from Capital Collections online image library

Capital Collections is Edinburgh Libraries' online image library. The project was initiated to provide greater access to some of the 100,000 images within its collections. The website was launched in February 2008 with an accompanying exhibition, entitled “Edinburgh Past and Present”, featuring images chosen by personalities connected with the city. Some of the celebrities who selected and commented on images from the collection included swimmer Kirsty Balfour, impressionist Rory Bremner, former Bishop of Edinburgh Richard Holloway, and children’s author Aileen Paterson. Six years later, nearly 35,000 images have been digitised and more than 8000 images are available to view online.

== World Heritage Site ==
The digitisation project was part-funded by Edinburgh World Heritage Trust, to allow users access to the rare and unique material relating to the Old and New Towns of the UNESCO World Heritage Site. The website gives people all over the globe an educational tool to learn more about their family history and cultural roots.

The photographer involved with the project have the opportunity to take contemporary photographs of the city. The modern images compliment and provide comparisons with the early photographs of Edinburgh, as well as providing a valuable record of the changes occurring in the city.

== Collections ==
The Special Collections within the departments of Central Library contain materials representing Edinburgh and Scotland’s social, cultural and architectural heritage. They contain items of international importance in a variety of media, including paintings, Japanese prints, engravings and drawings. Capital Collections displays a particularly strong collection of early photography, most notably including work by the founding fathers of modern photography Hill & Adamson as well as lesser known pioneers, Archibald Burns, Thomas Keith and Thomas Begbie. Other artists of note include Walter Geikie, John Kay, Alexander Nasmyth and James Skene.

== New Developments ==
Capital Collections is also represented on Flickr giving further digital access to otherwise hard to reach resources. By adopting this alternative approach to digital media, the project is attempting to engage with new online audiences through the principles of photo sharing and user-generated content.
