= Rose Frain =

Scottish visual artist

- Born: Sunderland, County Durham
- Known for: Painting, sculpture, installation art

Rose Frain was a visual artist based in Edinburgh, Scotland, exhibiting nationally and internationally, whose works range from painting and sculpture to installation. She died January 2026.

Frain studied at Durham University, the Department of Fine Art, Newcastle upon Tyne, (now Newcastle University) where she was taught by Victor Pasmore, Richard Hamilton, Louisa Hodgson and art historian Ralph Holland; the University of Edinburgh and the University of Leeds.

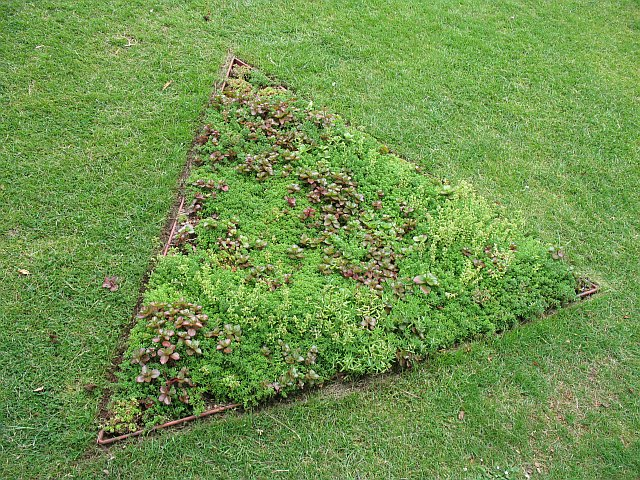
"2020/Green Arrow", a sculpture by Frain in the Royal Botanic Garden Edinburgh. The title refers to a deadline to reduce European carbon emissions.

She was the Scottish Arts Council resident artist at The British School at Rome between 1999 and 2000, where she created the installation Radio Vaticana, citing electromagnetic radiation from the Vatican's radio transmitters. In 2007 she received a major Scottish Arts Council Visual Artists' Award.

For the Edinburgh Art Festival 2009, she produced Alexandria Light -an installation informed by her residency during November 2008 at the Bibliotheca Alexandrina in Egypt. Frain's One of a Kind Artist Book Sappho Fragments, Love songs to Adonis and the community of women, was acquired by the Victoria & Albert Museum Special Collections, Word and Image.

In 2011 her solo installation 'What Escapes' was shown at Goldsmiths, University of London.

From July 2014 to February 2015 her solo installation 'This Time in History, What Escapes (2014- 1914)' was exhibited at the Victoria and Albert Museum, London.

In 2017 her solo installation This Time in History, What Escapes /Afghanistan was exhibited in Summerhall Edinburgh Festival programme.

Frain's Catalogue Raisonné – a hardback survey publication, title 'Rose Frain', ISBN 978-1-9161555-0-3 with extensive colour images and artist-authored texts, presenting eighteen major projects covering more than five decades of art making, was published in 2019 by Sissy Graffiti. Edited by Jane Warrilow, designed by James Brook, with full chronology and related critical essays, the book was realised via an award from Creative Scotland.

Related survey exhibitions were held at Glasgow Women's Library (September 2019), Newcastle University Department of Fine Art (October 2019) and the Special Collections Exhibition Space, Goldsmiths, University of London (November 2019-January 2020), along with new works.

She has been a visual arts Advisor to the Scottish Arts Council, now Creative Scotland., taught at Northumbria University and Sheffield Hallam University, and is invited as Guest Artist nationally and internationally, for example to The School of Visual Arts New York, The Institute of Romance Studies University of London, the Hatton Gallery Newcastle.

Rose Frain's continuing project was This Time in History. She was a recipient of an Art360 Foundation Scotland bursary to conserve and promote her artistic legacy.
