= On the Inside =

On the Inside may refer to:

- On the Inside (film), a 2011 film with Nick Stahl and Olivia Wilde
- On the Inside (album), a 2004 album by Alvin Slaughter
- "On the Inside" (The Walking Dead), an episode from the eleventh season of The Walking Dead
- "On the Inside" (song), a song performed by Lynne Hamilton used as the theme music to the Australian soap opera Prisoner
- "On the Inside", a 2009 song by Daughtry from Leave This Town
