= British and International Golf Greenkeepers Association =

Professional organisation

BIGGA, the British and International Golf Greenkeepers Association was officially formed in 1987. The association represents the interests of greenkeepers and progresses and develops of the profession of greenkeeping. It organises its annual BIGGA Turf Managers Exhibition (BTME) held at Harrogate Convention Centre in January . https://www.btme.org.uk

== History ==
BIGGA was formed from three existing associations, the British Golf Greenkeepers Association [BGGA], the English and International Greenkeepers Association [EIGGA] and the Scottish and International Greenkeepers Association [SIGGA].

The association offers several membership levels:

- Full membership, for those employed in the maintenance of sports turf at a sports facility
- Associate Member, for those employed in the maintenance of sports turf but do not hold NVQ/SVQ qualification or have three years continuous relative experience
- Student membership, for those studying a relevant course
- Affiliate membership, for those not working as greenkeepers but with an interest in the subject, such as equipment manufacturers.

== Benefits to membership ==
Benefits to membership include reduced price BIGGA education material, as well as discount clothing and insurance. BIGGA runs training courses in all subjects relevant to the modern greenkeeper, and publishes a monthly magazine, Greenkeeper International. and invites all members to attend BTME, which runs every January in Harrogate.
