= Sanford Dennis Biggar =

Early 20th-century mayor of Hamilton, Ontario, Canada

Sanford Dennis Biggar (November 5,1861 – March 5, 1920) was mayor of Hamilton, Ontario from 1905 to 1906.

== Early life ==
Biggar was born on November 5, 1861, in Saltfleet Township in Hamilton, Ontario, to Christopher Biggar and Ann Dean.

== Personal life ==
Biggar married Charlotte Elizabeth Armstrong and had 6 children.

On March 5, 1920, Biggar died and was buried in Hamilton Graveyard.
