= Kyle Biggar =

Canadian biochemist and molecular biologist

- Born: 1986; Summerside, Prince Edward Island, Canada
- Awards: John Charles Polanyi Prize (2016)

Kyle K. Biggar (born 1986) is a Canadian biochemist and molecular biologist. He has been a professor of biochemistry, chemistry, and biology at Carleton University in Ottawa, Canada since 2017. Biggar was the 2016 recipient of the John Charles Polanyi Prize for his outstanding work in early career research.

== Biography ==
Kyle Kevin Biggar was born in 1986 in Summerside, Prince Edward Island. Biggar studied Biology and Chemistry at St. Francis Xavier University (B.Sc) in Antigonish, Nova-Scotia, Canada, and Biology and Biochemistry at Carleton University (Ph.D 2013). His doctoral research focused on the biochemistry of physiological stress response. The well-known Canadian biochemist Kenneth B. Storey was his thesis advisor during his graduate studies at Carleton University. After completing a post-doctoral fellowship at the University of Western Ontario Schulich School of Medicine and Dentistry, Biggar came back to his alma mater to become an assistant professor of Biochemistry as of 2016.

== Research ==
Biggar's research includes many different areas from different fields within molecular biology, biochemistry, and physical biochemistry. His main areas of research interest are Oxidative Cell Stress, Functional Proteomics, Bioinformatics, and Molecular Pharmacology. He is particularly known for his research in the new field of Non-histone Lysine Methylation and its relation to both functional proteomics and cell stress.

== Professional honours ==
Biggar was the 2016 recipient of the John Charles Polanyi Prize for outstanding work in early career research in peptide therapeutics.

== Selected recent publications ==
- Biggar, K.K., and Storey, K.B. Functional impact of non-coding RNA regulation in extreme stress adaptation. J. Mol. Cell. Biol. In Press. doi.org/10.1093/jmcb/mjx053
- Biggar, K.K., Wang Z. and Li, S. SnapShot: Lysine methylation beyond histones. Mol. Cell 68(5):1016–1016.e1. Invited submission
- Singal, S.S., Nygard, K.*, Biggar, K.K.*, Shehab, M.A., S.S.C. Li, Jansson, T. and Gupta, M.B. Interaction between IGFBP-1, protein kinase CSNK-2 and mTOR in HepG2 cells as demonstrated by dual immunofluorescence and in situ PLA. Am. J. Pathol. In press, doi.org/10.1016/j.ajpath.2017.09.009
- Biggar, K.K., Dawson, N.J. and Storey, K.B. Native protein denaturation using urea. Biotechniques 62(1): xiii (epub)
- Shehab, M.A., Biggar, K.K., Singal, S.S., Nygard, K., Li, S.S.C., Jansson, T. and Gupta, M.B. Exposure of decidualized HESC to low oxygen tension and leucine deprivation results in increased IGFBP-1 phosphorylation and reduced IGF-I bioactivity. Mol. Cell. Endo. 452:1-14
- Wu, Z., Connolly, J. and Biggar, K.K. Beyond histones: The expanding roles of lysine methylation. FEBS J. 284(17): 2732-2744
- Biggar, K.K. and Storey, K.B. Exploration of low temperature microRNA function in an anoxia tolerant vertebrate ectotherm, the red eared slider turtle (Trachemys scripta elegans). J. Thermal Biol. In Press
- Wu, C.W., Biggar, K.K., Luu, B.E., Szereszewski, K.E. and Storey, K.B. Analysis of microRNA expression during the torpor-arousal cycle of a mammalian hibernator, the 13-lined ground squirrel. Physiol. Genomics DOI: 10.1152/physiolgenomics.00005.2016
