= Alexander Biggar (footballer) =

Scottish footballer

Personal information
- Place of birth: New Cumnock, Scotland
- Position: Outside left

Senior career*
Years	Team	Apps	(Gls)
- Lanemark
1913	Bradford City	1	(0)
- Tottenham Hotspur
- * Club domestic league appearances and goals

Alexander Biggar was a Scottish professional footballer who played as an outside left.

== Career ==
Born in New Cumnock, Biggar played for Lanemark, Bradford City and Tottenham Hotspur. For Bradford City, he made 1 appearance in the Football League.

== Sources ==
- Frost, Terry (1988). Bradford City A Complete Record 1903-1988. Breedon Books Sport. ISBN 0-907969-38-0.
