= Ruby Grierson =

British film-maker

- Born: 24 November 1903; Cambusbarron, Stirlingshire
- Died: 17 September 1940 (aged 36) mid-Atlantic Ocean
- Occupation: Documentary film-maker
- Relatives: John Grierson (brother), Marion Grierson (sister)

Ruby Isabel Grierson (24 November 1903 – 17 September 1940) was a Scottish documentary film director and producer, and a leading authority in the early documentary movement. Her brother John Grierson and her younger sister Marion Grierson also made films.

== Early life ==
Grierson was born in Cambusbarron, Stirlingshire, to Jane Anthony, a teacher from Ayrshire, a Labour Party activist who frequently took the chair at Tom Johnston's election meetings and a suffragette, and schoolmaster Robert Morrison Grierson from Boddam, near Peterhead. She had seven siblings: Agnes, Janet, Margaret, John, Anthony, Dorothy, and Marion. In 1906, Margaret passed away. Her family frequently held lively debates on social issues and it is said that Ruby inherited her passion for causes from her mother. All of the children were educated at a local school where their father was headmaster and all except for Margaret attended the University of Glasgow.

== Career ==
For a time, Grierson worked as a teacher in Edinburgh at an all-girls school and in the summer she worked for the GPO film unit. She then left her job as a teacher to work on documentary film making full-time at the Empire Marketing Board film unit. Her brother, John, and her younger sister Marion also worked at the unit and she would go on make her own films.

Grierson's commitment to pacifism and her political views informed her work in film and they typically focused on daily hardships.

== Death and legacy ==
In 1940, she was making a film on the evacuation of British children to Canada under the commission of the National Film Board of Canada. She was on the liner SS City of Benares when it was torpedoed mid-Atlantic. She was among those who died.

Grierson's death greatly affected her family, including her older brother, the "Father of Documentary", John Grierson. After her death, he emphasized her contribution to film in several episodes of his television program, This Wonderful World and his book, Grierson on Documentary.

In November 2022, Ruby and her sister Marion's work were featured in the GLEAN exhibition at Edinburgh's City Art Centre of 14 early women photographers working in Scotland. The exhibition also included photographs and films of Helen Biggar, Violet Banks, Christina Broom, Mary Ethel Muir Donaldson, Isobel Wylie Hutchison, Johanna Kissling, Margaret Fay Shaw and Margaret Watkins

== Filmography ==
- Housing Problems (Arthur Elton, Edgar Anstey, John Taylor, 1935), Ruby Grierson, uncredited assistants
- People of Britain (Ruby Grierson, 1936)
- London Wakes Up (Ruby Grierson, 1936)
- Today and Tomorrow (Ruby Grierson, 1936)
- To-day We Live (Ruby Grierson and Ralph Bond, 1937)
- Animal Kingdom - The Zoo and You (Ruby Grierson, 1938)
- Animals on Guard (Ruby Grierson, 1938)
- Cargo for Ardrossan (Ruby Grierson, 1939)
- Choose Cheese (Ruby Grierson, 1940)
- Green Food for Health (Ruby Grierson, 1940)
- Six Foods for Fitness (Ruby Grierson, 1940)
- What’s for Dinner? (Ruby Grierson, 1940)
- They Also Serve (Ruby Grierson, 1940)
