= Mary Ethel Muir Donaldson =

Photography pioneer and author

- Born: May 19, 1876; Norwood
- Died: January 17, 1958 (aged 81); Edinburgh
- Occupations: photographer and author
- Known for: photography in the remote Scottish Highlands

Mary Ethel Muir Donaldson known as M.E.M. Donaldson (19 May 1876 – 17 January 1958), was an early 20th century British author and photography pioneer, and described as an 'unconventional ethnographer'.

== Life ==
Her father, Alexander Murray Donaldson (1834-1883), had emigrated from Scotland to Adelaide, Australia and returned to settle with her mother, Mary Isabella Muir (1840-1926) to live in Norwood, Surrey, England, where Mary Ethel Muir Donaldson was born. Family connections with the Donaldson shipping line were likely the source of the family's money, which in turn allowed her to undertake her research and writing. In Croydon she met her life long friend, illustrator Isabel Bonus (whose family wealth also came from ship broking) and they moved to Scotland. (Isabel's aunt was the famous and unconventional Anna Kingsford (nee Bonus).)

She became a photographer to follow up her interest in her Scottish roots in the Clan Donald, in 1905 travelling to remote areas of Inverness-shire and Argyll with heavy photographic equipment. She wrote biographies of Scottish people (including herself) and also wrote about the religious differences in regions of Scotland. She was a 'High Anglican' and did not support the Scottish Presbyterian reformed church.

Her biography says 'she wanted to find a way of life which was a challenge both to her mind and to her body.'

Her images captured what were 'disappearing aspects' of rural life in the early 20th century. She was said to display sensitivity and artistic composition in her images, and also learned the sciences of chemistry and optics to process her photographs and modify the equipment she used. She worked with her friend and companion Isabel Bonus on the illustrations for some of her travel books until 'watercolour became too expensive' and she then used 900 photographs for her book Wanderings in the Western Highlands (1921) and apologised for the image quality.

In 1925 Donaldson and Bonus built a new house of local materials (blue granite and heather and turf roof) at Sanna Bheag ("Little Sanna"), in Sanna, Ardnamurchan. It was modern but thus blended with the landscape, and included a built-in darkroom for her photographic processes. The Inverness Museum has an image of Donaldson and the house.

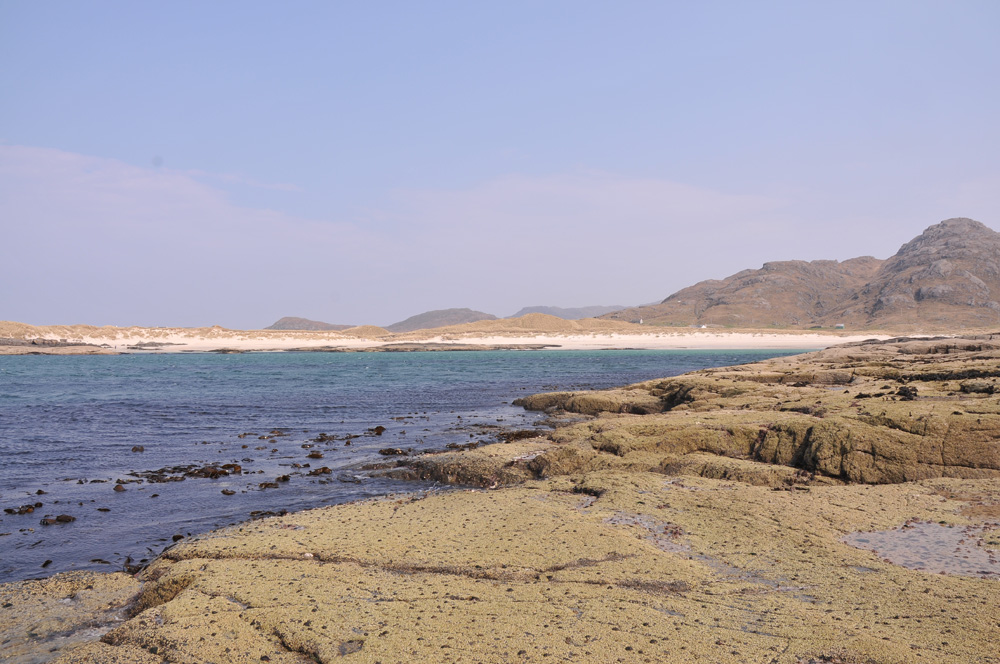
Sanna, Ardnamurchan

Bonus died in 1941, and the house burned down in 1947. Donaldson later lived in Cornwall then in Edinburgh where she died in 1958.

== Burial ==
Donaldson was buried in Isabel Bonus's grave in Oban and their headstone is inscribed:

HERE LIES THE

FOLDED GARMENT OF

ISABEL BONUS

BELOVED FRIEND DEPARTED THIS

LIFE AUGUST 9TH 1941

WHEN THOU REWARDEST THY SAINTS

O LORD REMEMBER HER FOR GOOD

HERE ALSO LIE THE MORTAL REMAINS OF

M.E.M. DONALDSON, HER BELOVED FRIEND

WHO WROTE BOOKS IN DEFENCE OF SCOTLANDS

FAITHFUL REMNANT, THE SCOTTISH EPISCOPAL

CHURCH, DEPARTED THIS LIFE ON 17TH JAN. 1958

"GOD BE MERCIFUL TO ME A SINNER"

== Published works ==
- Isles of Flame (1913)
- Tonal Mactonal (1919)
- Wanderings in the Western Highlands (1921)
- Islemen of Bride (1922)
- Further Wanderings - mainly in Argyll (1926)
- Scotland's Suppressed History (1935)
- Scottish Biographies (1938)
- 'Till Scotland Melts in Flame' talks on Scottish church history for young people, etc.(1949)

== Legacy ==
Over a thousand of her glass-plate negatives (1049), mostly landscapes are in the Inverness Museum and Art Gallery and a further 123, mainly portraiture in the National Museum of Scotland : donated by her biographer, John Telfer Dunbar.

One of the NMS images epitomises her style, it is of Lauchlan MacAskill 'with a peat spade, his pet dog and kitten' at Laig Bay, Isle of Eigg.

In November 2022 Donaldson's work featured in the GLEAN exhibition at Edinburgh's City Art Centre of 14 early women photographers working in Scotland.
