= Margaret Watkins =

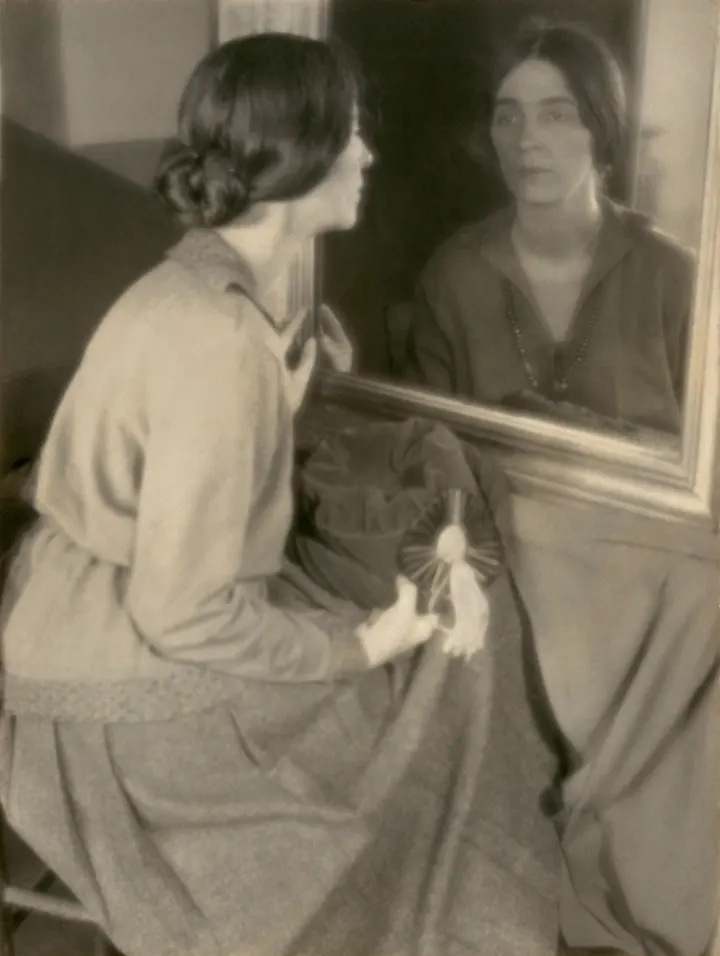
Margaret Watkins by Frances Bode, 1921

Margaret Watkins (1884–1969) was a Canadian photographer who is remembered for her innovative contributions to advertising photography. She was also a pioneering modernist photographer; her still-life images of household objects arranged in compositions influenced by abstract art were highly innovative and influential.

She lived a life of rebellion, rejection of tradition, and individual heroism; she never married, she was a successful career woman in a time when women stayed at home, and she exhibited eroticism and feminism in her art and writing.

== Early life ==
The daughter of an Ontario businessman and his Scottish wife, Watkins was born in Hamilton, Ontario on November 8, 1884. Growing up, Watkins exhibited a keen eye for design and craftsmanship, and by age 15 she was selling her own crafts in her father's department store. She also played piano and sang in the Centenary Methodist Church Choir. In 1908 Watkins left home to work at the Roycroft Arts and Crafts community and Sidney Lanier Camp. It was at these two rural utopian communities in northeast United States where she would start to learn photography.

In 1913, she moved to Boston, where she worked as an assistant in a commercial photography studio. Outside of her photography job, she wrote poetry and sang Mendelssohn and Wagner with the Temple Israel Choir. Later she landed a job with photographer Alice Boughton, in New York and she began studying with Clarence H. White at his schools in New York and Maine, where Alfred Stieglitz was one of the instructors. Her courses at the Clarence H. White Summer School of Photography in Maine, was where her interest in photography was solidified and later on she would teach there.

== Career ==
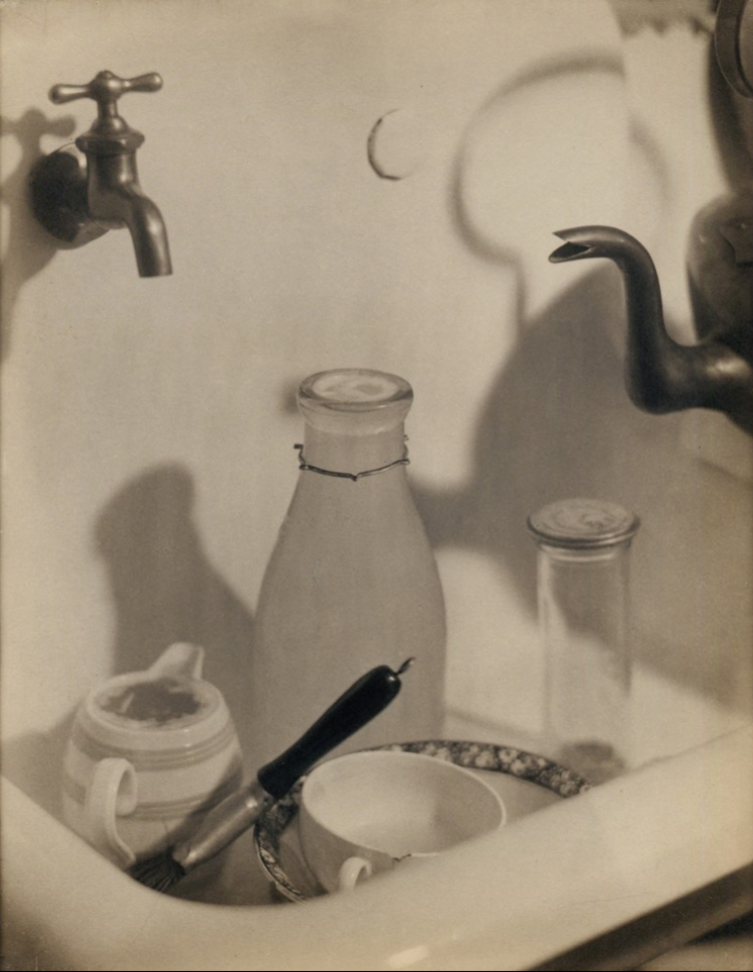
Margaret Watkins: The Kitchen Sink, 1919

Watkins opened a studio in Greenwich Village, New York City, and in 1920 became editor of the annual publication Pictorial Photography in America. She worked successfully as an advertising photographer for Macy's and the J. Walter Thompson Company and Fairfax, becoming one of the first women photographers to contribute to advertising agencies. She also produced landscapes, portraits, nudes and still lifes. Her portrait subjects included many figures from the art world of New York of the time, including Sergei Rachmaninov, Ezra Winter, and Kenneth Hayes Miller. While teaching at the Clarence White school from 1916 to 1928, her students included Margaret Bourke-White, Laura Gilpin, Paul Outerbridge, Ralph Steiner and Doris Ulmann.

One of the earliest art photographers in advertising, her images of everyday objects set new standards of acceptability. In 1928, Watkins embarked on a planned three-month holiday to Europe, which ended with her moving permanently to Glasgow, Scotland to care for three ailing aunts. From 1928, when she was based in Glasgow, she embarked on street photography in Russia, Germany and France, specializing in store fronts and displays. She died in Glasgow in 1969, largely forgotten as a photographer.

== Legacy ==
Watkins' legacy exists in her exemplary work left behind, but also her example as an independent, successful woman. The Queen's Quarterly suggests her life is an inspiration for single women, who are fulfilled by their careers, rather than the traditional gender roles women face of fulfillment through marrying and having children.

Before she died, Watkins handed over a sealed box of all her work to her neighbor and executor of her will, Joseph Mulholland. She gave him strict instructions not open it until after she died. Though it took more than a decade, several solo exhibitions were subsequently held in Britain and North America, most notably the Light Gallery in New York (1984). When she died in November 1969, she left most of her estate to music charities.

In October 2012, a retrospective exhibition of Margaret Watkins' work titled "Domestic Symphonies" opened at the National Gallery of Canada. This exhibition showcased 95 of her photographs dating from 1914 to 1939, including portraits, landscapes, modern still lifes, street scenes, advertising work, and commercial designs. Music was a vital inspiration for Watkins, as can be seen from the title of the exhibition.

A stamp depicting Watkins' photograph, The Kitchen Sink was issued on March 22, 2013 by Canada Post as part of their Canadian Photography series. The image is a still life of a sink with dishes.

In 2021, one hundred and fifty of her photographs were included in the PhotoEspana exhibition in Madrid, Spain and in November 2022 her work featured in the GLEAN exhibition at Edinburgh's City Art Centre of 14 early women photographers working in Scotland.
