= City Art Centre =

Art gallery in Edinburgh, Scotland

Coordinates: 55.9510°N 3.1893°W

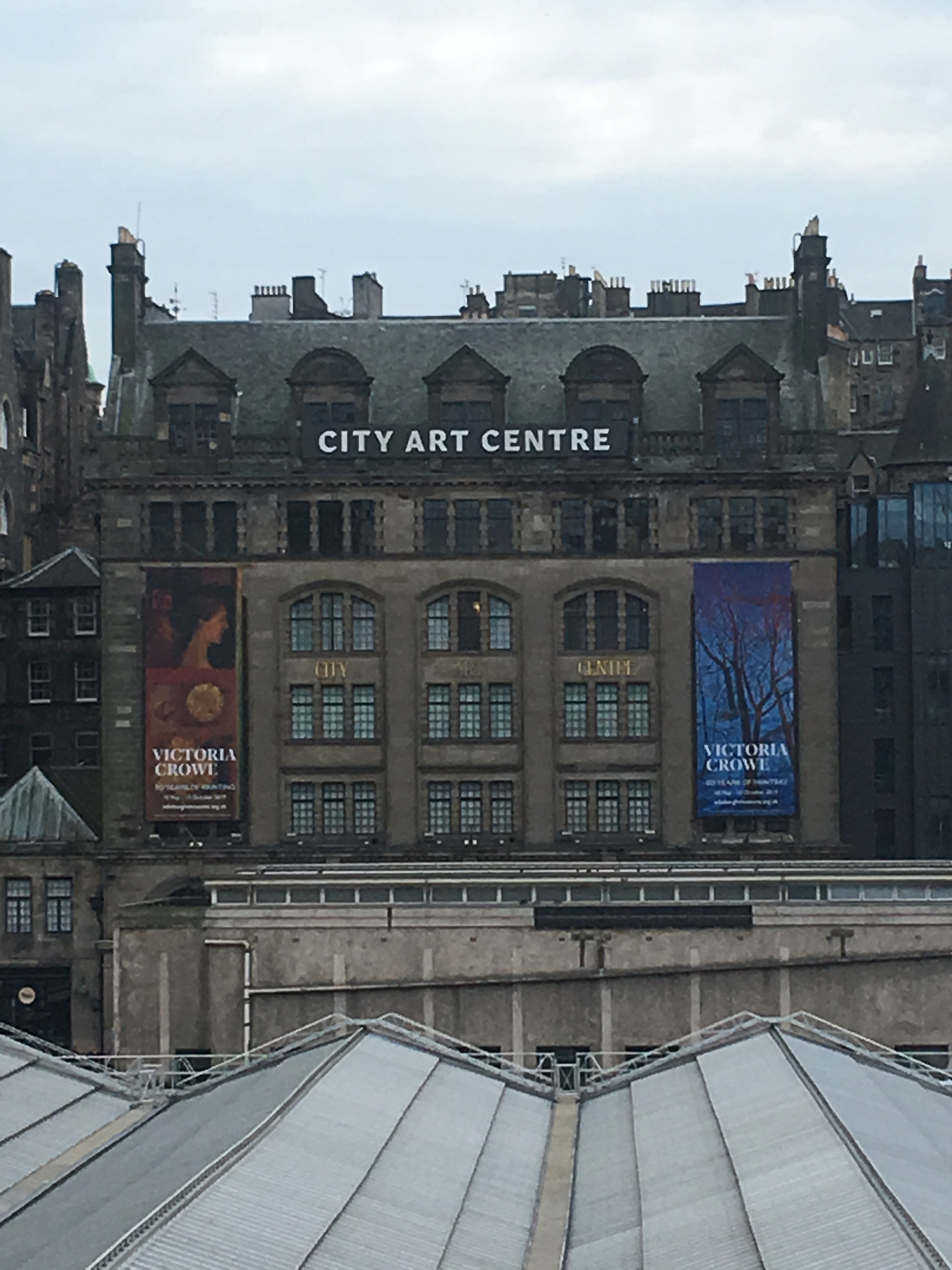
- The City Art Centre viewed from the north
- Established: 1980; 46 years ago
- Location: 2 Market St, Edinburgh EH1 1DE, Scotland, United Kingdom
- Type: Art museum
- Key holdings: The Scottish Art Collection of City of Edinburgh Museums and Galleries; The Taking of Excalibur
- Visitors: 85,080 (2023/24)
- Curator: Helen Scott
- Architects: James Dunn; James Findlay
- Owner: City of Edinburgh Council
- Public transit access: Edinburgh Waverley
- Website: www.edinburghmuseums.org.uk/venue/city-art-centre

Listed Building – Category A
- Official name: 1-6 (Inclusive Nos) Market Street, City Art Centre
- Designated: 12 December 1974
- Reference no.: LB30139

The City Art Centre is part of the Museums & Galleries Edinburgh, which sits under the Culture directorate of the City of Edinburgh Council. The City Art Centre has a collection which include historic and modern Scottish painting and photography, as well as contemporary art and craft. It is an exhibition based venue with no permanent displays.

The City Art Centre is home to the City of Edinburgh's Recognised collection of Scottish Art. Edinburgh's fine art collection is approximately 4,800 pieces of Scottish work in a variety of mediums. Artists such Fergusson, Eardley, Paolozzi are represented in the collection as well as many other Edinburgh-based and Scottish artists. Artists are represented dating from the 17th century to the present day.

== History ==
In 1971, the City Art Centre was housed in the former Royal High School. In 1975, the reform of the Scottish local government brought the City Museums and the City Art Centre together the new council directorate of the Recreation Department. The City Art Centre was then rehoused to its current Market Street location in 1980.

The current City Art Centre building dates from 1899 to 1902 and was the work of Dunn and Findlay. Built as an extension to the Scotsman newspaper office, it later became part of the city's wholesale fruit and vegetable market.

Designed as a nine-storey iron-framed warehouse, it is clad in stone to create a restrained Beaux Arts facade. It has public galleries on 6 floors.

The original conversion of the building in 1980 was undertaken by the City Architect's Department under the direction of the then City Architect, Brian Annable, and it garnered a RIBA Award for Architecture in 1983. In the 1990s more space was created by extending into the upper floors. Natural materials and neutral colours are used throughout the interior to create flexible contemporary exhibition spaces.

== Collections ==
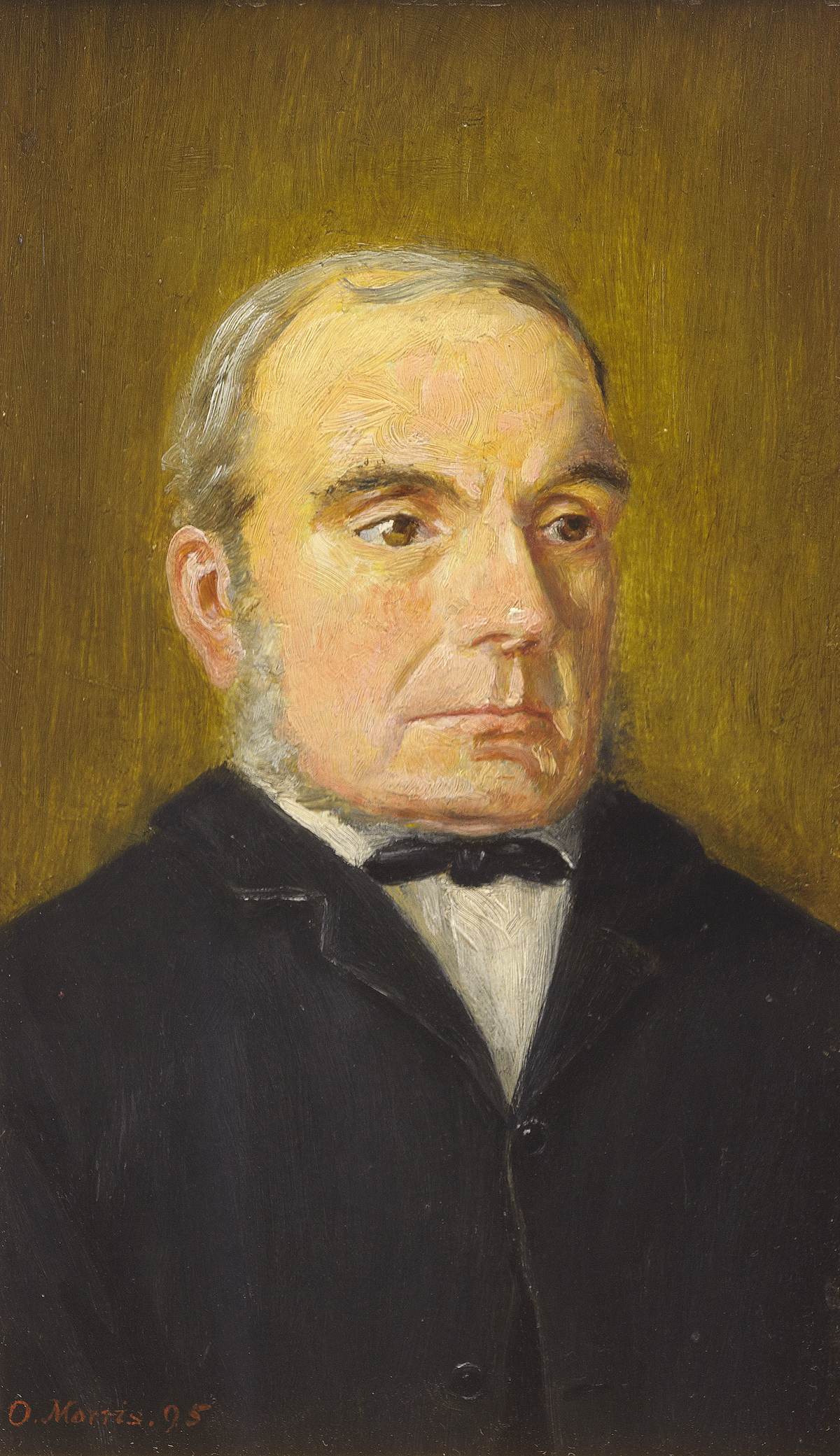
Painting of John Traill

In 1961, Miss Jean Watson, an Edinburgh resident, at first gave and then later bequeathed money to create a collection of Scottish Art for the City of Edinburgh. The fund is administered by the City Council and is still in use today. Soon after Miss Watson gave her initial sum of money, a Committee was formed to administer the funds. One of their first decisions was to commission a bronze bust of Miss Watson herself from a sculptor, Eric Schilsky. From the outset, the Committee opted to purchase contemporary works of art by Scottish artists or artists based in Scotland. One of their first purchases was Obsession by John Bellany. Since then, more than 900 paintings, drawings, sculpture, photographs and prints have been added. Works by contemporary artists such as Moyna Flannigan, Calum Colvin, Peter Howson and Dame Elizabeth Blackadder have all been acquired with Bequest Funds.

In 1964, more than 300 of the works owned by the Scottish Modern Arts Association were donated to the City of Edinburgh during the dissolution of the Scottish Modern Arts Association. These are now housed in the City Art Centre.

The Scottish Arts Council began collecting in 1951, with a focus on the purchase of artworks by contemporary Scottish based artists. In the mid-1990s the Scottish Arts Council decided to distribute its collection of approximately 2,000 works by contemporary Scottish artists to museums and galleries throughout Scotland. Institutions were given the opportunity to view the collection and submit proposals for acquisition, the City Art Centre applied and in 1998 received 123 works of art.

Through the National Collecting Scheme for Scotland, six major museums and art galleries, including the City Art Centre, have been able to acquire new works by contemporary artists. The Scheme has been in operation since 2003, and was established to assist museums and galleries throughout Scotland purchase work by contemporary artists and craft makers. To avoid duplication, each member gallery is invited to collect within a broad theme. In recognition of Edinburgh's World Heritage Site Status, the City Art Centre is acquiring works all of which have an urban or architectural theme. Since the scheme began, the City Art Centre have acquired a variety of work including film, photography and installation. Artists now represented include Toby Paterson, Christine Borland, Graham Fagen, Rosalind Nashashibi, Nathan Coley and Rose Frain.

In collaboration with Edinburgh Libraries, the Museums & Galleries Edinburgh show their collection on Capital Collections. Capital Collections is an image library which allows a selection of collections to be viewed.
