= Hutchinson (surname) =

Hutchinson is a northern English patronymic surname from the medieval personal name Hutchin, a pet form of Hugh. Notable people with the name include:

- Hutchinson Family Singers, 19th-century American singing group
- A. S. M. Hutchinson (1879–1971), British novelist
- Amos Hutchinson (1920–1990), American politician
- Amy Hutchinson (reformer) (1888–1985), New Zealand maternity reformer
- Amy Hutchinson (weaver) (1874–1971), New Zealand artist and weaver
- Abby Hutchinson Patton (1829–1892), performed with siblings as part of a Hutchinson Family Singers.
- Aidan Hutchinson (born 2000), American football player
- Alain Hutchinson (born 1949), Belgian politician
- Alexander Hutchinson (disambiguation)
- Allan Hutchinson (born 1951), British-Canadian lawyer
- Allen Hutchinson (1855–1929), English sculptor
- Anderson Hutchinson (1798–1852), American judge
- Andrew Hutchinson (wrestler), British wrestler
- Andrew Hutchinson (ice hockey) (born 1980), American ice hockey player
- Andrew Hutchinson (author) (born 1979), Australian writer, from Melbourne
- Andy Hutchinson (born 1992), English footballer
- Angela Hutchinson Hammer (1870–1952), American newspaperwoman
- Anne Hutchinson (1591–1642), Puritan preacher in New England
- Anne-Marie Hutchinson (1957–2020), British lawyer
- April Hutchinson (born 1976), Canadian Powerlifter and Activist
- Arthur Stuart-Menteth Hutchinson (1880–1971), British novelist
- Asa Hutchinson, Governor of Arkansas and former US Representative
- Atiba Hutchinson, Canadian football/soccer player
- Ava Hutchinson (born 1983), Irish long-distance runner
- Billy Hutchinson, Progressive Unionist Party
- Bret Hutchinson (born 1964), Australian rules footballer
- Buel Hutchinson (1826–1902), American lawyer and politician
- Cassidy Hutchinson, executive assistant for White House chief of staff Mark Meadows
- Chad Hutchinson, NFL quarterback
- Charles L. Hutchinson, businessman, philanthropist, and president of the Art Institute of Chicago
- Claud Mackenzie Hutchinson (1869–1941), English bacteriologist
- Crete Hutchinson (1884–1970), American writer
- Dennis J. Hutchinson, professor of law
- Donald P. Hutchinson, American politician
- Earl Ofari Hutchinson, American author and media critic
- Eberly Hutchinson (1871–1951), New York politician
- Edward Hutchinson (disambiguation), several people
- Elizabeth Hutchinson Jackson (1745–1781), mother of Andrew Jackson, 7th US president
- Eric Hutchinson, American singer-songwriter
- Foster Hutchinson (Canadian judge) (1761–1815)
- Francis Hutchinson (1660–1739), Church of England official against witchcraft trials
- F. W. Hutchinson (Francis William Hutchinson, 1910–1990), pioneering HVACR engineer and member of ASHRAE Hall of Fame
- Fred Hutchinson (1919–1964), MLB pitcher and manager
- Fred Hutchinson (rugby union) (1867–1941), Welsh rugby union international
- G. Evelyn Hutchinson (1903–1991), British zoologist and ecologist
- George Wylie Hutchinson (1852–1942), Canadian painter and illustrator
- Gregory Hutchinson (disambiguation), several people
- Guy Hutchinson, Author and comedian
- Henry Neville Hutchinson (1856–1927), English writer and naturalist
- Ian Hutchinson, professional motorcycle road racer
- James Hutchinson (VC) (1895–1972), British recipient of the Victoria Cross during World War I
- James Hutchinson (musician) aka "Hutch" Hutchinson, American bassist and studio musician
- James S. Hutchinson, early explorer of the Sierra Nevada, California, USA
- Jeffrey Hutchinson (1962–2025), American executed mass murderer
- Jeremy Hutchinson (politician), American congressman
- Jeremy Hutchinson, Baron Hutchinson of Lullington, British life peer
- Joey Hutchinson, English footballer
- John Hutchinson (disambiguation), several people
- Jonathan Hutchinson (1828–1913), English surgeon, ophthalmologist, dermatologist, venereologist and pathologist
- Josephine Hutchinson (1903–1998), American actress
- Leonard Hutchinson (died 1554), Master of University College, Oxford, England
- Leslie Hutchinson (1900–1969), known as "Hutch", Grenada-born singer and socialite
- Lucy Hutchinson (actress) (born 2003), English former child actress
- Lucy Hutchinson (1620–1681), English biographer
- Marcia Hutchinson (born 1962), British writer and politician
- Margaret Massey Hutchinson (1904–1997), English writer, teacher and naturalist
- Mark Hutchinson (disambiguation), several people
- Mary E. Hutchinson (1906–1970), American artist and art instructor
- Mavis Hutchinson, athlete
- Meg Hutchinson, singer/songwriter
- Michael Hutchinson (cyclist) (born 1973), Northern Irish racing cyclist, writer and journalist
- Michael Hutchinson (ice hockey) (born 1990), Canadian ice hockey goaltender
- Michael Hutchinson (politician), Belizean politician
- Paul Hutchinson, English footballer
- Peter Hutchinson (disambiguation), several people
- R. C. Hutchinson (Ray Coryton Hutchinson, 1907–1975), English novelist
- Ralph Hutchinson (1878–1935), American athlete and coach
- Ruth Hutchinson, Canadian figure skater
- Sam Hutchinson (born 1989), English footballer
- Steve Hutchinson (American football) (born 1977), American football player
- Steven Hutchinson (born 1968), German basketball coach and former player
- Susan A. Hutchinson (1873–1945), Brooklyn Museum librarian
- Thomas Hutchinson (disambiguation), several people
- Tim Hutchinson, US politician
- Tina Hutchinson (born 1964/1965), American basketball player
- William Hutchinson (disambiguation), several people
- Wondress Hutchinson (1964–2021), American musician
- Woods Hutchinson (1862–1930), English-American physician and writer
- Xavier Hutchinson (born 2000), American football player

== See also ==
- Hutchinson (disambiguation)
- Hutchison (disambiguation)
- Hutchins (surname)
- Hely-Hutchinson
- Grice-Hutchinson
