= Jenelle =

Jenelle is a given name. Notable people with the name (or close variants including Jennell and Jennelle) include:

- Jenelle Crooks (born 1994), Australian racing cyclist
- Jenelle Cunningham (born 1990), Trinidad and Tobago football defender
- Jenelle Hutcherson (born 1985), American hair artist, activist, public figure, designer, youth mentor and visionary
- Jenelle Kohanchuk (born 1990), American ice hockey forward
- Jenelle Porter, American art curator and author of exhibition catalogs and essays
- Jenelle Riley (born 1972), American screenwriter, actress, journalist, and producer
- Jenelle Roybal, Native American politician
- Jennell Hawkins (1938–2006), American r&b singer
- Jennell Jaquays (1956–2024), American game designer, artist
- Jennelle V. Moorhead (1903–1999), American educator
