= Hutchinson =

Hutchinson may refer to:

== Places ==
=== United States ===
- Hutchinson, Kansas
- South Hutchinson, Kansas
- Hutchinson, Minnesota
- Hutchinson, Pennsylvania
- Hutchinson, West Virginia, in Logan County
- Hutchinson, Marion County, West Virginia
- Hutchinson County, South Dakota
- Hutchinson County, Texas
- Hutchinson Island (Florida)
- Hutchinson Island South, Florida
- Hutchinson River, a river in New York
- Hutchinson River Parkway, running through Westchester County, New York, and the Bronx
- Hutchinson Township, McLeod County, Minnesota

=== Greenland ===
- Hutchinson Glacier

=== South Africa ===
- Hutchinson, Northern Cape

== People ==
- Hutchinson (surname)

== Companies ==
- Hutchinson Builders, Australian construction company
- Hutchinson SA, worldwide manufacturer of sealing solutions, insulation, fluid transfer systems and bicycle tires for all industries
- Hutchinson, an imprint of publishing house Hutchinson Heinemann

== Other uses ==
- Hutchinson Encyclopedia
- USS Hutchinson (PF-45), US frigate
- Hutchinson's teeth, a sign of congenital syphilis
- Hutchinson's ratio, concerning size differences between species
- Progeria, Hutchinson–Gilford progeria syndrome
- Hutchinson Patent Stopper, an invention for replacing cork bottle stoppers
- Hutchinson system, a system of plant taxonomy created by botanist John Hutchinson
- Hutchinson Internment Camp, based on the Isle of Man during World War II
- Hutchinson metric, a mathematical tool for fractals

== See also ==
- Hutch (disambiguation)
- Hutchison (disambiguation)
- Hutcheson
- Hutchesson
