= Hutcheson =

Hutcheson is a surname. Notable people with the surname include:

- Bellenden Hutcheson (1883–1954), VC recipient in World War I
- Charles Sterling Hutcheson (1894–1969), U.S. District judge for the Eastern District of Virginia
- David Hutcheson (footballer) (1892–1962), Scottish footballer
- Francis Hutcheson (philosopher) (1694–1746), philosopher
- Francis Hutcheson (songwriter) (c. 1722–1773), his son
- John Hutcheson, several people
  - Jock Hutcheson (fl. 1880s), Scottish footballer
  - John Conroy Hutcheson (1840–1897), British 19th century writer, author of nautical fiction books
  - John Hutcheson (1853–1940), Scottish-New Zealand politician
  - John Hutcheson (footballer) (1909–1979), Scottish footballer (Falkirk, Chelsea)
- Joseph Collier Hutcheson (1906–1972), Virginia lawyer and state senator, brother of Charles Sterling Hutcheson
- Joseph Chappell Hutcheson (1842–1924), Texas politician
- Thad Hutcheson (1915–1986), Texas Republican politician
- George Hutcheson (–1639), joint-founder with his younger brother Thomas Hutcheson, of Hutchesons Hospital, Glasgow.

== See also ==
- Hutchesson, surname
- Hutchison (disambiguation)
- Hutchinson (disambiguation)
