= Governor Hutchinson =

Governor Hutchinson may refer to:

- Asa Hutchinson (born 1950), Governor of Arkansas (2015-)
- Thomas Hutchinson (governor) (1711–1780), Governor of the Province of Massachusetts Bay from 1769 to 1774
- William Hutchinson (Rhode Island judge) (1586–1641), 2nd Judge (governor) of the Town of Portsmouth from 1639 to 1640

== See also ==
- Hutchinson (surname)
