= Hutchesson =

Hutchesson may refer to:

- Catherine Hutchesson, Australian politician
- Errol Hutchesson (born 1939), former Australian rules footballer
- Frank Hutchesson (1907–1969), former Australian rules footballer
- Tom Hutchesson, Australian rules footballer

== See also ==
- Hutcheson, surname
- Hutchinson (surname)
