= Paul Hutchison =

Paul Hutchisonmay refer to:

- Paul Hutchison (politician) (born 1947), New Zealand politician
- Paul Hutchison (English cricketer) (born 1977), English cricketer
- Paul Hutchison (Australian cricketer) (1968–2015), Australian cricketer

== See also ==
- Paul Hutchinson (born 1953), English footballer
