= John Hutchinson =

John Hutchinson may refer to:

== Arts ==
- John Hutchinson (writer) (1674–1737), English theologian and natural philosopher
- John Hutchinson, board operator for American radio program The David Lee Roth Show
- John Hutchinson, member of American singing group Hutchinson Family Singers
- Johnny Hutchinson, Irish musician, composer and DJ, (Born 1998), Known formerly as drummer Johnny ‘Doghead’ Hutch in the band Fat Dog and starring in Reggie Yates BBC Three documentary ‘Autistic Superstars’. Currently fronting the musical outfit ‘The Bar’.
- Johnny Hutchinson (born 1940), British drummer
- John 'Hutch' Hutchinson (1944-2021), British guitarist with David Bowie bands, between 1966 and 1973

== Sciences ==
- John Hutchinson (botanist) (1884–1972), English botanist
- John Hutchinson (surgeon) (1811–1861), surgeon and inventor of spirometer
- John Irwin Hutchinson (1867–1935), American mathematician
- John W. Hutchinson (born 1939), American professor of engineering at Harvard University

== Sports ==
- John Hutchinson (Australian rules footballer) (born 1936), Australian rules footballer
- John Hutchinson (rugby union) (born 1969), Canadian rugby union player
- John Hutchinson (association footballer) (born 1979), Australian-Maltese footballer

== Politics ==
- John Hutchinson (secretary), territorial secretary, namesake of Hutchinson County, South Dakota
- John Dyson Hutchinson (1822–1882), British Member of Parliament for Halifax, 1877–1882
- John G. Hutchinson (1935–2024), U.S. Representative from West Virginia, 1980–1981
- John Hely-Hutchinson, 2nd Earl of Donoughmore (1757–1832), Anglo-Irish politician, peer and soldier

== Other ==
- John Hutchinson (Roundhead) (1615–1664), leader in the 17th-century Puritan revolt in Britain
- John Hutchinson (industrialist) (1825–1865), established the first chemical factory in Widnes, England
- John Hutchinson (academic) (born 1949), British academic in the Department of Government at the London School of Economics
- John Hutchinson (bishop) (1837–1897), Roman Catholic priest in Queensland, Australia

== See also ==
- Jonathan Hutchinson (1828–1913), English doctor
- John Hely-Hutchinson (disambiguation)
- John Hutcheson (disambiguation)
- John Hutchison (disambiguation)
- Jack Hutchinson (disambiguation)
