= Hutchinson micropolitan area =

The Hutchinson micropolitan area may refer to:

- The Hutchinson, Kansas micropolitan area, United States
- The Hutchinson, Minnesota micropolitan area, United States

== See also ==
- Hutchinson (disambiguation)
