= Grice-Hutchinson =

Grice-Hutchinson is an English surname.

== People with the surname ==
- George Grice-Hutchinson (1848–1906), English politician
- Marjorie Grice-Hutchinson (1908–2003), English economist

== See also ==
- Hutchinson (surname)
