= Alexander Hutchison =

Alexander Hutchison may refer to:

- Alexander Hutchison (poet), Scottish poet
- Alexander Hutchison (1838–1917), Australian politician, member of the New South Wales Legislative Assembly for Canterbury 1887–1891
- Alexander Hutchison (1838–1908), Australian politician, member of the New South Wales Legislative Assembly for Glen Innes 1889–1894
- Alexander Copland Hutchison (1786–1840), British surgeon
- Alexander Richard Hamilton Hutchison (1871–1930), British general
- Alex Hutchison (1864–1928), Scottish trade union leader

== See also ==
- Alexander Hutchinson (disambiguation)
