= Hutch =

Hutch may refer to:

== Places ==
- Hutch, Kentucky, an unincorporated community
- Hutchinson, Kansas ("Hutch"), a city
- Hutchinson River Parkway ("the Hutch")
- Fred Hutchinson Cancer Research Center ("The Hutch")

== People ==
- Hutch Dano (born 1992), American actor
- Hutch Harris, American singer-songwriter for The Thermals
- Ken Hutcherson (born 1952), football player and pastor
- James Hutchison (American politician) (born c. 1942), American politician
- James Hutchinson (musician) (born 1953), American bassist
- Leslie Hutchinson (1900–1969), singer
- Gareth Hutch (died 2016), Irish murder victim
- Hutch Jones (born 1959), American basketball player
- Gerry Hutch (born 1963), Irish criminal
- Hutch Maiava (born 1976), rugby league player
- Jesse Hutch (born 1981), actor

== Fictional characters ==
- Kenneth "Hutch" Hutchinson, in Starsky and Hutch
- Hutch, in Wallace & Gromit: The Curse of the Were-Rabbit
- Honeybee Hutch
- Edward "Hutch" Hutchins, in the novel Rosemary's Baby and its adaptations
- Hutch Mansell, in the 2021 film Nobody and its sequel

== Companies ==
- Hutch BMX, a bicycle manufacturer
- Hutch (Sri Lanka), a mobile network in Sri Lanka
- Vodafone Essar, formerly known as Hutch Essar

== Other uses ==
- Calf hutch, a type of enclosure used for dairy calves
- Hutch (animal cage), a type of cage utilized primarily for housing domestic rabbits
- Hutch (furniture), a form of furniture
- Hutch (synchrotron), a type of radiation shielding
- The Hutch, a 2013 album by Steak Number Eight
- Hutch, a trough, used in ore dressing
- Mine hutch
- "Hutch", a song by Big Red Machine from the album How Long Do You Think It's Gonna Last?

== See also ==
- Hutchinson (disambiguation)
- Hutchison (disambiguation)
