= John Hutcheson (disambiguation) =

John or Jock Hutcheson may refer to:

- Jock Hutcheson (fl. 1880s), Scottish footballer
- John Conroy Hutcheson (1840–1897), British 19th century writer, author of nautical fiction books
- John Hutcheson (1853–1940), Scottish-New Zealand politician
- John Hutcheson (footballer) (1909–1979), Scottish footballer (Falkirk, Chelsea)

== See also ==
- John Hutchison (disambiguation)
- John Hutchinson (disambiguation)
