= Alexander Hutchinson =

Alexander or Alex Hutchinson may refer to:

- Alexander Hutchinson (footballer) (1908–?), Scottish footballer
- Alexander Hutchinson (politician) (1764–1853), Vermont politician who served as state auditor
- Alex Hutchinson (musician) (born 1934), Australian jazz musician
- Alex Hutchinson (video game director), Australian video game director and designer

== See also ==
- Alexander Hutchison (disambiguation)
