= Jack Hutchinson =

Jack Hutchinson may refer to:

- Jack Hutchinson (Canadian football) (1932–2003), Canadian football player
- Jack Hutchinson (footballer, born 1880) (1880–1949), Australian rules footballer in the VFA
- Jack Hutchinson (footballer, born 2001), Australian rules footballer for the West Coast Eagles
- Jack Hutchinson (rugby league) (1923–2003), Australian rugby league player

== See also ==
- John Hutchinson (disambiguation)
- Jock Hutchison, Scottish-born golfer
