= Hutcherson =

Hutcherson is a surname. Notable people with the surname include:

- Bobby Hutcherson (1941–2016), American jazz vibraphonist and marimbist
- Dick Hutcherson (1931–2005), American businessman and a former stock car racer
- Jenelle Hutcherson, American hair artist, activist, public figure, designer, youth mentor and visionary
- Josh Hutcherson (born 1992), American film and television actor
- Ken Hutcherson (1952–2013), former American football linebacker in the National Football League
- Ron Hutcherson (1943–2022), former NASCAR Cup Series driver
- Sadarius Hutcherson (born 1998), American football player
- Solomon Hutcherson (born 1972), American mixed martial arts fighter
- Warren Hutcherson (born 1963) is, a veteran comedian and comedy writer from Baltimore, Maryland
