= John Hutchison =

John Hutchison may refer to:

- Jock Hutchison (John Waters Hutchison, 1884–1977), Scottish-American golfer
- John Hutchison (Canadian politician) (1817–1863), mayor of Toronto
- John Hutchison (sculptor) (1832–1910), Scottish sculptor
- John Duflon Hutchison (fl. 1860s), British merchant
- John Hutchison (architect) (1841–1908), Scottish architect
- Sir John Hutchison (diplomat) (1890–1965), British diplomat
- John de Mestre Hutchison (1862–1932), Royal Navy officer
- John A. Hutchison (born 1950), justice of the West Virginia Supreme Court of Appeals

== See also ==
- John Hutcheson (disambiguation)
- John Hutchinson (disambiguation)
