= Samuel Walkey =

Prolific author of boys' adventure fiction

- Born: 10 July 1871; Kilkhampton, Cornwall, England
- Died: 29 March 1953 (aged 81); Cliffden, Teignmouth, Devonshire, England
- Other name: S. Walkey
- Occupation: Bank Official
- Years active: 1895 – 1939
- Known for: Boys' adventure fiction
- Notable work: Rouges of the Fiery Cross

Samuel Walkey (10 July 1871 – 29 March 1953) was an English bank inspector, who used his spare time when travelling to write, and became a prolific author of boy's adventure fiction. Walkey wrote at least sixteen novels and hundreds of magazine stories. He contributed stories to magazines for more than 40 years.

== Early life ==
Samuel Walkey was born on 10 July 1871 at Kilkhampton, Cornwall, England. He was the son of Joshua Walkey (27 October 1828 – 1884), a draper.

Walkey entered the Devon and Cornwall Bank as a clerk at 16. He was a hard worker and was soon promoted. The 1891 census found Walkey boarding with the White family at 26 Fore Street, in Torpoint, across the river from Plymouth.

== Adult life ==
Sometime in the 1890s he became a bank-inspector and had to travel all over the West Country. Walkey was already a bank-inspector when he married Kathleen Agnes White (27 March 1873 – 15 June 1949), the daughter of draper Seymore White, whom Walkey was boarding with in Torpoint for the 1881 census. The couple were married at St. James's Church in Torpoint on 6 September 1897.

The couple had three children:

- Joyce Morwenna (26 July 1898 – 3 February 1988), who was the executor of her father's will.
- Howarth Seymour (13 May 1900 – 20 August 1970), who pursued a Naval Career, passing the exam for the Osborne Naval College at age 14. and being appointed Rear Admiral in 1956.
- John Christopher (18 October 1903 – 6 October 1989), who joined the Royal Engineers, held various command positions, including Engineer-in-Chief at the War Office, before retiring with the rank of Major General in 1957. (Note: John was evacuated from the Empire Windrush just before she sank in 1954.)

Walkey was appointed branch manager of the Devon and Cornwall Bank in Penzance in 1901. The Devon and Cornwall Bank was acquired by Lloyds in 1906. In 1908 Walkey was promoted to be manager of the new Lloyds bank at Newton Abbot, and the 1911 census found him visiting his widowed mother at his brother-in-law's house in Manchester, still a bank manager with Lloyds. He was still at Newton Abbott as he was crediting to help resolve a dispute between Lloyds and the Urban District Council over highway encroachment by the bank.

Walkey left Newton Abbot in 1921. In 1924, a press notice about a will for which he was executor says that he is with Lloyds Bank at Salisbury, In the 1939 register Walkey records his profession as Staff Controller Lloyds Bank, retired.

== Writing ==
Lofts states that Walkey took up writing boy's stories to while away his evenings alone. Sir Arthur Quiller-Couch, a fellow Cornishman, saw his writing and introduced him to Max Pemberton, until recently the editor of Chums in 1895. Adcock states that his wife encouraged him to start writing, but Walkey had his first serial in Chums two years before he got married.

Walkey wrote both boys' adventure fiction for a juvenile audience, and stirring romance fiction for an adult audience. However, by a huge measure, the bulk of his output was juvenile fiction. Adcock states that Walkey wrote two adult-oriented adventure novels for Cassell's, whereas Kemp and Mitchell state that Walkey published sixteen volumes of adventure fiction between 1897 and 1935.

In many cases Walkey published his stories as serials first, and then as novels. For example, in April 1901 Cassell and Co. were advertising that With Redskins on the Warpath was starting in Chums (calling it a splendid new serial). By October 1901 Cassell and Co were selling it as a book.

== Books ==
The following list of books is from the collated library catalogues on the Jisc Library Hub Discover site. No titles by Walker were available on Project Gutenberg on 12 May 2020. Only three of his books are available in online versions, as noted below.

Books by Walkey
No	Year	Title	Illustrator	Publisher	Pages	Notes
2	1897	In quest of Sheba's treasure : a perilous adventure by land and sea	G. Hutchinson	Frederick Warne, London	320, 32 p., [5] plates plus 13 illustrations: ill., 20 cm.	(Note: Available on-line at the British Library)
1	1897	'Rogues of the Fiery cross'	Paul Hardy	Cassell & Co, London	cm.18	(Note: Available on-line at the British Library. This book was part of the standard stock of Boots Circulating Libraries in 1903.)
3	1899	For the sake of the Duchesse : a page from the life of the Vicomte de Championnet		J.W. Arrowsmith, Bristol	409, [4] p., 19 cm.	(Note: Adult Fiction. Three versions of this book are available online at the HathiTrust, and one of these versions is also available at the Internet Archive . This book was part of the standard stock of Boots Circulating Libraries in 1903.)
4	1901	At Britain's call : dramas of a memorable year		Cassell & Co, London	127 p., 22 cm.	(Note: Cassells Sixpenny Editions)
5	1901	With Redskins on the Warpath		Cassell & Co, London	vii, 280 pages, 8 fp plates, (8º)	
6	1904	The Lovers of Lorraine: a romance		Cassell & Co, London	viii. 328 pages, (8º)	(Note: Adult Fiction)
7	1906	Kidnapped by pirates	Paul Hardy	Frederick Warne, London	ix, 299 pages, [5] leaves of plates : illustrations, 19 cm.	
8	1910	Yo-ho! for the Spanish main : a story of adventure among pirates	Archibald Webb	Cassell & Co, London	311 pages, 4 unnumbered leaves of col plates : illustrations, 22 cm	
9	1914	Wolf-on-the-Trail: a tale of adventure among Redskins, etc.	C. Dudley Tennant	Cassell & Co, London	vi, 309 pages, (8º)	
10	1919	In quest of a kingdom		Cassell & Co, London	318 pages, 4 plates : illustrations, 22 cm	(Note: Cassell's empire library for boys and girls)
11	1920	Hurrah! for Merry Sherwood, etc.	C. E. Brock	Cassell & Co, London	312 pages, (8º)	(Note: Cassell's empire library for boys and girls)
12	1921	For Drake and Merrie England: a rousing story of the days of Good Queen Bess and the sea-dogs of old England		Cassell & Co, London	280 p., [4] leaves of plates : ill. (1 col.), 19 cm.	
13	1928	The Pirates of El Dorado		Aldine, London	(8º)	(Note: Aldine Adventure Library. no. 16.)
14	1931	The adventures of Jack-a-Lantern	Alfred Elmore, Charles Monnet, Charles Louis Müller	The Sheldon Press, London	vi, 314p., 5 plates : illus. (some col.), 19 cm.	(Note: The work of famous painters was used to illustrate the book, rather than having an illustrator in the usual way.)
15	1935	When the Vikings came		Burns Oates & Washbourne Ltd, London		(Note: Publisher identity from Abe Books, as not in Jisc catalogue.)
16	1935	The treasure of Pirates' Island		SPCK, London	287 pages, (8º)	
17	1936	General Gordon, 1833-1885		A. Wheaton, Exeter	52 pages : illustrations, frontispiece (portrait), 19 cm.	(Note: Makers of history no. 15)

=== Example of illustrations for a Walkey book ===
Paul Hardy was frequently an illustrator for Walkey after he illustrated Rogues of the Fiery Cross. This was Walkey's second serial story, and the second novel he published. It appeared in Chums in the 1896 – 1897 volume and it was a huge success. It was illustrated by Hardy, as was almost all of Walkey's subsequent work in Chums. The story was almost immediately published as a book by Cassell & Co., London in 1897 with sixteen full-page illustrations (courtesy of the British Library, as shown below:

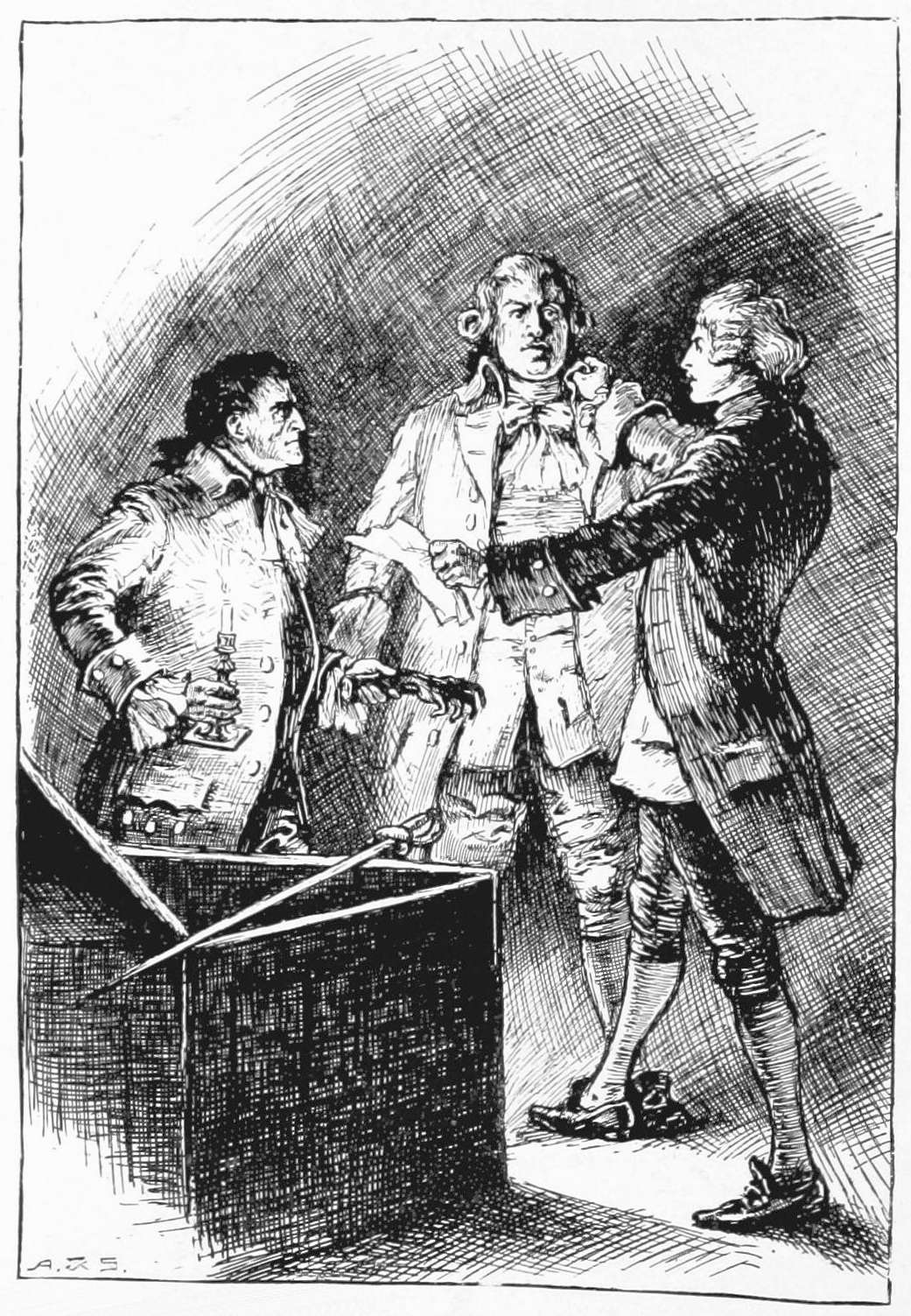
I caught him by the collar

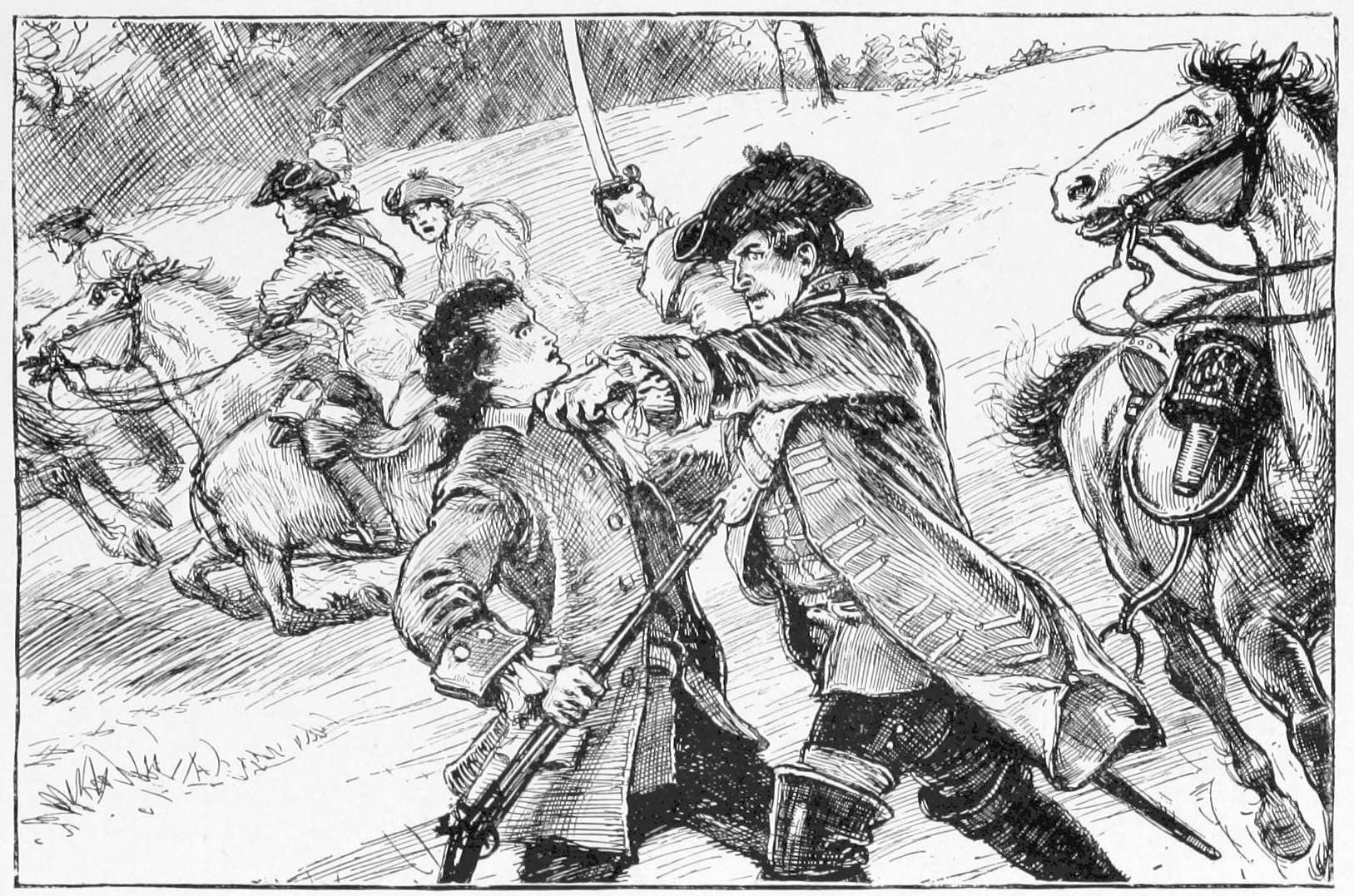
One caught me roughly by the throat

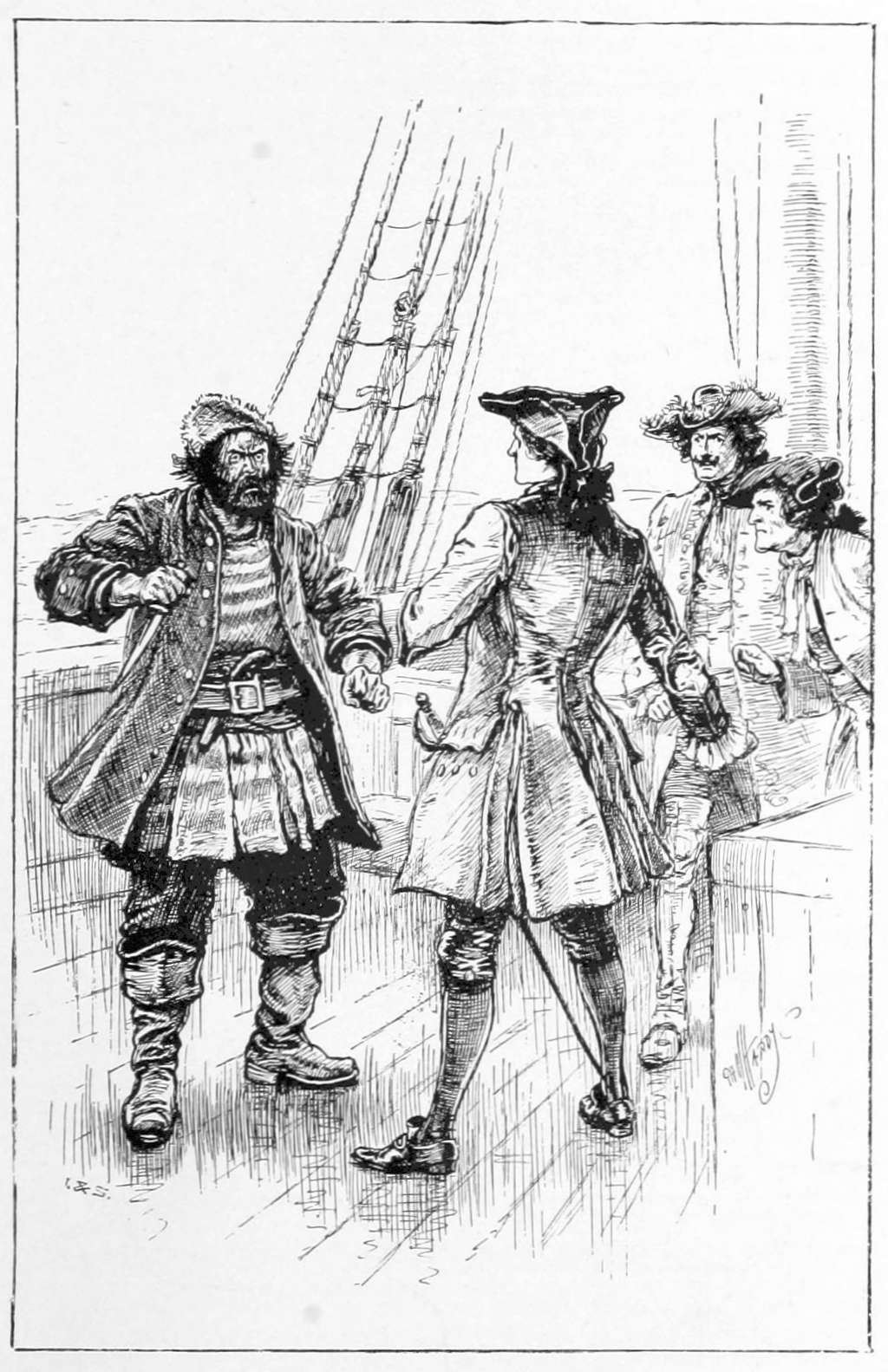
He drew a knife

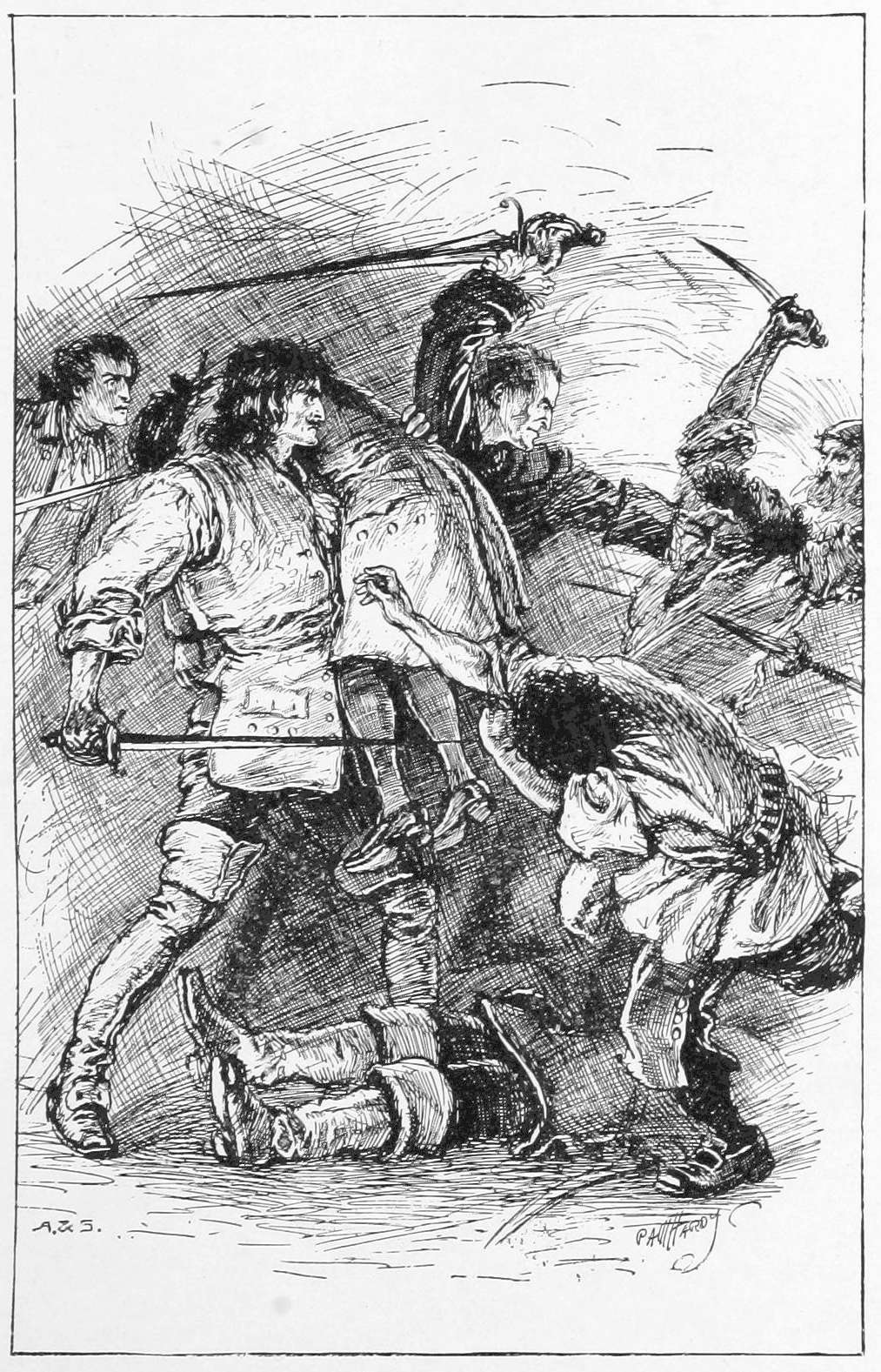
His sword came swinging down

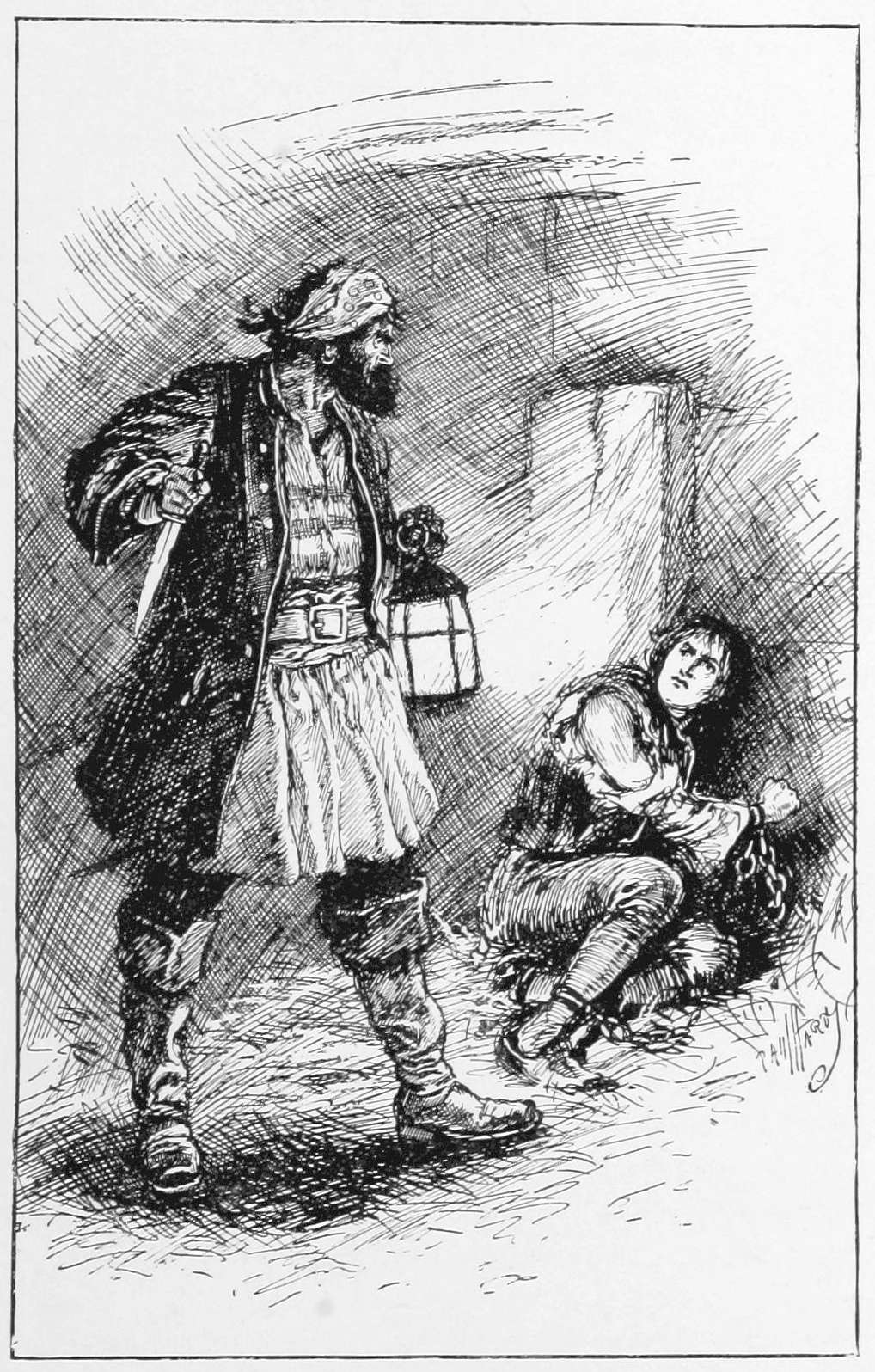
Turn over- he cried

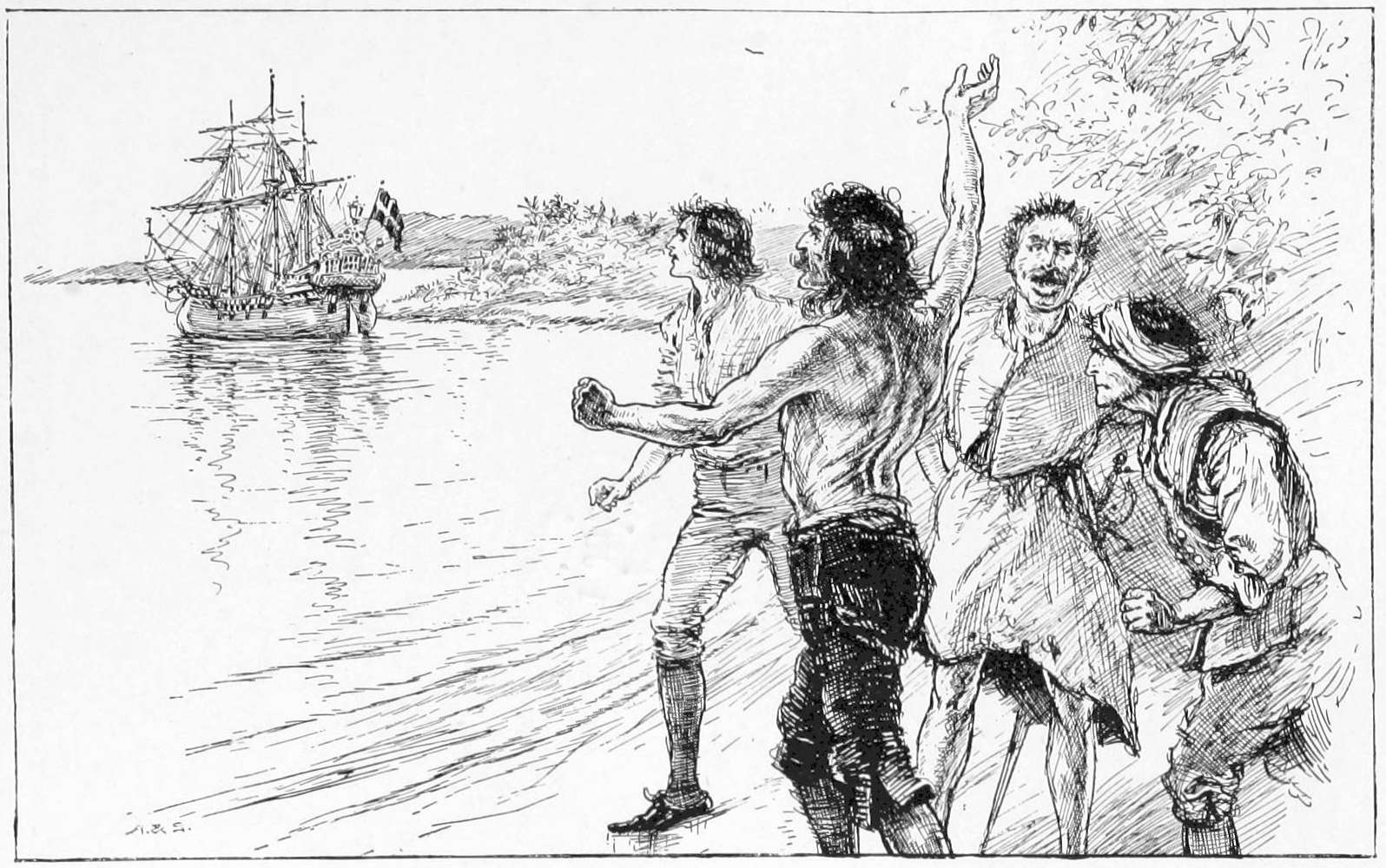
A ship lay in the lagoon

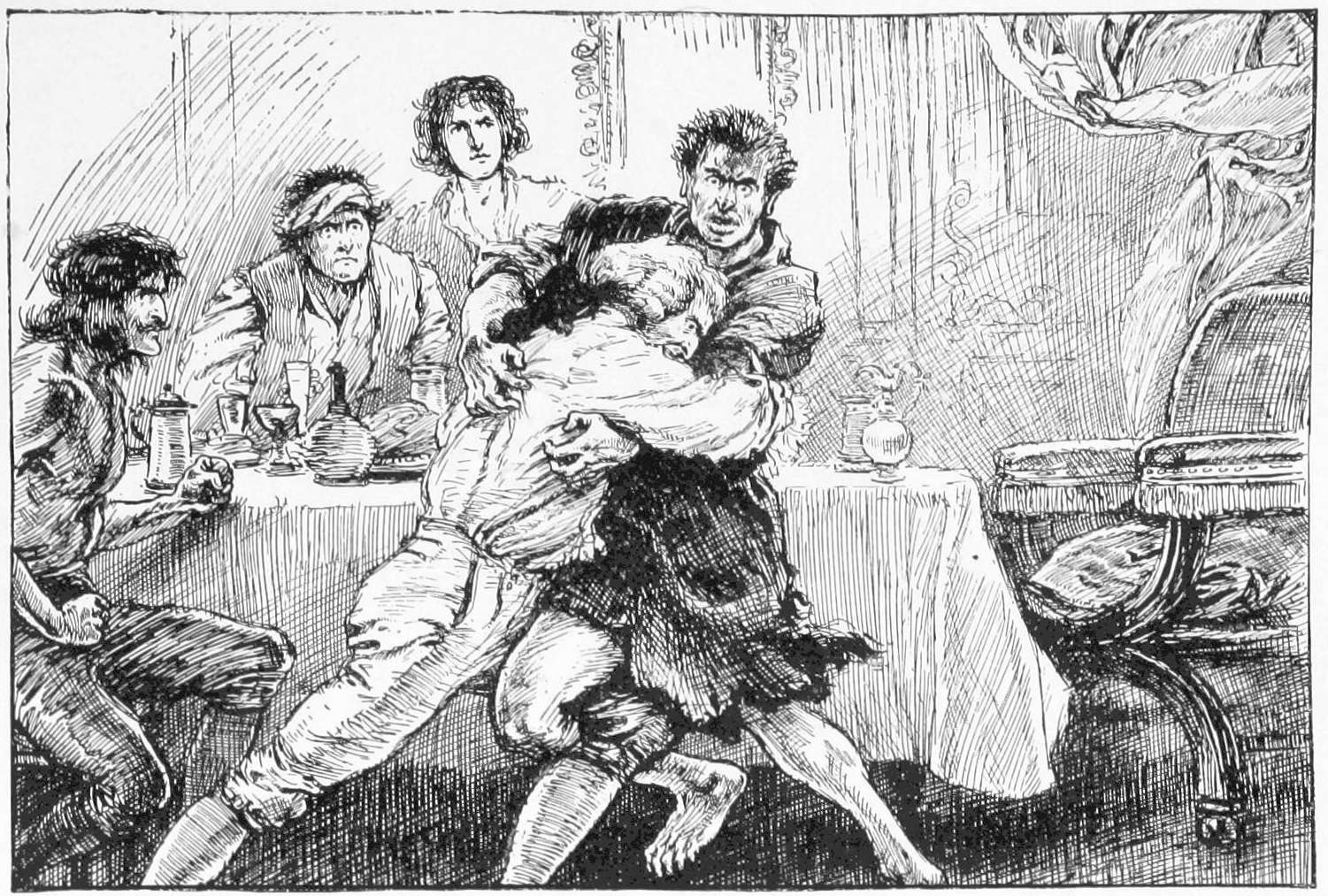
The two hurtled up and down

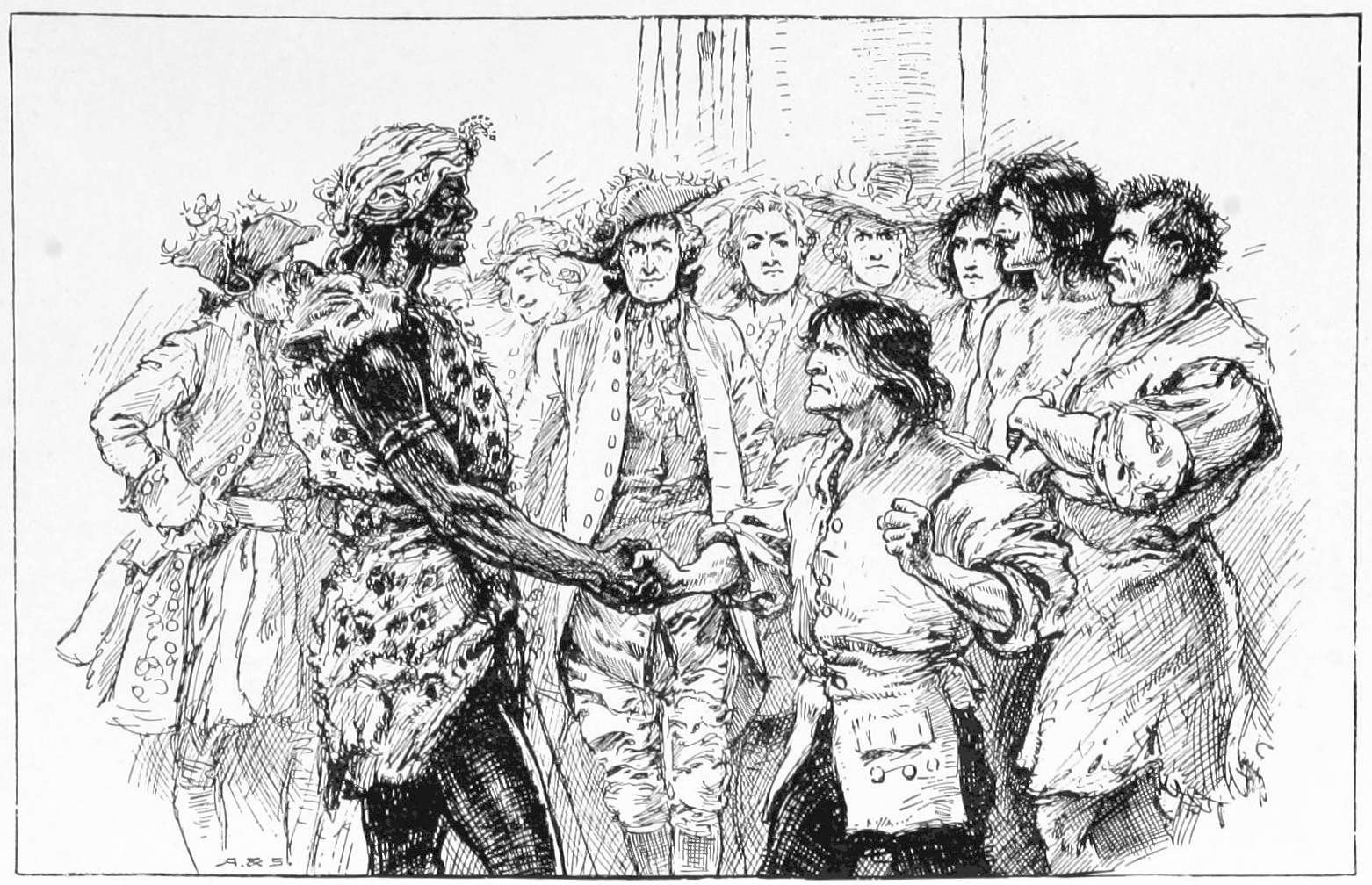
He wore a ceaseless grin

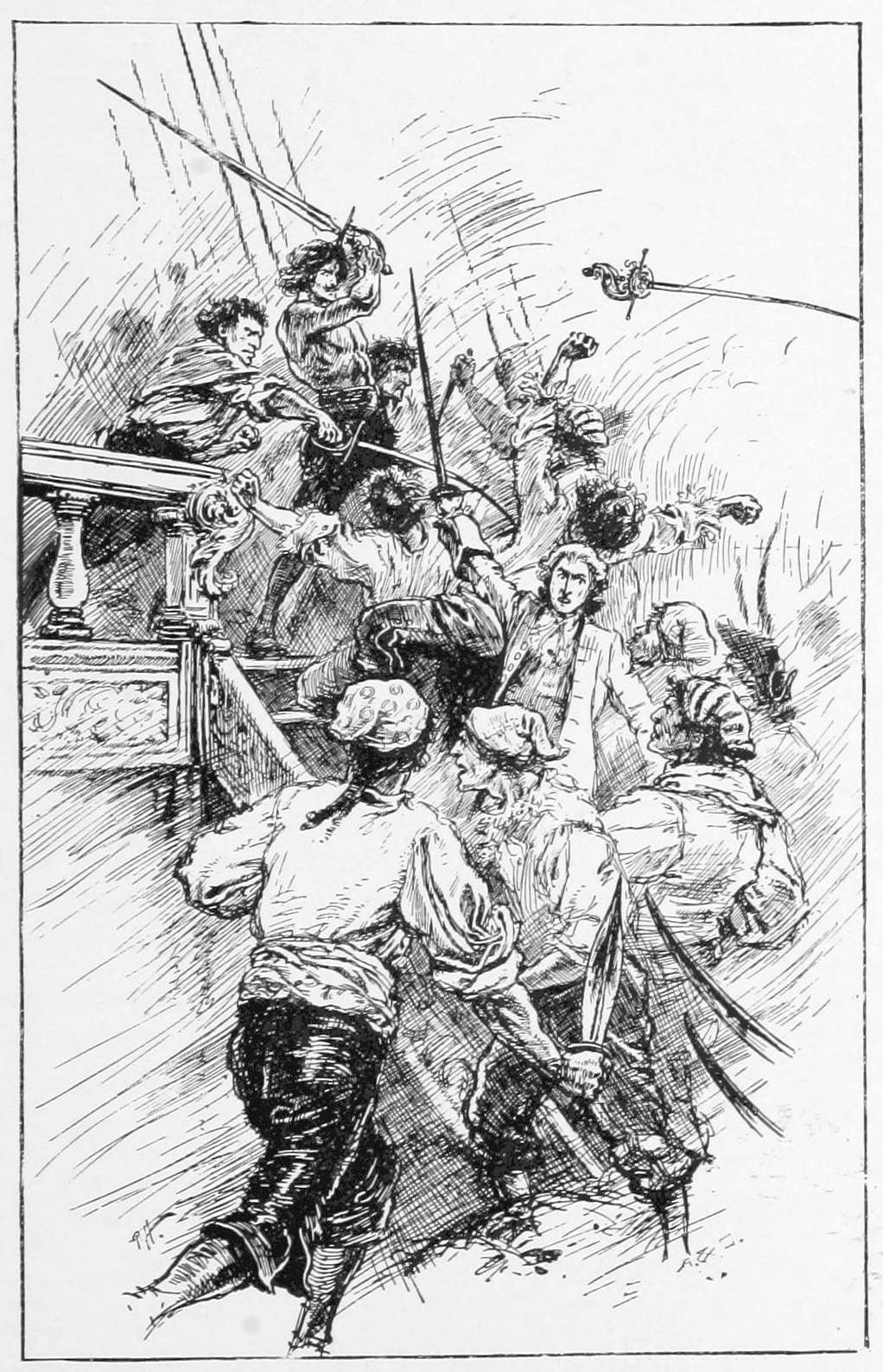
They burst up the stairs

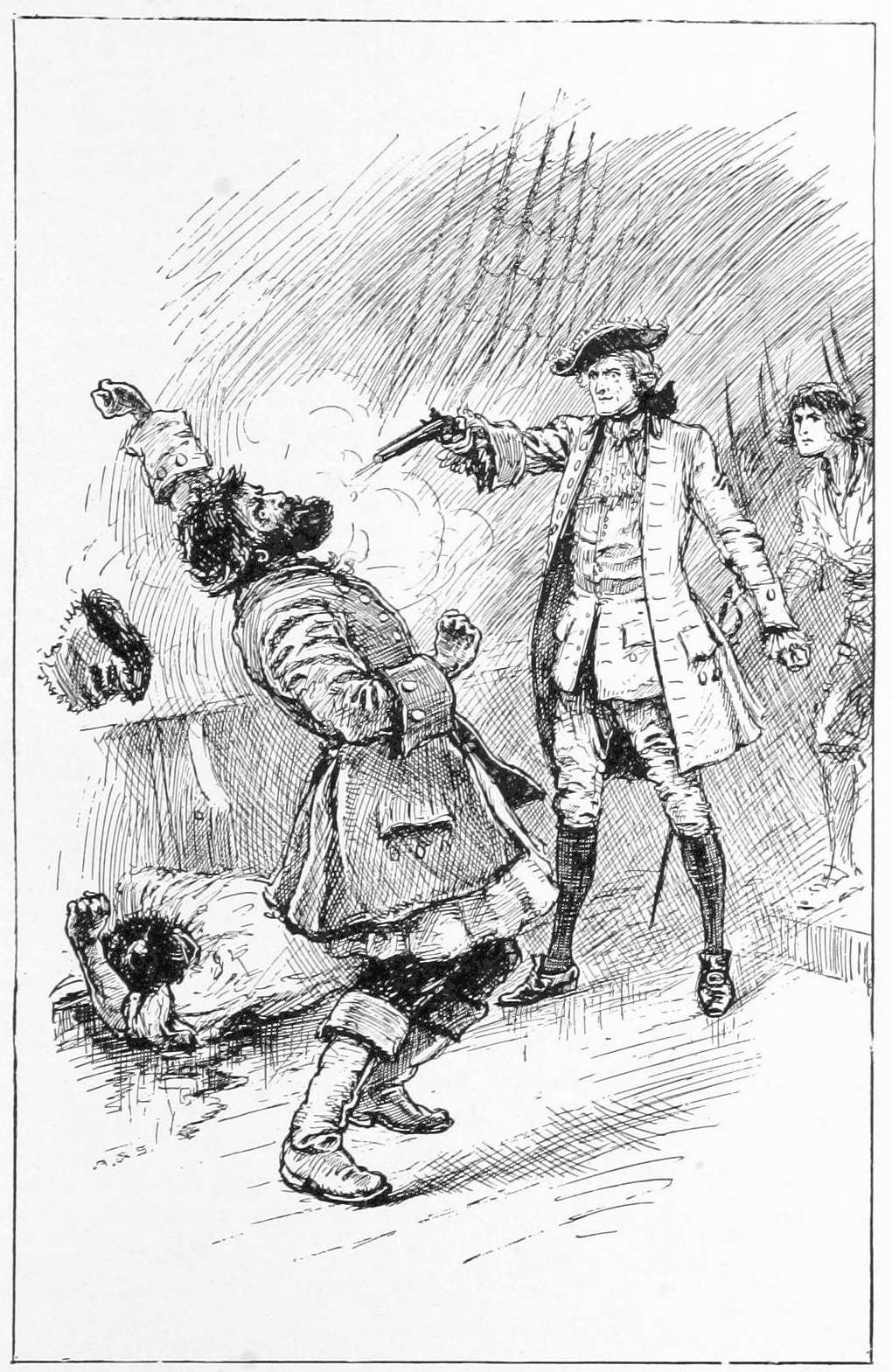
He drew a pistol and pulled the trigger

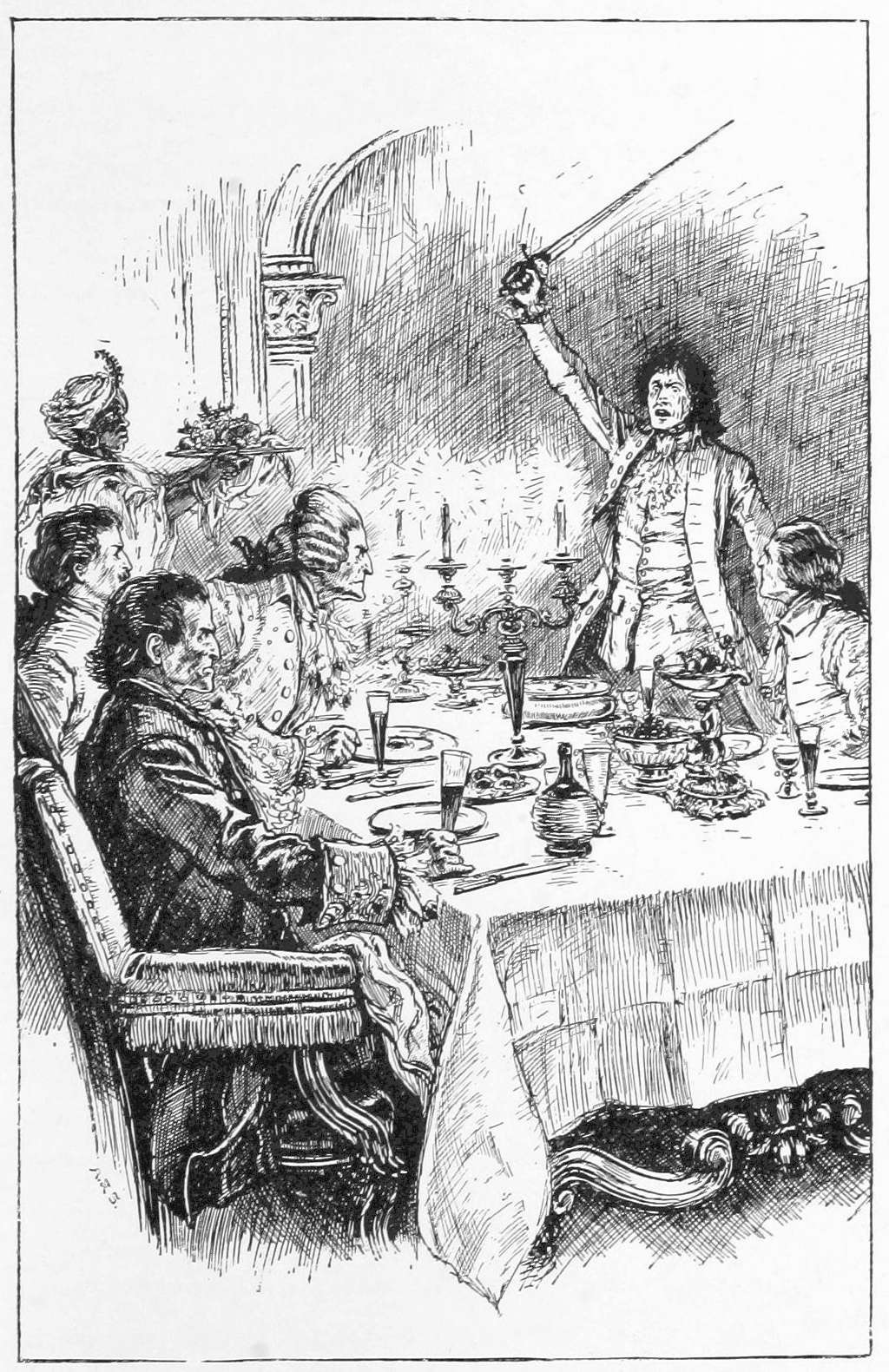
He flung his rapier round and round

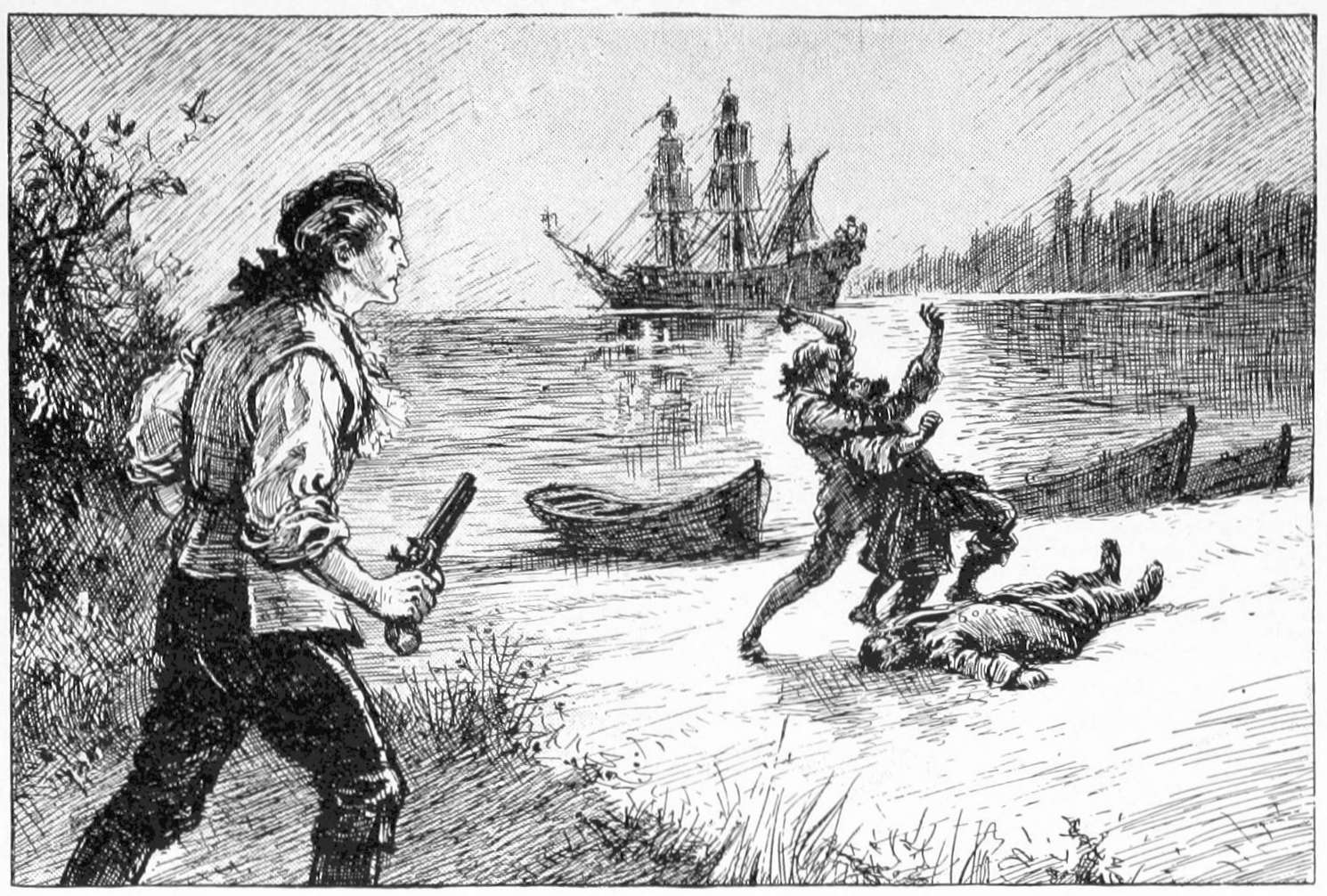
He stabbed the second man

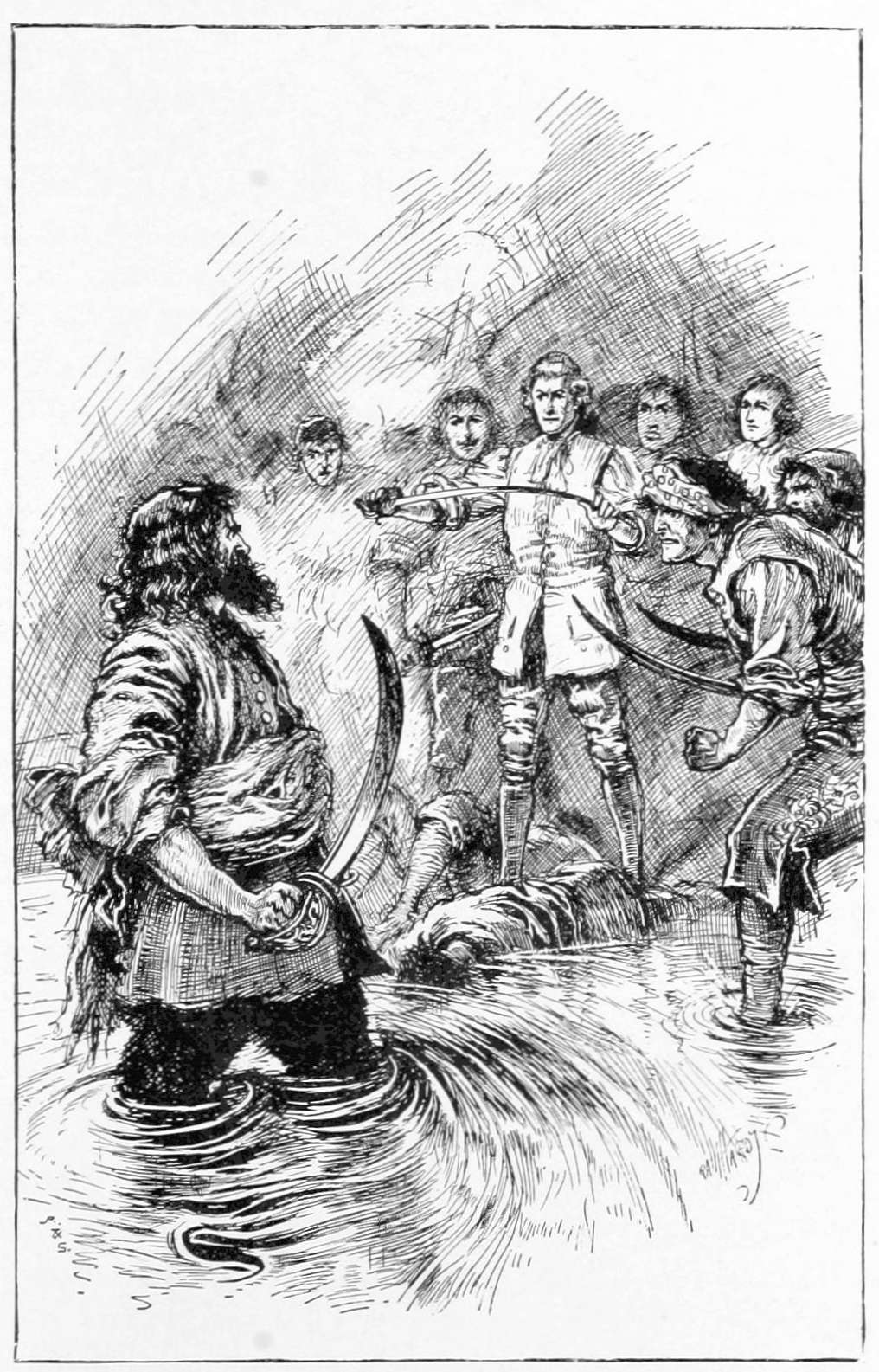
The Dutchman fought with desperate fury

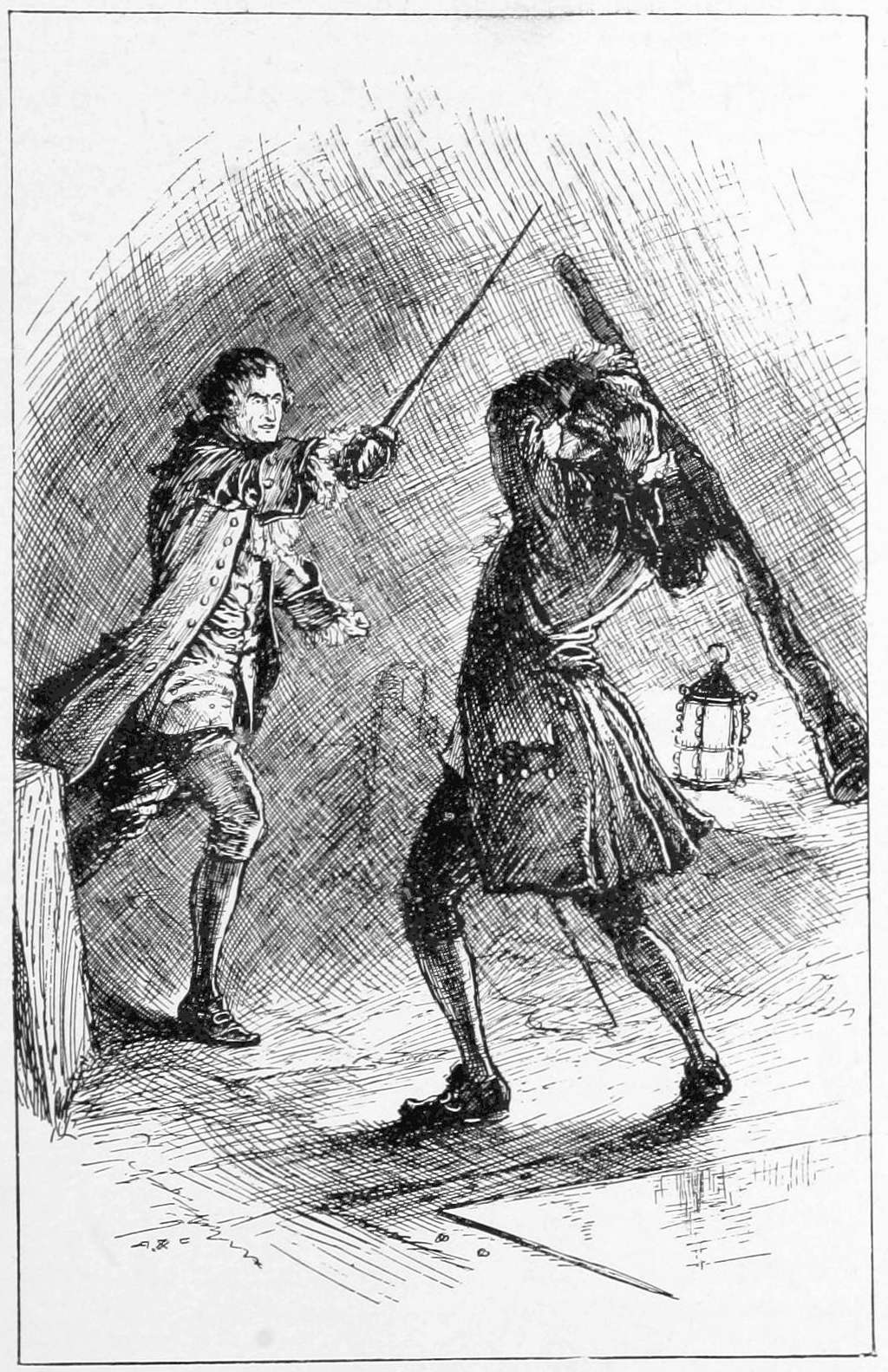
The heavy wood dropped backwards

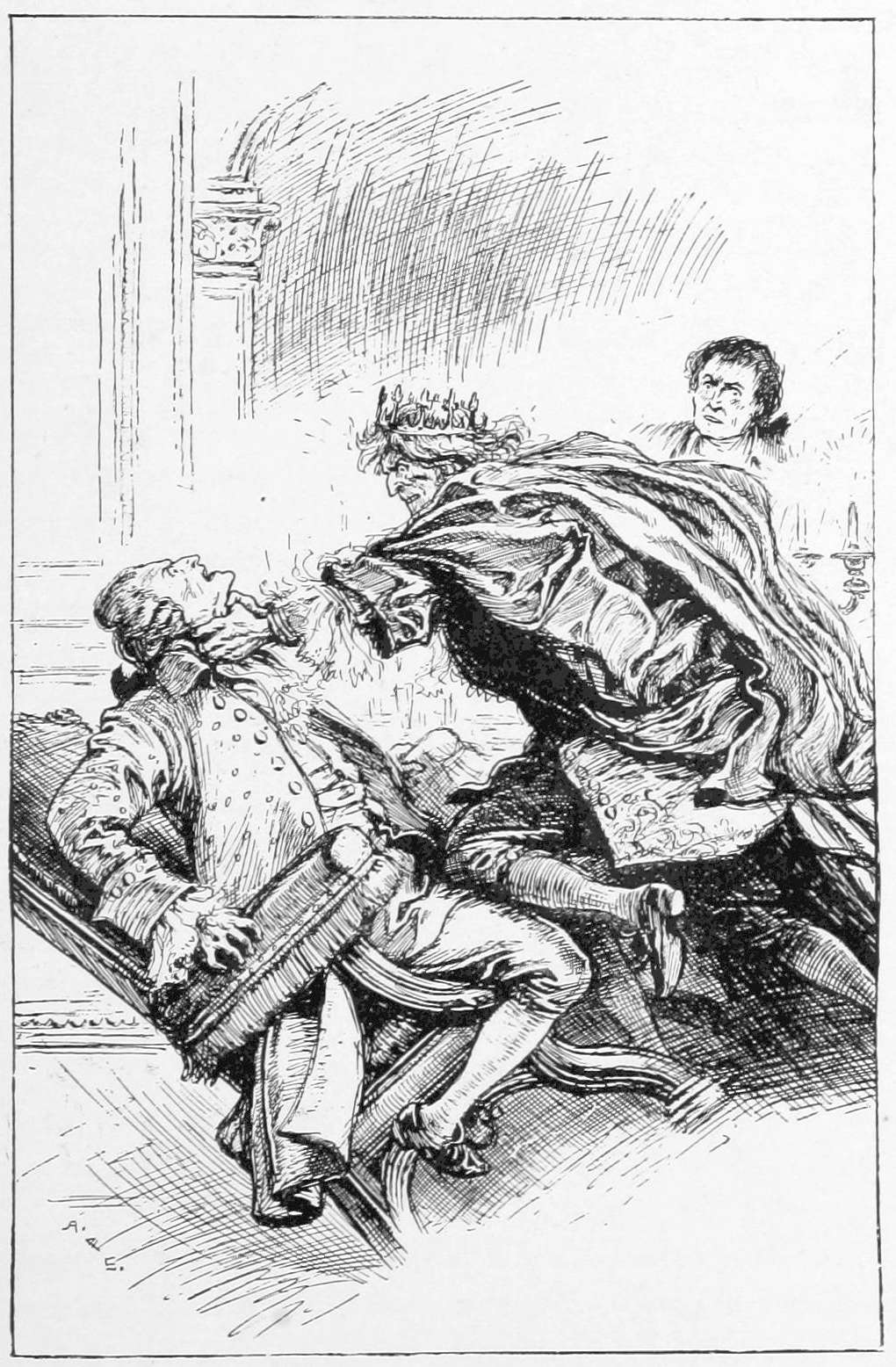
My fathers hands were tight upon his throat

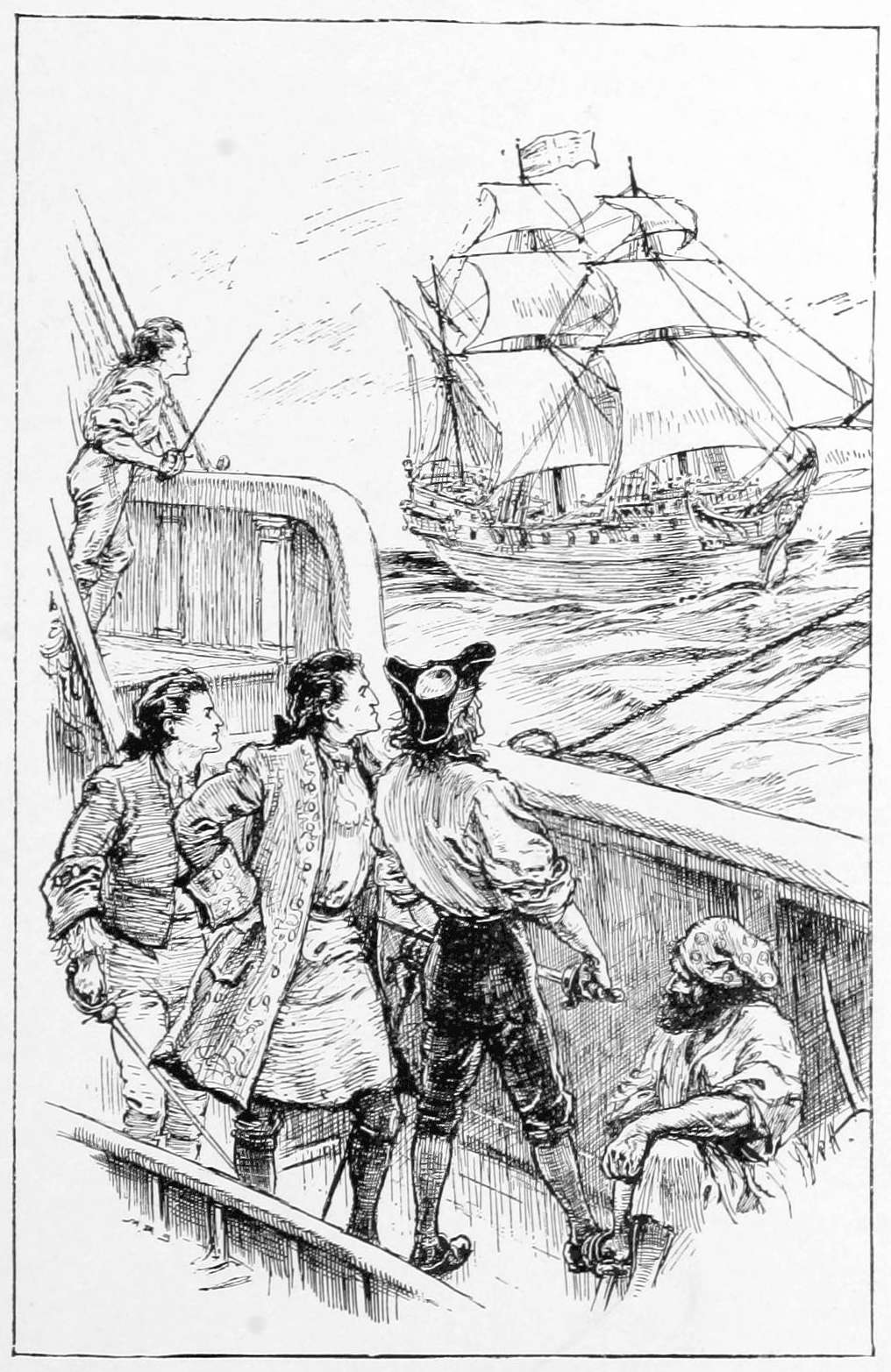
The ship came nearer and nearer

== Magazine stories ==
The following list shows Walkey's publications in Magazines from November 1907, some twelve years after his first known serial in 1895. Walkey averaged just under ten stories a year from 1908 to 1917, so a full list would probably list another one hundred stories. Most of the stories are juvenile fiction, but some of the stories are intended for an adult audience.

Stories by Walkey from November 1907 as listed in Steve Holland's British Juvenile Story Papers and Pocket Libraries Index
No	Year	Magazine	Title of Story	Type	Date (of 1st pt.)
1	1907	Chums	Trapped by the Enemy: A Story of the Indian Frontier	Short Story	20 Nov 1907
2	1908	Chums	Comrades in Peril	Serial Story	08 Jan 1908
3	1908	Chums	The Finnish Terror: A Complete Tale of Wild Peril in the Forest of Finland	Short Story	17 Jun 1908
4	1908	The Story-teller	The Shadow of the Guillotine	Novella	Jun 1908
5	1908	Chums	The Ghost of the Haunted Abbey	Short Story	08 Jul 1908
6	1908	Chums	Chased by Wolves	Short Story	12 Aug 1908
7	1909	The Story-teller	When Terror Reigned	Short Story	Jan 1909
8	1909	The New Magazine (UK)	A Mission of Shame	Short Story	Dec 1909
9	1910	The New Magazine (UK)	The Executioner from Paris	Short Story	Feb 1910
10	1910	The Story-teller	Sir Comely's Adventure	Short Story	Aug 1910
11	1911	The Story-teller	Where Love Is Deathless	Short Story	Jan 1911
12	1911	The Story-teller	The Day of Reckoning	Novelette	Feb 1911
13	1911	The New Magazine (UK)	Sweet Rose of England	Short Story	Apr 1911
14	1911	The New Magazine (UK)	Dan of the Irish Brigade	Short Story	Sep 1911
15	1911	Chums	The Lion of Koom-Panda	Short Story	25 Oct 1911
16	1911	The New Magazine (UK)	The Enemy in the House	Short Story	Oct 1911
17	1911	Chums	Hurrah! For Merry Sherwood	Serial Story	08 Nov 1911
18	1912	Cassell's Magazine of Fiction	The Land of His Fathers	Short Story	Apr 1912
19	1912	Chums	Hugo the Terrible	Short Story	18 May 1912
20	1912	Chums	The Sea-Dogs of England	Short Story	01 Jun 1912
21	1912	Chums	The Mystery Men of the Reign of Terror	Short Story	08 Jun 1912
22	1912	Chums	On the War-Trail	Novelette	08 Jun 1912
23	1912	Cassell's Magazine of Fiction	All the World Loves a Lover	Novella	Jun 1912
24	1912	The New Magazine (UK)	The Outcast	Novelette	Aug 1912
25	1912	Chums	The Bloodhounds of Spain	Short Story	14 Sep 1912
26	1912	Chums	When the Redskins Were Out	Short Story	19 Oct 1912
27	1912	Chums	One of Nelson's Heroes	Short Story	26 Oct 1912
28	1912	Cassell's Magazine of Fiction	Thadee and Clon of the Irish Brigade	Short Story	Oct 1912
29	1913	Chums	Crossbones Island	Serial Story	04 Jan 1913
30	1913	Cassell's Magazine of Fiction	The Last of Her Race	Short Story	May 1913
31	1913	Chums	Marooned on Drowned Island	Short Story	21 Jun 1913
32	1913	The New Magazine (UK)	Blood Money	Short Story	Aug 1913
33	1913	Chums	The Two Jack-a-Lanterns	Short Story	13 Sep 1913
34	1913	Chums	The Adventure of the Chateau Noir	Short Story	20 Sep 1913
35	1913	Chums	A Night of Peril	Short Story	27 Sep 1913
36	1913	Chums	The Fight in the Snow	Short Story	04 Oct 1913
37	1913	Chums	The Traitor Aristocrat	Short Story	11 Oct 1913
38	1913	Chums	An Adventure with Captain Barleycorn	Short Story	18 Oct 1913
39	1913	The Story-teller	The Great Adventure	Novella	Oct 1913
40	1913	Chums	Exiles in Peril	Short Story	13 Dec 1913
41	1913	The Story-teller	The Prisoner of War	Short Story	Dec 1913
42	1914	Chums	The War-Whoop of the Redskins	Serial Story	21 Mar 1914
43	1914	The Story-teller	The Firebrand of La Vendée	Short Story	Aug 1914
44	1914	Chums	Captain Swing	Serial Story	12 Sep 1914
45	1915	Cassell's Magazine of Fiction	The Red Dawn	Short Story	Apr 1915
46	1915	Chums	A Blow for Britain	Short Story	1 May 1915
47	1915	Chums	For Drake and Merrie England	Serial Story	19 Jun 1915
48	1915	Chums	The Spanish Pirate	Short Story	28 Aug 1915
49	1915	The New Magazine (UK)	The Honour of Benbow Brooke	Short Story	Aug 1915
50	1916	Chums	In Quest of a Kingdom	Serial Story	15 Jan 1916
51	1916	The Story-teller	Where the Heart Leads	Novella	Jan 1916
52	1916	The New Magazine (UK)	The Little Methodist	Short Story	Feb 1916
53	1916	Chums	Rimington's Bungalow	Short Story	29 Apr 1916
54	1916	Chums	On the Trail of the Head-Hunters	Short Story	6 May 1916
55	1916	Chums	The Dwarfs of the Enchanted Mountains	Short Story	13 May 1916
56	1916	Chums	The Ape-Men of the Pool	Short Story	20 May 1916
57	1916	Chums	Hoist with His Own Petard	Short Story	27 May 1916
58	1916	Chums	A Great Adventure	Short Story	03 Jun 1916
59	1916	Chums	Under the Black Flag	Serial Story	16 Sep 1916
60	1917	Chums	The Fugitives	Short Story	24 Feb 1917
61	1917	The Story-teller	The House of Ghosts	Short Story	Feb 1917
62	1917	The New Magazine (UK)	The Sword of Mahomet	Short Story	May 1917
63	1917	Chums	The Secret of the Cordillera	Short Story	16 Jun 1917
64	1917	Chums	The Ravine of Death!	Short Story	23 Jun 1917
65	1917	Chums	The Giant Sloth	Short Story	30 Jun 1917
66	1917	Chums	Wild Riders of the Plains	Short Story	07 Jul 1917
67	1917	Chums	Trapped in a Lost City!	Short Story	14 Jul 1917
68	1917	Chums	The Temple of Mystery and Terror	Short Story	21 Jul 1917
69	1917	Chums	Spanish Reef	Short Story	20 Oct 1917
70	1917	Chums	Christmas Chivalry	Short Story	08 Dec 1917
71	1918	Chums	When the Guillotine Reigned	Serial Story	12 Jan 1918
72	1918	Chums	Dead Men Tell No Tales	Short Story	27 Apr 1918
73	1918	Chums	The Pirates of Skeleton Island	Serial Story	20 Jul 1918
74	1918	Chums	On the Trail of the Master-Spy	Short Story	14 Sep 1918
75	1918	Chums	The Chateau of Mystery	Short Story	21 Sep 1918
76	1918	Chums	Traitors and Wolves	Short Story	28 Sep 1918
77	1918	Chums	Forty Thieves	Short Story	05 Oct 1918
78	1918	Chums	The Death Knell!	Short Story	12 Oct 1918
79	1918	Chums	A Duel to the Death	Short Story	19 Oct 1918
80	1918	The New Magazine (UK)	In the Cloisters	Short Story	Oct 1918
81	1918	The New Magazine (UK)	The Rat	Novella	Nov 1918
82	1919	Chums	The Pearl Stealers	Short Story	04 Jan 1919
83	1919	Chums	On the Trail of the Sea Wolf	Short Story	25 Jan 1919
84	1919	Chums	King of the Outlaws	Serial Story	08 Mar 1919
85	1919	Chums	Phantom Jack	Serial Story	31 May 1919
86	1920	Chums	The Night Rovers	Serial Story	24 Jan 1920
87	1920	Chums	The Queen's Champion	Novelette	15 May 1920
88	1920	Chums	Sea Kings and Sea Wolves	Serial Story	18 Sep 1920
89	1921	Chums	Nearly Guillotined!	Short Story	13 Aug 1921
90	1921	Chums	The Adventures of Jack-a-Lantern	Serial Story	17 Sep 1921
91	1921	Cassell's Magazine of Fiction	Pendragon of Pendragon	Short Story	Nov 1921
92	1921	The New Magazine (UK)	The Keys of Heaven	Short Story	Dec 1921
93	1922	Chums	Redskins on the War-Trail	Short Story	18 Mar 1922
94	1922	Cassell's Magazine of Fiction	The Wolf	Novelette	Mar 1922
95	1922	Chums	Dead Men's Cave	Short Story	29 Apr 1922
96	1922	Chums	The Pirates of Cathay	Short Story	22 Jul 1922
97	1922	The New Magazine (UK)	Wild Justice	Novelette	Jul 1922
98	1922	Chums	When the Vikings Came	Serial Story	16 Sep 1922
99	1922	The Corner Magazine	Thirty Pieces of Silver	Short Story	Oct 1922
100	1923	Chums	Island of Flames	Short Story	13 Jan 1923
101	1923	Chums	The Ghost Tower	Short Story	19 May 1923
102	1923	Chums	The White Shark	Short Story	28 Jul 1923
103	1923	Chums	Captives in El Dorado	Serial Story	15 Sep 1923
104	1923	Chums	The Night Riders	Short Story	29 Dec 1923
105	1924	Chums	Kidnapped and Marooned	Serial Story	22 Mar 1924
106	1924	Chums	Sea-Wolves of the Main	Short Story	02 Aug 1924
107	1924	Chums	The Sword of Tallifer Trueblade	Serial Story	14 Sep 1924
108	1924	Chums	The Robber Baron	Short Story	28 Dec 1924
109	1925	Chums	Flame-Beard's Treasure	Serial Story	08 Mar 1925
110	1925	Chums	The Bloodhound from Paris	Short Story	07 Jun 1925
111	1925	Chums	Dungeon and Rack	Short Story	06 Sep 1925
112	1926	Chums	Powder-Monkey Jack	Serial Story	14 Feb 1926
113	1926	Chums	Pirate Sink-or-Burn	Short Story	12 Sep 1926
114	1927	Chums	Marooned	Short Story	30 Jan 1927
115	1927	The Story-teller	The Secret Château	Short Story	Mar 1927
116	1927	The New Magazine (UK)	The Angel of the Prison	Short Story	May 1927
117	1928	Chums	The Return of “Jack-a-Lantern”	Short Story	08 Mar 1928
118	1928	Chums	The Night of the Swords	Short Story	15 Mar 1928
119	1928	Chums	The Lost Ones of the Lonely Chateau	Short Story	22 Mar 1928
120	1928	Chums	The Vengeance of the Blue Light	Short Story	29 Mar 1928
121	1928	Chums	The Executioner from Rouen	Short Story	05 Apr 1928
122	1928	Chums	The Outwitting of the Bloodhound	Short Story	12 Apr 1928
123	1928	Chums	The Secret Castle	Short Story	19 Apr 1928
124	1928	Chums	To Rescue the King	Short Story	26 Apr 1928
125	1928	Aldine Adventure Library	The Pirates of El Dorado	Novel	#16 1928
126	1929	The Story-teller	The Raven	Short Story	Apr 1929
127	1929	Cassell's Magazine	The Dancer and the Guillotine	Short Story	May 1929
128	1929	The Story-teller	The Lonely Inn	Short Story	Oct 1929
129	1929	Chums	Rogues of the “Roaring Glory”	Serial Story	03 Dec 1929
130	1930	The New Magazine (UK)	Red Dawn	Short Story	Apr 1930
131	1931	Chums	Drake Goes West!	Serial Story	27 Oct 1931
132	1934	Chums	Nelson's Peril	Short Story	19 Jul 1934
133	1935	Chums	Near the Shadow of the Guillotine	Short Story	19 Feb 1935
134	1935	Chums	Bowmen of Sherwood	Short Story	19 Apr 1935
135	1935	Chums	Redskins on the War Trail!	Short Story	19 Jun 1935
136	1935	Chums	Marooned on Rover Island	Short Story	19 Jul 1935
137	1936	Chums Annual	Captain Crossbones’ Treasure	Short Story	1937 Annual
138	1936	Chums Annual	The Decoy Ship	Short Story	1938 Annual
139	1936	Chums Annual	In Quest of Black Solomon	Short Story	1939 Annual
140	1936	Chums Annual	Red Falcon's Last Fight	Short Story	1940 Annual
141	1936	Chums Annual	The Three Sea Wolves	Short Story	1941 Annual
142	1936	Chums Annual	Three Skulls Island	Short Story	1942 Annual
143	1939	Chums Annual	The Treasure of Pirates’ Island	Novella	1943 Annual

== Later life ==
Walkey's promotions at Lloyds had taken him from the West Country, but he returned there when he retired, settling at Westcliffe Road in Dawlish, Devonshire, England. Kathleen died first, on 15 June 1949. Walkey himself followed four years later, dying on 29 March 1953 in Teignmouth, Devonshire.

== Assessment ==
Turner states that Chums was chiefly remembered (when he was writing in 1948) for the pirate stories of Walkey and others. He notes that Walkey contributed his fast-moving tales of villainy for more than thirty years. Cullingford noted that writers like Walkey had a large and devoted following. The Cornishman noted that his stories were read with zest by the boys of England.

Thomas told how on a visit to a boarding school, he had asked the boys if they had ever heard of Walkey; A shout went up – "Rather!". Thomas said that his own reputation was increased merely because he could tell boys a little bit about Walkey. Perhaps Walkey is best assessed by his impact. Geoffrey Trease wrote that Walkey's Hurrah for Merry Sherwood! was his favourite story, and that it was therefore not surprising that the first boys' story he wrote was Bows against the Barons (1934). Trease's boyhood impression of the French Revolution were all gained from a Walkey story about the reign of terror. He re-read the story and concluded that Walkey wrote quite well. In a tongue-in-cheek review of Yo Ho! for the Spanish Main, Herbert advised boys not to buy the book as it would take away their appetite for cube root and the least common denominator and the pluperfect tense. He maintained that Mr. Walkey and his publisher were not sedate enough companions for the young not a sedate enough companion for the young.
