= Hutchison =

Hutchison may refer to:

== Places in the United States ==
- Hutchison, Kentucky
- Hutchison, Missouri
- Hutchison, Virginia

== People ==
- Hutchison (surname)

== Other uses ==
- Hutchison School, Memphis, Tennessee
- Hutchison Whampoa, a company based in Hong Kong, now part of CK Hutchison Holdings
  - Hutchison Telecommunications International Limited, or known as "Hutchison Telecom", a telecommunications services provider and a subsidiary of CK Hutchison Holdings
  - Hutchison Ports

== See also ==
- Hutch (disambiguation)
- Hutcherson
- Hutcheson
- Hutchinson (disambiguation)
