= John Hely-Hutchinson =

John Hely-Hutchinson may refer to:

- John Hely-Hutchinson (statesman) (1724–1794), Irish lawyer, statesman, and Provost of Trinity College, Dublin,
- John Hely-Hutchinson, 2nd Earl of Donoughmore (1757–1832), Anglo-Irish politician, hereditary peer and soldier.
- John Hely-Hutchinson, 3rd Earl of Donoughmore (1787–1851), Irish politician and peer
- John Hely-Hutchinson, 5th Earl of Donoughmore (1848–1900)
- John Hely-Hutchinson, 7th Earl of Donoughmore (1902–1981), British politician
