= Hutchinson Encyclopedia =

English-language general encyclopedia

- Cover of the 1964 edition
- Editor: Adrienne
- Language: English
- Publication place: US

The Hutchinson Encyclopedia is an English-language general encyclopedia. It is a single volume designed for use in the home, libraries and schools. It attempts to be readable by reducing the use of technical language. A small subset of the Encyclopaedia is available for free but full access requires a subscription.

== Edition history ==
- First edition (as Hutchinson's Twentieth Century Encyclopedia. London: Hutchinson. OCLC 635239916.) 1948
- Second edition 1951
- Third edition 1956
- Fourth edition (as Hutchinson's new 20th Century Encyclopedia) 1964
- Fifth edition 1970
- Sixth edition (as The new Hutchinson 20th Century Encyclopedia) 1977
- Seventh edition 1981
- Eighth edition (as The Hutchinson Encyclopedia) 1988 - with 25,000 articles and 2,350 illustrations.
- Ninth edition 1990
- Tenth edition 1994
- Eleventh edition 1997

There have also been editions in 2000

There are several other editions about specific subjects

== See also ==
- List of online encyclopedias
