= Peter Hutchinson =

Peter Hutchinson may refer to:

- Peter Hutchinson (politician) (born 1949), American politician
- Peter Hutchinson (artist) (1930–2025), British-born American artist, part of the Land Art movement
- Peter Orlando Hutchinson (1810–1897), English historian, diarist and artist

== See also ==
- Peter Hutchison (1935–2019), British public official, businessman and botanist
