= Jennelle V. Moorhead =

American educator (1903–1999)

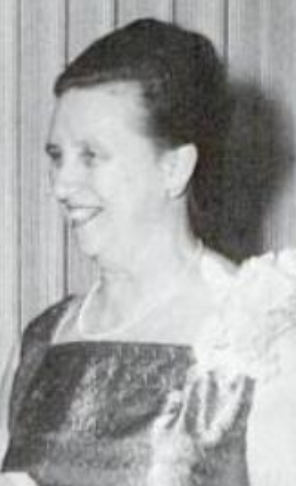
- Moorhead in a 1966 publication
- Born: Jennelle Frances Vandevort; July 13, 1903; Salem, Oregon, U.S.
- Died: January 31, 1999 (aged 95); Yuma, Arizona, U.S.
- Occupation: Educator

Jennelle Frances Vandevort Moorhead (July 13, 1903 – January 31, 1999) was an American educator and clubwoman. From 1943 to 1946, she was president of the Oregon Federation of Women's Clubs. From 1964 to 1967, she was president of the National Congress of Parents and Teachers.

== Early life and education ==
Vandevort was born in Salem, Oregon, the daughter of Henry Heaton Vandevort and Emma Vanfleet Vandevort. She graduated from Willamette University in 1925. During college, she helped to run a YWCA summer camp for girls, and represented student YWCA chapters in the Pacific Northwest at a national meeting in New York City in 1924. She earned a master's degree from the University of Oregon in 1948.

== Career ==
Moorhead was a professor of health education at the University of Oregon. She was also director of health education for the Marion County Department of Health. She was a fellow of the American Public Health Association and the American School Health Association. She was active in the American Association of University Women (AAUW) and the Oregon Mental Hygiene Association.

In 1935, Moorhead was president of the Salem Woman's Club. From 1943 to 1946, she was president of the Oregon Federation of Women's Clubs. In the 1950s she was president of the Oregon Congress of Parents and Teachers. She served on the United States' commission for UNESCO from 1957 to 1962, and on the U.S. Surgeon General's task force on cigarette smoking. She was a member of the advisory council to the National Institute of Allergy and Infectious Diseases. She made a four-month study tour of Asian countries in 1956, with particular interest in children's health education. In 1960, she led a tour group to Scandinavia and the Soviet Union, to study education programs. She led at least four study tours to West Africa.

From 1964 to 1967, Moorhead was president of the National Congress of Parents and Teachers (now known as the National PTA). In 1966, she addressed the National Education Association annual convention on the topic of "Danger from the Far Right", after attempts by the John Birch Society to take over PTA meetings and harass its leaders. Also in 1966, she received a Scroll of Appreciation from Dean Rusk, U.S. Secretary of State, for her work on behalf of international education.

== Publications ==
- "P-TA Action on the Sex Deviate Problem" (1952)
- "Food for Thought: School Health Education around the World" (1956)
- "Danger from the Far Right" (1966, pamphlet)

== Personal life ==
Vandevort married industrial chemist George Roy Kelsay Moorhead in 1926. They had two sons, George Van and Bruce. Her husband died in 1987, and she died in 1999, at the age of 95, in Yuma, Arizona.
