= April Hutchinson =

Canadian Powerlifter and Activist (born 1976)

April-Lea Christina Hutchinson
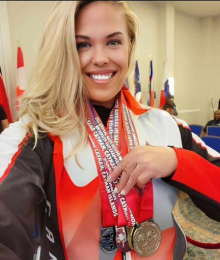

Personal information
- National team: Team Canada
- Born: April 30, 1976 (age 50) Toronto, Ontario
- Height: 5 ft 11 in (180 cm)
- Spouse: Chad Yeo
- Website: https://www.aprilhutchinson.com

Sport
- Sport: Powerlifting
Medal record
Women's powerlifting
Representing Canada
North American Regional Powerlifting Championships
Gold medal – first place	2022 Panama	Masters 1
Silver medal – second place	2023 Cayman Islands	Masters 1
Nationals
Gold medal – first place	2022 Newfoundland	Masters 1
Silver medal – second place	2023 British Columbia	Masters 1
Central Canadian Powerlifting and Bench Press Championships
Gold medal – first place	2021 Ontario	Masters 1
Ontario Provincials
Gold medal – first place	2022 Ontario	Open
OPA Masters and Open Provincial Powerlifting Championship
Gold medal – first place	2023 Ontario	Masters 1

April-Lea Christina Hutchinson, also known as April Hutchinson, (born April 30, 1976) is a Canadian competitive powerlifter from London, Ontario. She is a three-time former Team Canada member and the current Women's North American Powerlifting Federation's M1 84 kg+ deadlift record holder.

== Early life ==
Hutchinson was born in Toronto, ON, and moved to London, ON, at the age of 5. Her grandfather was drafted by the Montreal Canadiens.

== Powerlifting ==
Hutchinson began seriously training as a powerlifter in order to improve her health after suffering from alcoholism. Once the COVID-19 pandemic started, she trained every day in a friend's garage. She first competed in the Central Canadian Powerlifting and Bench Press Championships in November 2021 where she placed first in the Masters division. In August 2022, she won 1st place Overall and established the North American deadlift record at the North American Regional Powerlifting Championships in the Masters division in Panama City, Panama. At the time she was the best women’s Masters class lifter in Canada and ranked in the top four in the world.

Hutchinson credits powerlifting as assisting her to overcome alcoholism. She was included in the "Resilient London: Meet Your Neighbours" exhibit about overcoming adversity at Museum London, Ontario.

While chatting with a woman in a Facebook powerlifting group during the COVID-19 pandemic, Hutchinson learned that the woman was transgender and was going to participate in competitive Canadian powerlifting events. Thinking this was unfair to cisgendered women, Hutchinson wrote to Canadian governing bodies for powerlifting but did not receive a response. In August 2023 after the powerlifter from the Facebook group won a competition breaking a longstanding record, Hutchinson expressed her disapproval on social media and in an interview with Piers Morgan, referring to her as a biological male. This resulted in a two year suspension by the Canadian Powerlifting Union's (CPU) which was later reduced to one year. Hutchinson was also removed from the "Resilient London" exhibit due to her vocal criticism of the CPU policy allowing athletes to participate in categories matching their gender identity.

In 2025, she spoke to a full house in an event put on by Regina Civic Action Awareness Network (RCAAN).

=== Accomplishments ===
- Holds record as an NAPF Deadlift champion in her category
- Personal best lifts include a 420 lb squat, a 209 lb bench press, and a 509 lb deadlift
- Recognition for her performance at the North American Championships, where she won the Masters Award Overall and established a record
- Five first-place, two second-place, and one fourth-place at Worlds in Newfoundland, finishes in two years of competitions
