= Gregory Hutchinson =

Gregory Hutchinson may refer to:

- Gregory Hutchinson (classicist) (born 1957), British classicist and academic
- Gregory Hutchinson (musician) (born 1970), American jazz drummer
