= John Irwin Hutchinson =

American mathematician

John Irwin Hutchinson (12 April 1867 – 1 December 1935) was an American mathematician born in Bangor, Maine. He was educated at Bates College, (A.B., 1889), Clark University (1890–92), and the University of Chicago (Ph.D., 1896). With Virgil Snyder he was coauthor of Differential and Integral Calculus (1902) and Elementary Treatise on the Calculus (1912).

== Books ==
- Differential and integral calculus (New York, American Book Company, 1902)
- Elementary textbook on the calculus. (New York, American Book Company, 1912)

== Sources ==
Obituaries

- Virgil Snyder John Irwin Hutchinson—In memoriam Bull. Amer. Math. Soc. 42, 164, (1936).
