= Hutchinson, West Virginia =

- Unincorporated community
- Location within West Virginia Location within the United States
- Coordinates: 37°49′0″N 81°54′29″W
- Country: United States
- State: West Virginia
- County: Logan
- Elevation: 902 ft (275 m)
- Time zone: UTC-5 (Eastern (EST))
  - Summer (DST): UTC-4 (EDT)
- GNIS ID: 1554760

Hutchinson is an unincorporated community in Logan County, West Virginia, United States.
