= George Wylie Hutchinson =

Canadian painter (1852–1942)

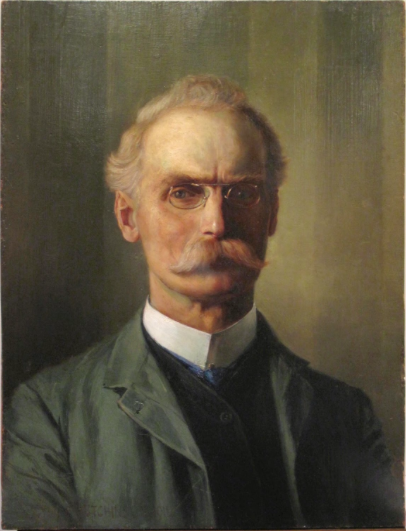
George Wylie Hutchinson - self portrait, 1920

George Wylie Hutchinson (1852–1942) was a painter and leading illustrator in Britain and was from Great Village, Nova Scotia, Canada. He illustrated the works of Arthur Conan Doyle, Rudyard Kipling, Hall Caine, Robert Louis Stevenson and Israel Zangwill. His paintings inspired the poem "Large Bad Picture" and "Poem", both by Elizabeth Bishop, his great grand niece. Hutchinson was a contributor to and subject of the novel The Master (1895) by Israel Zangwill, with whom he was a close friend.

Hutchinson left Nova Scotia at age 14, as a cabin boy. He studied painting in London at the Royal Academy (1880–1885) and later painted portraits and created illustrations and cartoons for numerous publications such as the Illustrated London News. At the age of 44, he returned to Nova Scotia for a year in 1896 and taught painting.

By the 1910s and 1920s, Hutchinson appears to have been living in retirement in Clacton-on-Sea, Essex.

== Works ==
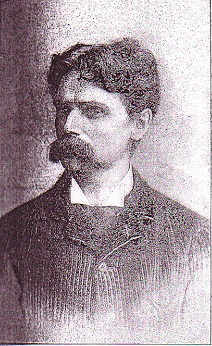
George Wylie Hutchinson, c. 1900

- Arthur Conan Doyle. Sherlock Holmes: A Study in Scarlet" (1891) .
- Arthur Conan Doyle. The Stark Munro Letters - Chapter 5. The Idler, Dec. 5, 1894
- Arthur Conan Doyle. Juvenilia. The Idler magazine. January 1893 (re-published in My First Book edited by Chatto & Windus in september 1894).
- Rudyard Kipling
- Robert Louis Stevenson.Treasure Island. Chums (paper) serialization (29 Aug 1894- 2 Jan 1895).
- Hall Caine
- Israel Zangwil. The King of Schnorrers: Grotesques and Fantasies
- · I. Zangwill. Cheating the Gallows. The Idler [v3 #13, February 1893] ed. Jerome K. Jerome & Robert Barr (Chatto & Windus; London)
- Zangwill, Israel, 1864-1926: The Bachelors' Club / by I. Zangwill; with ill. by George Hutchinson. (London : Henry, 1891)
- C. J. Cutcliffe Hyne. The Adventures of a Solicitor. London: James Bowen,. 1898.
- Jane G. Austin. Standish of Standish. 1889.
- Barry Pain. The Thirteenth Column. The Windsor Magazine [v1 #3, March 1895] ed. D. Williamson (London: Ward, Lock & Bowden, p. 254 ·
- Charles J. Mansford.Luck of the Little Garrison. The Windsor Magazine [v1 #5, May 1895] ed. D. Williamson (London: Ward, Lock & Bowden.
- Clark Russell. Drove Back. The Idler Magazine, Vol. 6, p. 687
- Thomas Nelson Page. Ile Ole Virginia. 1887.
- Henry Herman. A Woman, A mystery. A Romance of Three Revolutions. 1894.
- Henry Herman. His Angel: A romance of the far west. 1892.
- Illustrated London News.
- Samuel Walkey's serial In Quest of Sheba's Treasure, (1895-1896) volumes.
- Joseph Howe, Normal College, Nova Scotia (1896)
- Gloud Wilson McLelan (1796-1858), Nova Scotia Museum
- George R. Sims. A Story of Strawberry Court. The Ludgate Monthly [v2 #3, January 1892] ed. Philip May

=== Gallery ===
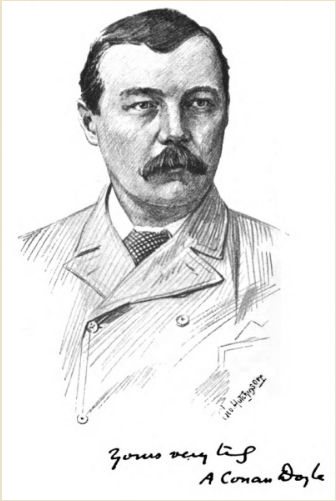
Arthur Conan Doyle

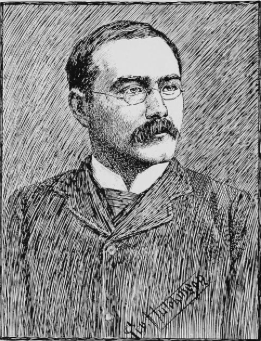
Rudyard Kipling

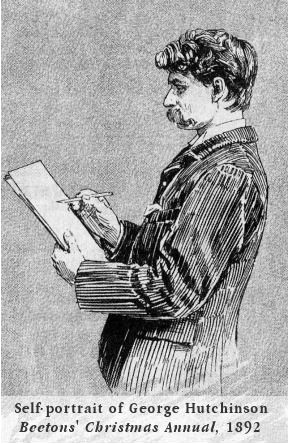
George Hutchinson - self portrait

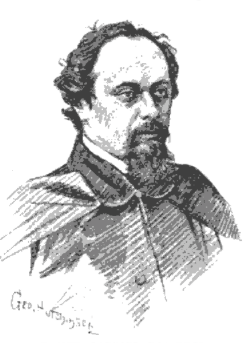
Dante Gabriel Rossetti

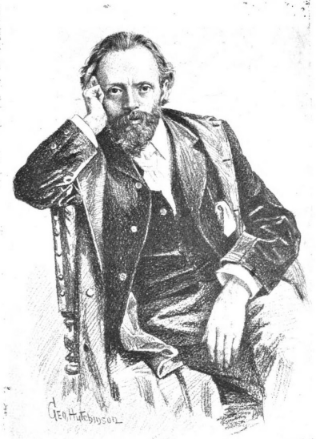
Hall Caine

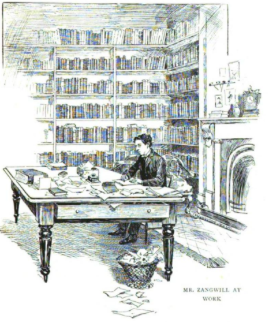
Israel Zangwill

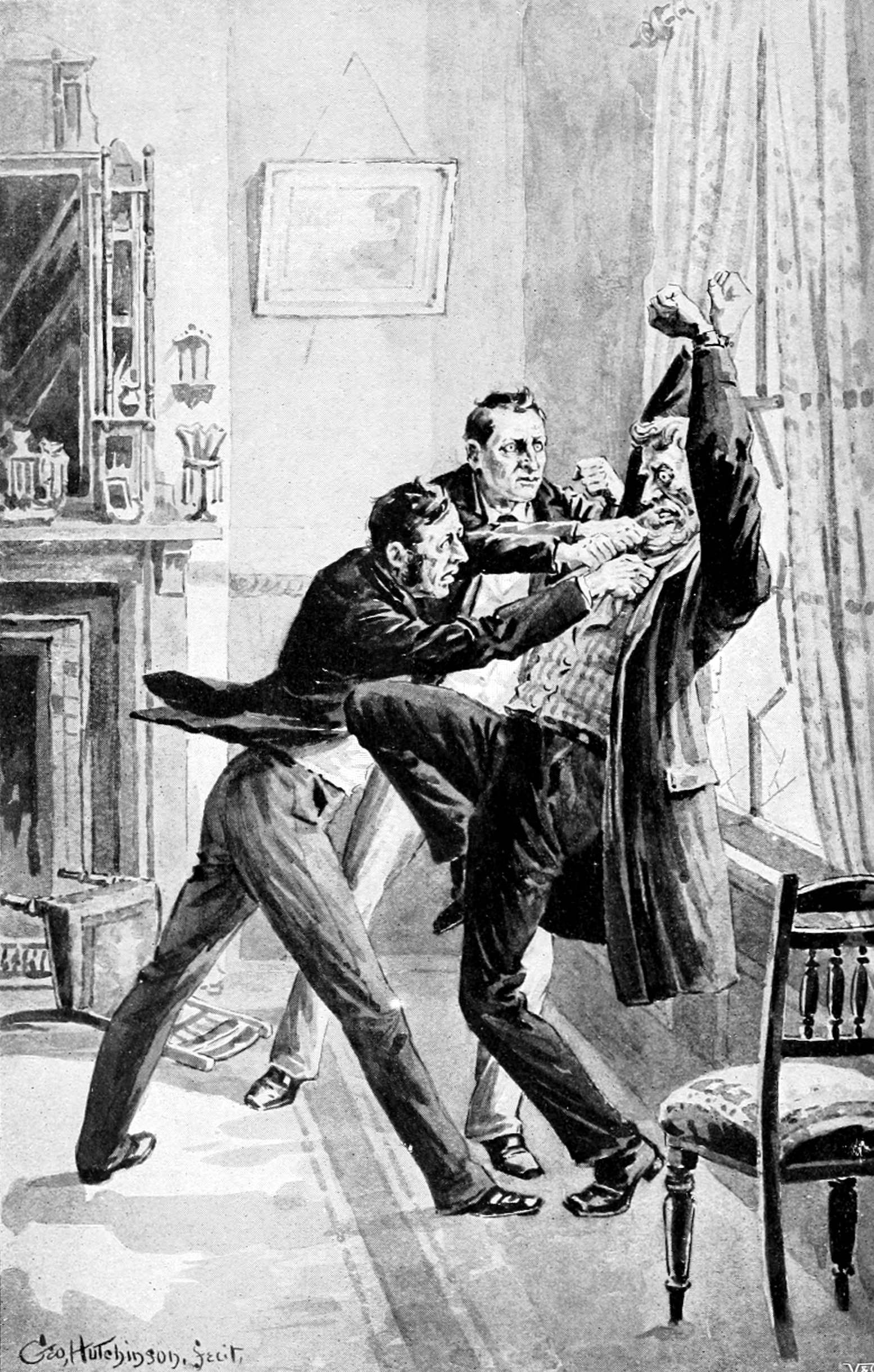
Sherlock Holmes: A Study in Scarlet (1892)

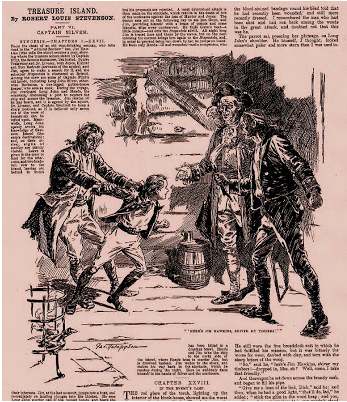
Treasure Island (1894)

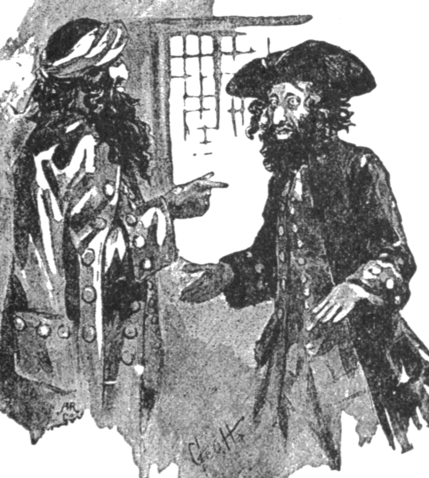
Two shnorrers (1894)
