= Edward Hutchinson =

Edward Hutchinson may refer to:

- Edward Hutchinson (mercer) (c. 1564–1632), mercer in Lincolnshire, England; father of five New England immigrants
- Edward Hutchinson, Sr. (1607–after 1669), signer of Portsmouth Compact, early Rhode Island settler
- Edward Hutchinson (captain) (1613–1675), signer of Portsmouth Compact; captain of the Massachusetts Bay Colony; died of wounds suffered during King Philip's War
- J. Edward Hutchinson (1914–1985), politician from the U.S. state of Michigan
- Edward L. Hutchinson (1864–?), attorney and a member of the Los Angeles, California, City Council
- Eddie Hutchinson (born 1982), footballer
- Edward Hutchinson (Hollyoaks), fictional character in the UK soap opera

== See also ==
- Ed Hutchinson (1867–1934), Major League Baseball player
