= Frank Hutchesson =

Australian rules footballer, born 1907

Frank Hutcheson

Personal information
- Full name: Frank Stuart (Chic) Hutcheson
- Born: 22 November 1907
- Died: 7 March 1969 (aged 61)
- Original team: Oakleigh
- Height: 174 cm (5 ft 9 in)
- Weight: 72 kg (159 lb)
- Position: Utility

Playing career^{1}
Years	Club	Games (Goals)
1927–31	St Kilda	52 (7)
- ^{1} Playing statistics correct to the end of 1931.

Frank Hutcheson (22 November 1907 – 7 March 1969) was a former Australian rules footballer who played with St Kilda in the Victorian Football League (VFL).
