= Alex Hutchinson (musician) =

Australian musician

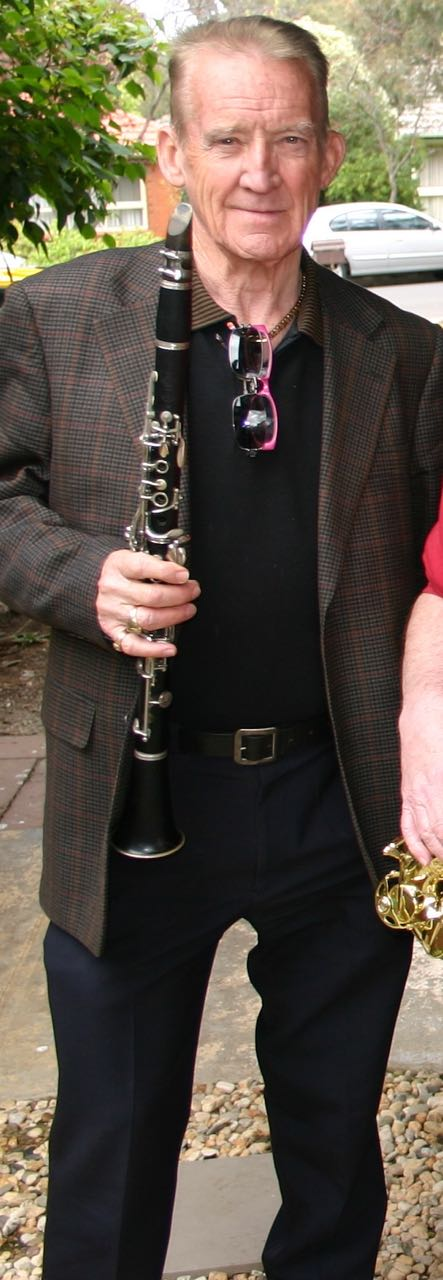
- Born: Alexander Hutchinson; 24 December 1934 (age 90); Melbourne, Victoria, Australia
- Occupation: Jazz musician

Alexander Hutchinson (born 24 December 1934) is a Melbourne-based Australian musician, who mainly plays clarinet, but also saxophone. His lifetime non-stop seventy year career extends from when he was first professionally employed as a performer at the age of fifteen in 1949 until his effective retirement in 2019.

Within the context of his main city of Melbourne and Victoria, Hutchinson enjoys an eminence based on his career, his acknowledged playing ability and his musicianship. As well as his performances, he has a long history of involvement in the Victorian Jazz Scene campaigning for improved pay and conditions for music makers. This work led to his election as President of the Musicians' Union. One of his highpoints was his membership of the Graeme Bell All Stars. In their 1955-56 tour, they were hailed as the most popular jazz band in Australia's history.

He has featured on recorded music which included LPs, 45 rpms, and CDs.

== Early years ==
Born on Christmas Eve, 1934, Alex Hutchinson became inspired, at the age of 13, by the music of Benny Goodman. As a teenager, he found that he had, as a natural instinctive talent, an ear for music. His music teacher at Moreland Central School organised his best students for a performance at the Coburg Town Hall (Melbourne, Victoria, Australia). It was the beginning of Hutchinson's career in musical performance.

Later the young Alex took lessons from Reg "Pappy" Lloyd, a clarinet player at the Tivoli Theatre, Melbourne. By the age of 15 Alex had formed a duo with pianist/greengrocer Max Sheridan. They provided the music for the Saturday Night Scout Dances in the Buffalo Hall in Victoria Street, Coburg.

== Career ==
The duo became a trio and received invitations to perform all over Victoria. Engaged at the Pacific Hotel in Lorne, Victoria, Hutchinson came to the attention of Graeme Bell, the Australian dixieland and classical jazz pianist, composer and band leader. Bell's band performed nearby at the Wild Colonial Club. Bell recognised Hutchinson's talents and welcomed him into his band for tours in 1955 and 1956 – mainly in South Australia. These tours were highly successful. Hutchinson mainly played the clarinet. He developed a high level of expertise with the alto, tenor, and baritone saxophone. In 1958 Hutchinson became part of the Ted Preston Trio with the vocalist Margaret Becker. They played six nights a week at Scotts Hotel in Collins Street in Melbourne city.

In the 1960s top-level musicians were employed for visiting celebrity performers. These included Julie London, Jimmy Rogers, Billy Eckstine, Oscar Peterson, Mickey Rooney and Brook Benton. Hutchinson was selected for these backing bands. These performances were commonly held at the Federal Hotel, the Menzies, and the Savoy Plaza. Late in the 1960s and early seventies Hutchinson was part of the Frank Gow) and Geoff Kitchen group, both spawned by Frank Johnson's Fabulous Dixielanders, the Georgia Lett quartet, Barry O'Dowd and Joan Watts and her Wicked Wattnots.

During the 1970s, 1980s and 1990s Hutchinson sustained a position in the active jazz and music life of Melbourne. He was for a time a member of Frank Traynor's Jazz Preachers (Jazz Unlimited) and was an honoured performance guest at twenty consecutive Merimbula Jazz Festivals. His own trio and quartet entertained at many venues and events including a thirteen year stint at the Savoy Park Plaza in Little Collins Street. During the 1980s and 1990s he played regularly at many jazz festivals including Montsalvat, St Valentine's and Suncoast. In 1994 he was named the winner of the Ron Foale Memorial Award for Outstanding Performance at the Merimbula NSW Jazz Festival.

Hutchinson was a feature in a number of recordings created in the 50s, 60s and 70s. These included the first recording of the VFL footy songs and an LP with Georgia Lee, considered the first indigenous Australian jazz and blues singer (1962). He recorded a CD with Gaynor Bunning.

Hutchinson has recorded four CDs of his own– The Goodman Touch, A Clarinet Love Affair, Stompin' at the Savoy (with his close friend, pianist Mickey Tucker), and The Tassie Connection (with Jack Duffy).

He retains relationships with some of the world's great musicians (some of whom he hosted during their Australian visits) including Buddy DeFranco, Oscar Peterson, Eddie Daniels and Clark Terry. In September 2012 Hutchinson was ranked as number eight in the popular jazz clarinetists of the world rankings.

== Discography ==
- The Goodman Touch
- The Tassie Connection
- Stompin' at the Savoy
- Clarinet Love Affair
