= Mark Hutchinson =

Mark Hutchinson may refer to:

- Mark Hutchinson (cricketer) (born 1978), Irish cricketer
- Mark Michael Hutchinson, American actor

== See also ==
- Mark Haigh-Hutchinson (1964–2008), English video-game developer
- Mark Hutchison (born 1963), Lieutenant Governor of Nevada
