= Jenelle Hutcherson =

Jenelle Hutcherson (born November 15, 1985) is an American hair artist, activist, public figure, designer, youth mentor and visionary. She is best known for being the first openly lesbian contestant for Miss California and the first contestant to wear a tuxedo in the Miss Long Beach 2011 pageant in Long Beach, CA, and the Miss California USA pageant in Palm Desert, CA 2012. Her participation in the pageants intended to break stereotypes of pageant participants from various angles: as a feminist, a racial minority, and as a butch woman.

Hutcherson is a part of both the LGBT community and the pageant community. She made headline news in media such as NBC, CBS, KCAL9, Huffington Post, After Ellen, The Advocate, NOH8 Campaign, Courage Campaign, GLAAD, SDGLN (San Diego Gay and Lesbian News), Curve Magazine, GreaterLongBeach.com, Press-Telegram, and Los Angeles Times. The campaign of "Vote for Jenelle" went international after AfterEllen.com published an article about Hutcherson in September 2011.

== Biography ==
Hutcherson is of Native-American, Mexican, Spanish, and Tennessean descent. She grew up in Wasco, CA, where her father and mother owned their own business. She attended grade school in the public school system and at middle school transitioned over to a private school of Christian organization.

At 10 years old her father died of AIDS contracted from a dentist's office. Shortly after his death, her mother moved both her and her brother to Bakersfield, CA. There she raised sheep and horses with her family in the local 4-H Club.

In middle school, Hutcherson was bullied for having gained weight and her clothing. In high school, at age 16 she came out as a lesbian; she had known that she was gay since she was 5 years old. Her bullying would continue in high school.

Her mother questioned her sexuality and even suggested seeing a counselor, who became a great source of support for Hutcherson. Her grandmother was a hairstylist and inspired her to go to school to earn a cosmetology license. She then assisted a stylist at Afif Hair International for four years. In beauty school, she was scrutinized by the owner for being openly gay and even was told that she would never make it as a hairstylist by one instructor.

She relocated to Long Beach in 2008 to work in downtown for The Den Salon. She was successful in building a large clientele quickly and helped to build the business alongside the salon owners, Andrew and Allison Kripp. She is now working as the Den Salon's Lead Artist.

In October 2010, while working at The Den Salon, Justin Rudd, the director of Miss Long Beach and Southern California Cities Pageant, asked Hutcherson if she would be interested in entering the Miss Long Beach pageant. Rudd and Hutcherson discussed her outfit, and decided to wait to complete until the following year.

Hutcherson is a mentor for the Mentoring Youth Through Empowerment (MYTE) program for ages 13–18 at the Center of Downtown Long.
