= John Hutcheson (footballer) =

Scottish footballer

Personal information
- Full name: John Hughes McGeavy Hutcheson
- Date of birth: 31 March 1909
- Place of birth: Larbert, Scotland
- Date of death: 10 January 1979 (aged 69)
- Place of death: Braintree, England
- Height: 5 ft 10 in (1.78 m)
- Position: Left half

Senior career*
Years	Team	Apps	(Gls)
- Preston Athletic
1927–1934	Falkirk	185	(11)
1934–1937	Chelsea	22	(0)
1938–1939	Ipswich Town	0	(0)
1939–1940	Crittall Athletic		
Total		207	(11)

International career
1933	Scottish League XI	1	(0)
- * Club domestic league appearances and goals

John Hughes McGeavy Hutcheson (31 March 1909 – 10 January 1979) was a Scottish footballer who played mainly as a left half.

He began his senior career at Falkirk where he made over 200 appearances in the Scottish Football League and Scottish Cup, and was selected for the Scottish Football League XI in March 1933, before moving on to English football with Chelsea in March 1934. He was more of a squad player than a first-team regular in his time at Stamford Bridge, but was still highly enough regarded to be selected for an unofficial international for charity between England and Scotland (the teams were selected from players based in and around London) to commemorate the silver jubilee of King George V.

He suffered a serious knee injury in 1936 which appeared to have ended his career and resulted in a compensatory payment from the Football League. However, by 1938 he was fit enough to sign for Ipswich Town, who used him in the reserves and FA Cup ties (as well as in coaching duties) but were declined permission by the league from using him in their matches due to his 'paid off' status, and the club decided not to dispute the matter further as they were newly elected members. In 1939 Hutcheson moved to non-league Crittall Athletic in Essex where the onset of World War II soon ended his career for good, however he settled in the local area.
