= Paul Hutchinson =

English footballer

Personal information
- Full name: Paul Hutchinson
- Date of birth: 20 February 1953
- Place of birth: Eaglescliffe, County Durham, England
- Position: Full back

Youth career
- –: Darlington

Senior career*
Years	Team	Apps	(Gls)
1971–1973	Darlington	10	(0)
–	Billingham Town		
- * Club domestic league appearances and goals

Paul Hutchinson (born 20 February 1953) is an English former footballer who played as a full back in the Football League for Darlington.

Hutchinson was born in Eaglescliffe, County Durham. He began his football career as a junior with Darlington, and made his senior debut on 23 October 1971, as a substitute for Colin Sinclair in a 3–0 defeat away to Aldershot in the Fourth Division. He made nine more appearances, all in the league in 1972–73, before moving into non-league football with Billingham Town.
