= Chesser =

Chesser may refer to

- Chesser, Edinburgh
- Chesser Island

== Surname ==
- Al H. Chesser
- Billy Chesser
- Chris Chesser
- Elizabeth Chesser
- Eustace Chesser
- George Chesser
- John Chesser (disambiguation), several people
- Wendy Dant Chesser
- Zachary Adam Chesser
