= Robert Inches =

Scottish goldsmith and silversmith (c. 1845 – 1918)

Sir Robert Inches
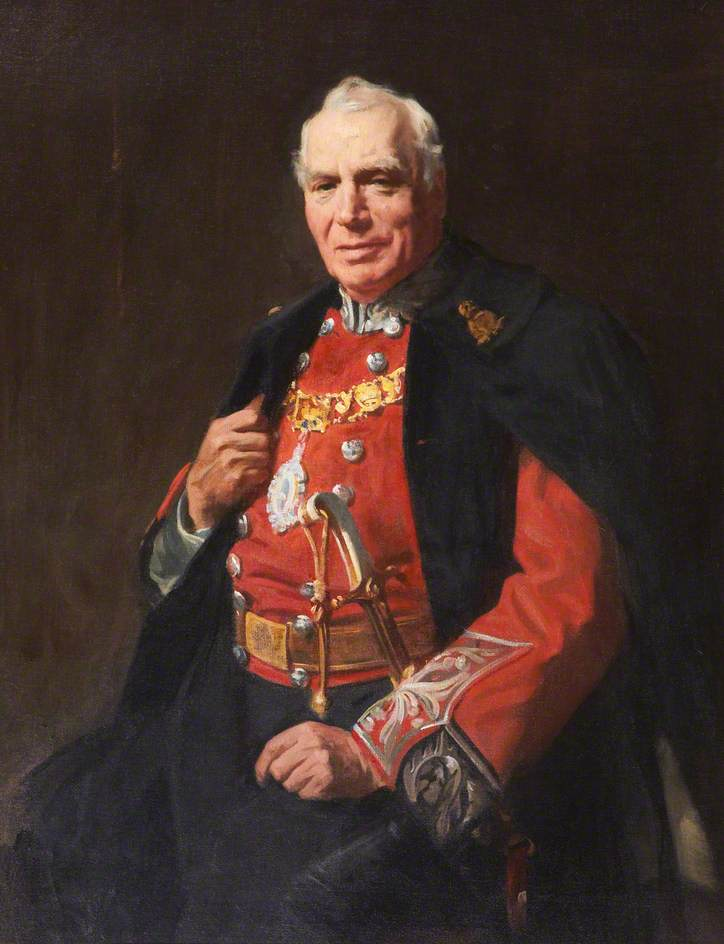
- Oil painting of Inches, 1916

Lord Provost of Edinburgh
- In office 1912–1916
- Preceded by: William Slater Brown
- Succeeded by: John MacLeod

Personal details
- Born: Robert Kirk Inches c. 1845
- Died: 2 August 1918 (aged 72–73) Edinburgh, Scotland
- Resting place: Warriston Cemetery
- Spouse: Mary Gray Morison (m. 1868)
- Children: 7
- Occupation: Goldsmith; silversmith
- Known for: Founder of Hamilton & Inches

Sir Robert Kirk Inches (c. 1845 – 2 August 1918) was a Scottish goldsmith and silversmith. He co-founded the jewellers Hamilton & Inches and served as Lord Provost of Edinburgh from 1912 to 1916.

== Early life ==
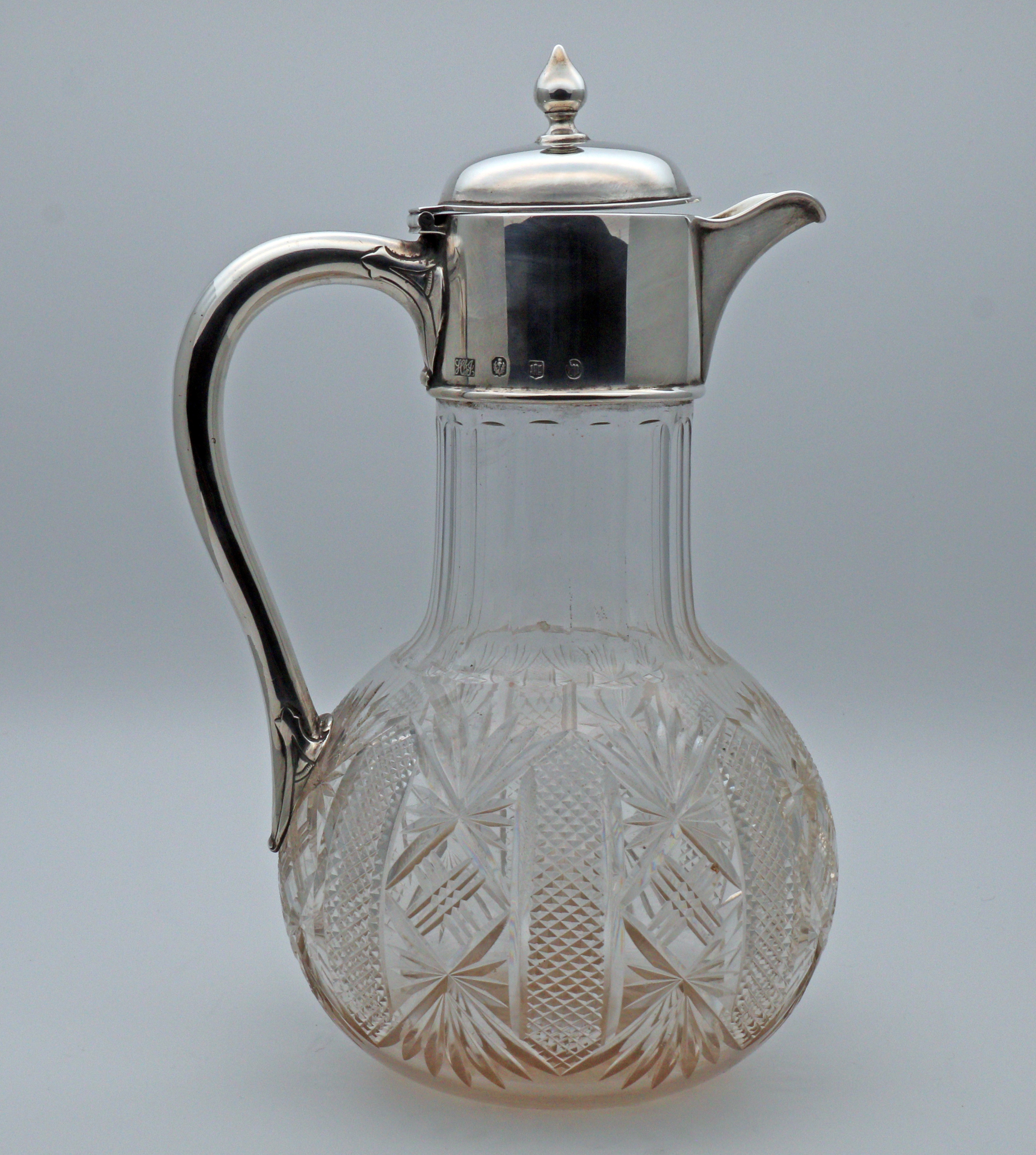
A claret jug by Hamilton and Inches

He was born around 1845. He was the son of Robert Inches, a printer with John Stark & Co at Old Assembly Close on the Royal Mile in Edinburgh.

== Career ==
In 1866 he founded the jewellery firm Hamilton & Inches with his uncle, James Hamilton, at 90 Princes Street in Edinburgh. James retired in 1883. In 1888 Robert Inches bought the property of the watchmaker Robert Bryson & Son at 66 Princes Street and combined it into a new facility at 88/90 Princes Street.

The firm was "by appointment" jewellers to Queen Victoria. At the time, Inches lived at 2 Strathearn Road in the Grange.

In 1903 he co-founded the Edinburgh Association of Goldsmiths, Silversmiths and Watchmakers, formally constituted on 5 February 1906.

== Personal life and death ==
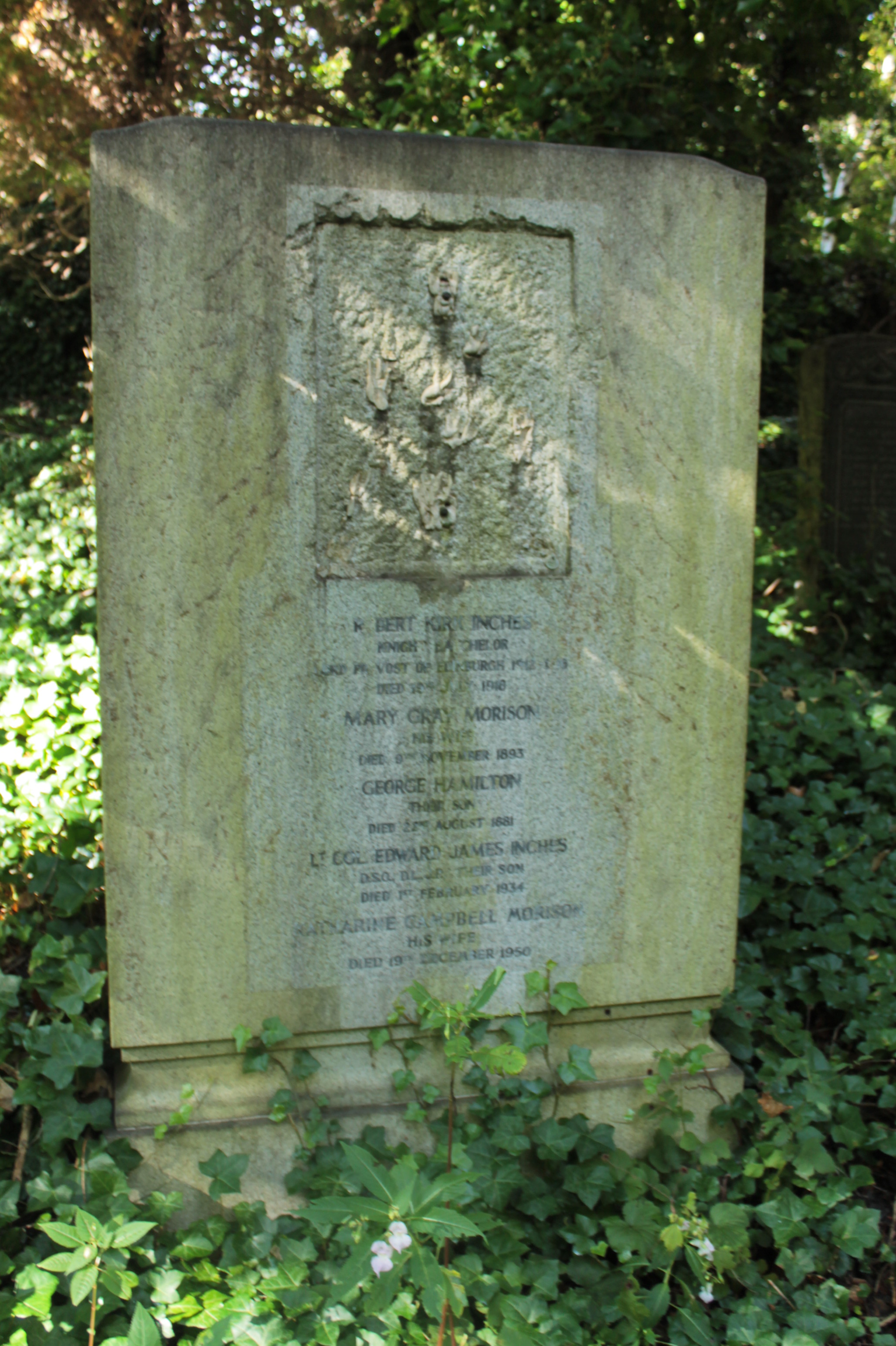
The grave of Sir Robert Kirk Inches, Warriston Cemetery

He married Mary Gray Morison 8 June 1868 in Edinburgh and they had seven children. Isabella Morison Inches (1869–1959), Robert Inches (1871–1900), John Morison Inches (1873–1914), Charles Moore Inches (1875–1946), Edward James Inches (1877–1934), George Hamilton Inches (1880–1881) and Mary Augusta Raeburn Inches (1883–1945). Robert and Edward both of served in the First World War.

He died on 2 August 1918 in Edinburgh. He is buried in Warriston Cemetery in north Edinburgh. The grave lies in the overgrown southern section south of the old railway line, to the south-east of the tunnel access.

Edward took over the company upon his father's death.

Edward's son, Robert Campbell Inches, took the firm over in 1934, and in 1950 the company came under the control of Ian Hamilton Inches.

In 1952 the company moved to 87 George Street. In 1992 it was bought by Asprey of London but retained its historic name for trading.

== Legacy ==
He was knighted by King George V during his period as Lord Provost. His full-length portrait by George Fiddes Watt is held by the City of Edinburgh Council.
