= John Chesser =

John Chesser may refer to:

- John Chesser (architect), Scottish architect
- John Chesser (Canadian politician), member of the Legislative Assembly of Upper Canada
- John William Chesser, Scottish solicitor and politician
