= John MacLeod (solicitor) =

Scottish solicitor and public servant

Sir John MacLeod GBE

Lord Provost of Edinburgh
- In office 1916–1919
- Preceded by: Robert Kirk Inches
- Succeeded by: John William Chesser

Personal details
- Born: John Lorne MacLeod; 20 October 1873 Inveraray, Argyll, Scotland
- Died: 7 September 1946 (aged 72)
- Resting place: Warriston Cemetery
- Education: University of Edinburgh
- Occupation: Solicitor

Sir John Lorne MacLeod (20 October 1873 – 7 September 1946) was a Scottish solicitor and public servant who served as Lord Provost and Lord-Lieutenant of Edinburgh from 1916 to 1919.

== Early life ==
MacLeod was born at Inveraray, Argyll, the son of John Macleod, prison governor of Inveraray Jail and his wife, Mary Mctavish of Tobermory. His sister Phoebe married George Whigham (died 1909), who later became his business partner. Phoebe died at Woodbine Cottage in Colinton in 1925 and is buried with John in Warriston Cemetery.

He studied law at the University of Edinburgh and qualified as a solicitor in 1895.

== Career ==
He practised as a partner in Whigham & MacLeod at 25 Albany Street and lived in a large Georgian townhouse at 72 Great King Street.

He served as a member of Edinburgh City Council from 1905 to 1919, representing Canongate Ward, and was City Treasurer from 1912 to 1914. In 1916 he succeeded Sir Robert Kirk Inches as Lord Provost.

From 1925 until his death he was chairman of the Scottish Life Assurance Company.

He served as Food Commissioner for Scotland from 1920 to 1921 and was a member of the Royal Commission on Food Prices in 1924–1925. He was also chairman of the Consumers' Committees for both Scotland and Great Britain and from 1924 to 1929 served as chairman of the Jute Trade Board for Great Britain. He was chairman of the General Nursing Council for Scotland from 1921 until his death.

Having already been knighted, MacLeod was appointed Knight Grand Cross of the Order of the British Empire (GBE) in the 1920 Birthday Honours for his services as Lord Provost of Edinburgh during the First World War.

From 1933 to 1944 Sir John served as the tenth president of the Cockburn Association, the influential Edinburgh conservation organisation that was founded in 1875.

== Death ==
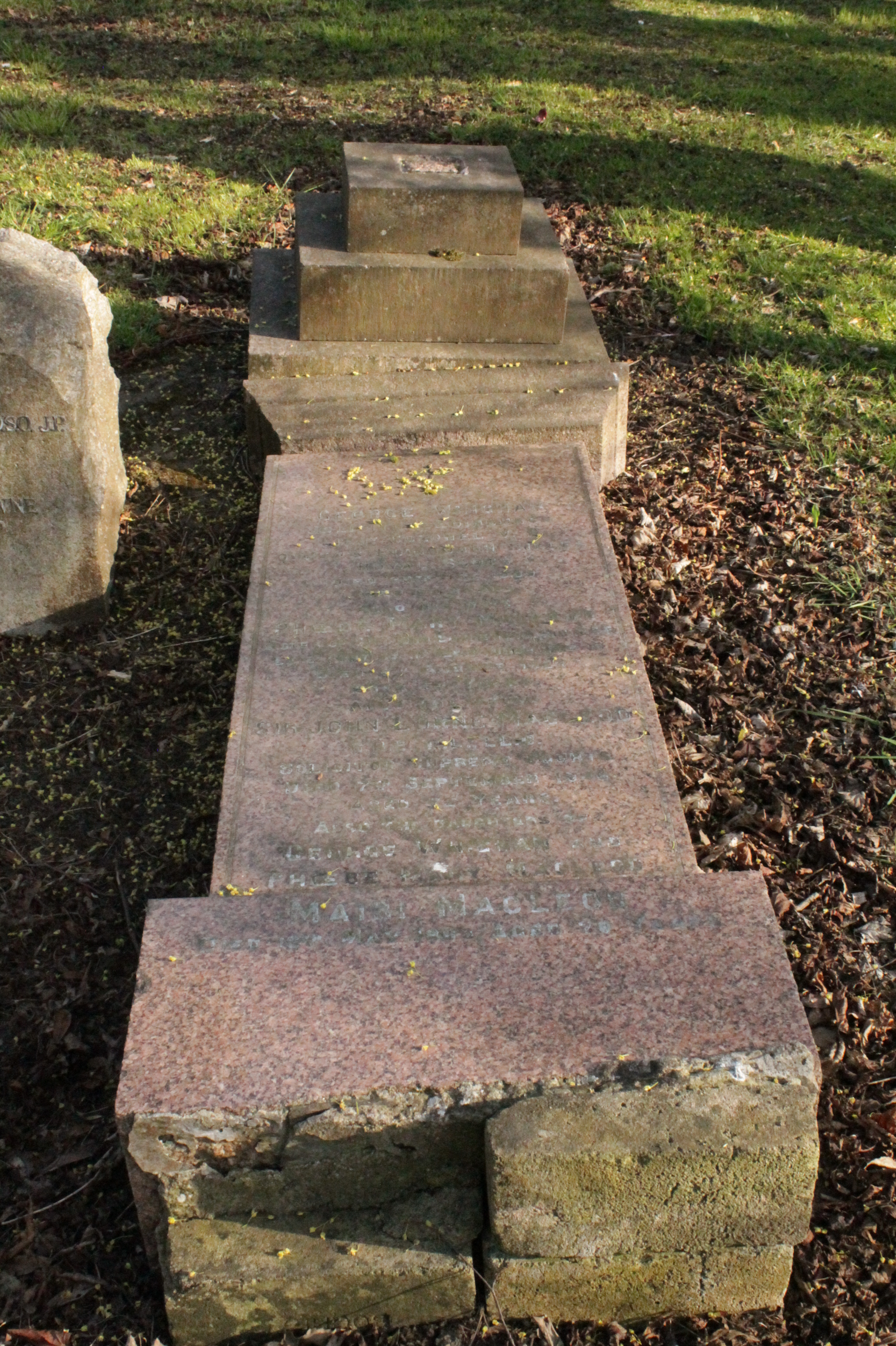
The grave of Sir John Lorne MacLeod

He died on 7 September 1946 and was buried in Warriston Cemetery. The currently (2019) toppled monument lies towards the west end of one of the main east-west paths north of the central vaults.

== Portrait ==
His full length portrait (in military uniform) by George Fiddes Watt is held at Edinburgh City Chambers.
