= Asprey =

British luxury goods company

Coordinates: 51°30′36″N 0°08′33″W

Asprey International Limited
- Type: Private
- Industry: Luxury goods
- Founded: 1781; 245 years ago in Mitcham, Surrey, United Kingdom
- Founder: William Asprey
- Headquarters: London, United Kingdom
- Number of locations: 13 points of sale
- Area served: United Kingdom; United States; Switzerland; Japan
- Key people: John Rigas (Chairman)
- Products: Jewellery; Leather goods; Handbags; Timepieces; Silver; China; Crystal
- Website: www.asprey.com

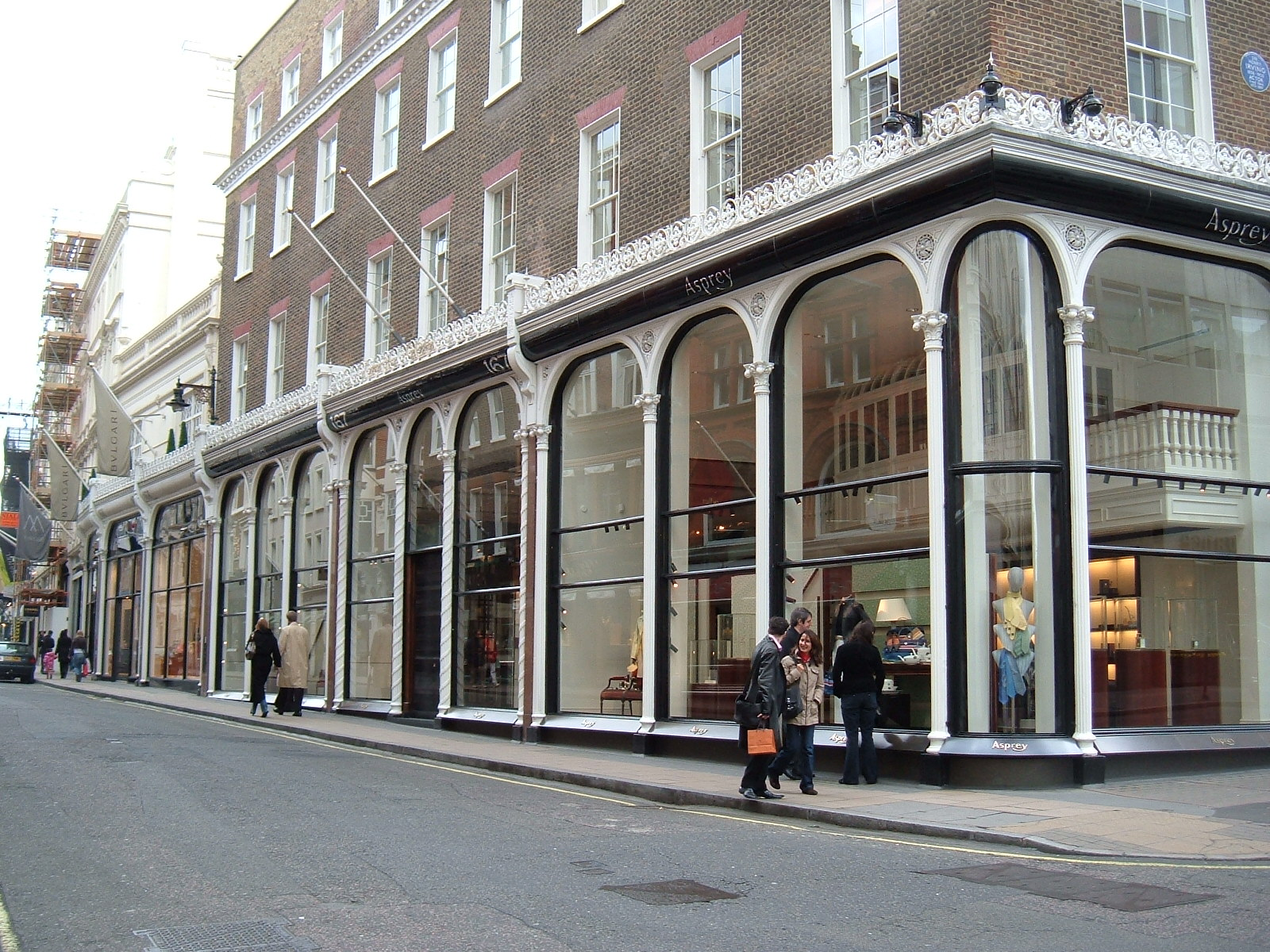
Asprey store on New Bond Street

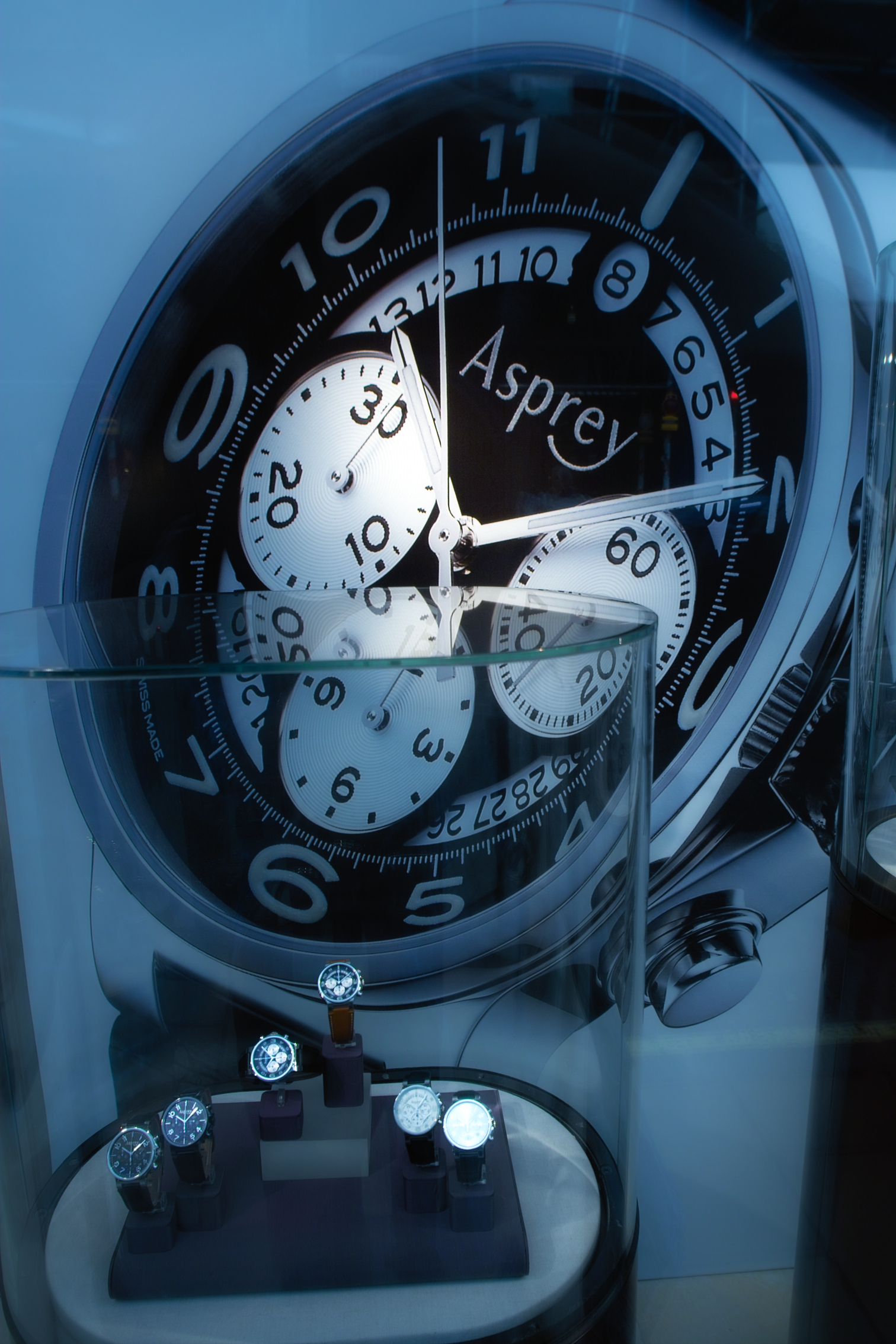
A watch display at Asprey's store on New Bond Street

Asprey is a United Kingdom-based designer, manufacturer and retailer of jewellery, silverware, home goods, leather goods, timepieces, and books.

With its flagship retail store located in Mayfair, London, Asprey is a luxury retailer for royal and celebrity clients. It has held a Royal Warrant from the Prince of Wales and collaborated with Formula 1 on product lines.

== History ==
=== Foundation ===
Asprey was established in England in Mitcham, Surrey, in 1781. Founded as a silk printing business by William Asprey, a descendant of a Huguenot family who fled France during Louis XIV's reign, it soon became a luxury emporium. In 1841, William Asprey's elder son Charles went into partnership with a stationer located on London's Bond Street. In 1847, the family broke with this partner and moved into 167 New Bond Street.

From its central London location, Asprey advertised "articles of exclusive design and high quality, whether for personal adornment or personal accompaniment and to endow with richness and beauty the table and homes of people of refinement and discernment". An early speciality was dressing cases. Asprey crafted traditional cases and designs, mostly in leather, suitable for the new style of travel ushered in by railways. The main competitors at the time were H.J. Cave & Sons. Asprey was recognised for its expertise when it won honourable mention for its dressing cases at the International Exhibition of 1862, but it ultimately lost out to its rivals, H.J. Cave & Sons, in both 1862 and 1867.

The company consolidated its position through acquisitions. In 1859, Asprey absorbed Edwards, a maker of dressing cases and holder of a Royal Warrant. Soon after the merger, Asprey would lose this warrant. The company also purchased the Alfred Club at 22 Albemarle Street, which backed on to the New Bond Street store and meant that Asprey now had entrances on two of London's most fashionable streets. Asprey acquired the case makers Leuchars & Son with their shop at 38–39 Piccadilly, which closed in 1902.

=== 20th century ===
As the business grew, the company acquired manufacturing facilities and hired silversmiths, goldsmiths, jewellers and watchmakers including Ernest Betjeman, the father of the distinguished poet John Betjeman, one of the most highly regarded craftsman and designers of his day. In the 1920s, commissions poured in from around the world, from American billionaire J. Pierpont Morgan to potentates such as the Maharaja of Patiala, who commissioned a huge teak travelling trunk for each of his wives, in which each trunk was fitted with solid silver washing and bathing utensils with waterspouts of ornate tiger head and lined with blue velvet. Queen Mary purchased a five-strand natural pearl necklace with a diamond-set Art Deco clasp in 1948, as a gift for Princess Margaret’s 18th birthday. The necklace featured in many iconic portraits by Sir Cecil Beaton. Asprey cigarette cases became collectable amongst young sophisticates who delighted in its other modern products, including travel clocks, safety razors and automatic pencil sharpeners.

In the 1970s, brothers Algernon and Harry Asprey were asked to resign as managing directors and they sold their shares to Gabriel Harrison's property company. These shares were eventually acquired by Alfred Dunhill Limited (who were 50% owned by Rothmans International) in January 1979, giving them a 7% share in the company. In June 1979, Dunhill acquired another 23% of the company from the Philip Asprey family and in April 1980 bought 6.8% more from the same part of the family, increasing their stake to 36.8%. Dunhill, together with South African businessman Anton Rupert and Mahdi Al Tajir, wished to acquire more of the Asprey family shares but John Asprey, the largest shareholder, held out and eventually, with the assistance of Morgan, Grenfell & Co., was able to outbid Dunhill to acquire shares from family trusts and retain ownership of 50.4% of the company within the family. In 1981, the company was listed on the Unlisted Securities Market.

In July 1990, Sears plc, who at the time held a 25% interest in Asprey, sold Mappin & Webb and Garrard & Co to Asprey, increasing their interest to 38.5% in the expanded group. Naim Attallah became joint managing director in 1990. In 1992, they continued the acquisition strategy and in April they acquired Edinburgh-based Hamilton & Inches for £1.3 million; Watches of Switzerland from H. Samuel for £23.2 million in June and in November 1992, they took over the UK distribution business of Ebel watches. In 1993, they acquired the business assets and name of Swiss jeweller, Les Ambassadeurs for £11 million. Attalah became group chief executive following some structural changes.

In 1995, the group was acquired by Prince Jefri Bolkiah's Amedeo Development Corporation for £244 million, with the Asprey family receiving more than £100 million but retaining a 10% shareholding. Following poor performances since his acquisition, in 1998, Asprey sold off Mappin & Webb, Watches of Switzerland and Hamilton & Inches and was renamed Asprey & Garrard and moved from 112 Regent Street to premises on New Bond Street. 36 Bruton Street, Mayfair, became the flagship store location in celebration of the 240th anniversary of Asprey in 2021

=== Key dates ===
- 1781: Asprey begins trading as William Asprey in Mitcham, Surrey
- 1847: Asprey flagship store opens on New Bond Street, London
- 1851: Asprey receives an 'Honourable Mention' at the Great Exhibition for their lady's dressing case with 'Annie' cipher.
- 1862: Royal Warrant granted by Queen Victoria
- 1889: Edward VII grants the second Royal Warrant to Asprey
- 1925: Queen Mary commissions a necklace, later given to Princess Margaret on the occasion of her 18th birthday
- 1930: Maharaja of Patiala commissions five trunks, one for each of his wives
- 1973: Bespoke chess set is commissioned for Ringo Starr's birthday
- 1975: Asprey received the Queen's Award to Industry by Queen Elizabeth II
- 1990: Asprey and Garrard merge
- 2001: Royal Warrants granted by Queen Elizabeth The Queen Mother, Queen Elizabeth II and Prince of Wales (later King Charles III).
- 2002: Asprey and Garrard split
- 2004: Lord Foster of Thames Bank redesigns the flagship store in New Bond Street, London
- 2006: Asprey celebrates its 225th anniversary and is granted a coat of arms by the English College of Arms
- 2006: Sciens Capital Management and Plainfield Asset Management purchase the brand
- 2009: Asprey becomes the official jewellery sponsor of The Orange British Academy Film Awards
- 2012: Katie Hillier creates new autumn/winter collection
- 2012: Asprey collaborates with light artist Chris Levine to create The Diamond Queen for the Queen's Diamond Jubilee
- 2012: May – New York based Luxury Institute ranks Asprey in the top two luxury brands for 2012
- 2014: Bovet 1822 join Asprey's Timepiece portfolio
- 2015: Asprey becomes an official retailer of Rolex Watches, London
- 2016: Asprey becomes the official jewellery sponsor of The Olivier Awards
- 2017: Opening of Asprey at Takashimaya Osaka and Sunmotoyama Ginza, Japan
- 2021: Asprey flagship store relocated to 36 Bruton Street, Mayfair, marking the 240th anniversary of Asprey
- 2022: Asprey partnered with Bugatti to create exclusive objets d'art, including NFTs and sculptures.

== Products ==
=== Jewellery ===
Asprey has a tradition of producing jewellery inspired by the blooms found in English gardens and woodland flora. Over the decades, jewelled interpretations of flowers have evolved to include daisy, woodland and sunflower collections.

==== Asprey cut ====
The master diamond cutter Gabi Tolkowsky created the Asprey cut. The cushion cut gave Tolkowsky options for incorporating the Asprey "A" inscription around the edges of the stone. The result was the 61-facet Asprey cut, maximising light refraction to brilliant effect. Carat weights of Asprey-cut diamonds range from 0.50 to 3. Asprey-cut diamonds are inscribed on one side of the cushion with the GIA certificate number and with four distinctive 'A's on the other. It is also the only diamond that has the letter "A" on the crown; the Asprey cut has a flower in the centre to create softness. The shape of the Asprey cut means that the cutting process can be done only by hand, unlike many other stones that involve machine cutting.

=== Leather goods ===
The latest handbag collection is the Beverly Hills collection, inspired by the 20th anniversary of the Boutique at the Beverly Hills Hotel, Los Angeles The men's collection includes wallets, cardholders and travel watch cases. Other items include briefcases and backgammon boards. An Asprey bag owned by Margaret Thatcher was sold at auction in 2011.

=== Silver ===
Asprey offers classic and contemporary silver pieces – such as sterling silver cocktail shakers, in traditional and contemporary, novel designs such as the Rocket cocktail shaker and many barware accompaniments. Asprey also produce children's items, including tooth boxes, picture frames and rattles.

=== Trophies ===
Asprey have designed and manufactured sporting trophies, including the Race to Dubai trophy and the Dubai World Championship (DWC) trophy. In addition, Asprey is responsible for crafting the ICC cricket trophies, Wimbledon championship runner-up and winner's salvers, the Arab Club Champions Cup trophy, as well as the FA Cup, and Premier League medals. Asprey has also crafted the Formula 1 Grand Prix trophies for the British and French races, the Soccer Aid for UNICEF Perpetual Shield, the Epsom Derby Stakes trophy, the LIV Golf tournament trophies, and the Gallagher Premiership Rugby trophy.

=== Books ===
The Asprey fine and rare book tradition evolved from the early 1900s when small compendia of reference books were produced. However, it was not until the Second World War, when raw materials were in such short supply, that Asprey began to offer second-hand and antiquarian books. Following the war, this practice was further developed to include a range of books, old and new, that were bound by Asprey, thus augmenting the company's tradition in leather goods. Today, Asprey offers a range of first and limited editions, many in their original bindings and some, if appropriate, in leather bindings customised by Asprey.

=== Asprey Polo ===
Previously known as Argosy, Asprey Polo has developed products for player and pony. The range includes boots, saddles, bridles, helmets and mallets and is available from Asprey Polo. Asprey has a history in polo, sponsoring teams and creating trophies for polo tournaments. It sponsored a 40-goal team in the Argentine Open in 1996, winning the Championship and reaching the final in 1997.

== Bespoke and master craftsmanship ==
Asprey has maintained its London workshops, allowing repairs and alterations to be completed while a customer waits. An expanded jewellery, silver and leather workshop based in London are where classic skills are employed by silversmiths, goldsmiths, jewellers, leatherworkers, engravers and watchmakers.

The firm's craftsmen made a silver-gilt sandwich. They toasted three slices of bread in their workshop, fried the eggs, broiled the bacon, assembled the sandwich, made a mould, and cast it. It now sits on the desk of a Texan millionaire.

=== "The Diamond Queen" ===
To mark Queen Elizabeth II's Diamond Jubilee, Asprey partnered with light artist Chris Levine to create a new work based upon his 2004 portrait Equanimity, commissioned by The Jersey Heritage Trust in 2004. This new work is entitled The Diamond Queen.

Asprey re-created the Queen's diamond diadem, worn at the Coronation in 1953. One thousand white diamonds were set in platinum by Asprey craftsmen and overlaid onto the original three-dimensional image of the Queen to create the luminescent installation.

== Royal patronage ==
In 1862, Asprey was granted a Royal Warrant by Queen Victoria. The Prince of Wales, later to be crowned Edward VII, granted another Royal Warrant. In 1953, for the coronation of Elizabeth II, Asprey paid homage with the Asprey Coronation Year Gold Collection, which featured a dessert, coffee and liqueur service in 18-carat gold and weighed almost 27 pounds. In April 1953, it went on show in the New Bond Street store and subsequently toured the United States. Asprey today holds a Royal warrant as silversmiths and Goldsmiths under HRH Prince of Wales patronage.

== In popular culture ==
=== Film ===
Asprey designed the Heart of the Ocean necklace that was featured in the 1997 James Cameron blockbuster Titanic. Asprey has featured in a number of films:

- Help! (1965)
- Titanic (1997)
- Flawless
- Match Point (2005)
- Notes on a Scandal (2006)
- Sherlock Holmes
- Confessions of a Shopaholic (2009)
- The Ghost Writer
- Nanny McPhee: The Big Bang (2010)
- The Tourist
- The 2011 film My Week with Marilyn was filmed at Asprey, 167 New Bond Street

In 2009, Asprey became the official jewellery sponsor of The Orange British Academy Film Awards and continues this partnership today. Asprey collaborated with Angelina Jolie and Brad Pitt to create the Asprey's Protector Collection of fine jewellery for both children and adults in 2009.

=== Literature ===
- In Jeffrey Archer's novel First Among Equals, Raymond Gould gives his mistress an Asprey miniature of a ministerial red box inscribed with the words "For Your Eyes Only."
- In Kevin Kwan's novel Rich People Problems, Edison Cheng learns that the only items bequeathed to him in family matriarch Shang Su Yi's will are a pair of Asprey sapphire-and-platinum cuff links previously given to his grandfather, Sir James Young, by a Malaysian sultan.

== Corporate ==
Asprey continues to trade as a luxury goods house, active in market such as the US and Japan. According to a survey of US high-net-worth consumers polled for the Luxury Institute's 2012 Luxury Brand Status Index, Asprey was ranked among the top two of international fine jewellery brands. In March 2006, Sciens Capital Management, the US private equity firm, bought Asprey. "This is a historic luxury brand, and that is part of our reason for acquiring it," said chairman John Rigas, following the purchase from Lawrence Stroll, Silas Chou (of Sportswear Holdings Ltd) and Edgar Bronfman Jr.

Subsequently, Rigas re-focused the business to concentrate on flagships and stand alone stores in key international locations. In 2009, Hermés, the French luxury fashion house, made a property investment purchasing the freehold of the New Bond Street shop that Asprey occupied. Asprey held a 31-year lease on the premises and continued to remain in the space until 2021. Asprey moved to 36 Bruton Street at the end of 2021, its new permanent flagship, firstly creating an installation space designed by the Storey Group, an immersive experience of discovery and exploration.

== Arms ==
Coat of arms of Asprey

Notes
Granted 5 March 2007
Crest
Issuing from flames Proper an eagle displayed Purpure beaked and grasping in the dexter claws a silversmith's raising hammer and in the sinister an estoile of five rays Or.
Torse
Or and Purpure.
Escutcheon
Per fess Purpure and Or a Pale counterchanged in the Purpure an Asprey Cut Diamond of cushion shape culet downwards Argent and in the Or an Ancient Crown Purpure.
Supporters
On the dexter an Alligator Purpure and on the sinister a Lizard Purpure.
Motto
It Can Be Done
