= William Slater Brown (Lord Provost) =

20th-century Scottish businessman (1844–1917)

Sir William Slater Brown

Lord Provost of Edinburgh
- In office 1909–1912
- Preceded by: James Puckering Gibson
- Succeeded by: Robert Inches

Personal details
- Born: 1844
- Died: 19 April 1917 (aged 72–73)
- Resting place: Warriston Cemetery
- Spouse: Margaret Dods (m. 1865)
- Children: 6
- Occupation: Businessman

Sir William Slater Brown (1844 – 19 April 1917) was an early 20th century Scottish businessman who served as Lord Provost of Edinburgh from 1909 to 1912.

== Early life ==
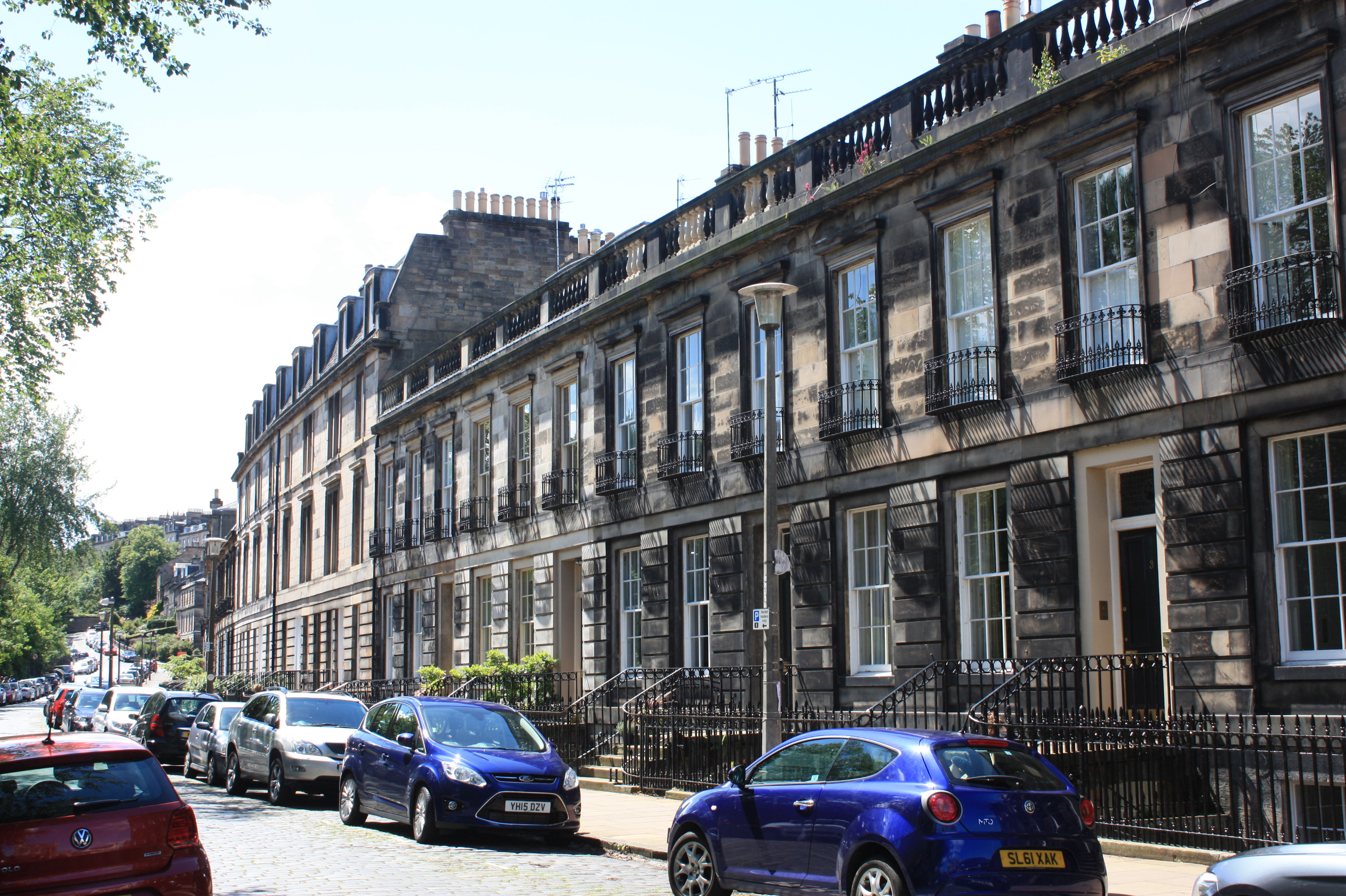
Dean Terrace, Edinburgh

He was born in 1844 the second son of Henry Raeburn Brown (born 1806) a tailor, and his wife Helen Clyde.

== Career ==
In 1909 he succeeded James Puckering Gibson as Lord Provost of Edinburgh.

During his period of office his duties included laying the foundation stone on Portobello Town Hall. As with Leith the building of a Town Hall was an odd gesture as Portobello had ceased to be an independent town and was then part of Edinburgh. Brown was knighted in the second year of his provostship by King George V.

He was succeeded as Lord Provost by Robert Kirk Inches in 1912.

== Personal life and death ==
He was married to Margaret Dods around 1865 and they had six children including Henry Raeburn Brown (born 1869).

In later life he lived at 17 Dean Terrace in the Stockbridge district of Edinburgh.

He died on 19 April 1917 and is buried in Warriston Cemetery.

== Artistic recognition ==
He was portrayed in his Lord Provost robes by George Fiddes Watt.
