= Hamilton & Inches =

Scottish luxury jeweller

- Type: Private
- Industry: Luxury goods
- Founded: 1866; 160 years ago in New Town, Edinburgh, Scotland
- Founder: Sir Robert Kirk Inches
- Headquarters: Edinburgh, Scotland
- Number of locations: 1 showroom and point of sale in Edinburgh
- Area served: United Kingdom
- Key people: Victoria Houghton (Chief executive officer)
- Products: Jewellery; Timepieces; Silver
- Website: hamiltonandinches.com

Hamilton & Inches is a luxury jeweller and jewellery designer based in Edinburgh, Scotland. The company has held a royal warrant to the British monarch as goldsmiths, silversmiths, clock & watchmakers for over 120 years. The company's main headquarters are on George Street in New Town, Edinburgh. The company was founded by Sir Robert Inches and his uncle James Hamilton in 1866.

In addition to manufacturing jewellery, the jewellers also historically held the honour of being "His Majesty’s Clockmaker and Keeper and Dresser of His Majesty’s Clocks, Watches and Pendulums in Palaces and Houses in his Ancient Kingdom of Scotland" in the Royal Household of Scotland. This role was renewed in 2010 as "Silversmiths and Clock Specialists to her Majesty The Queen".

In addition to fine jewellery Hamilton and Inches is known for producing trophies for various sporting events, including the Scottish Open and the Lanark Silver Bell.

== History ==
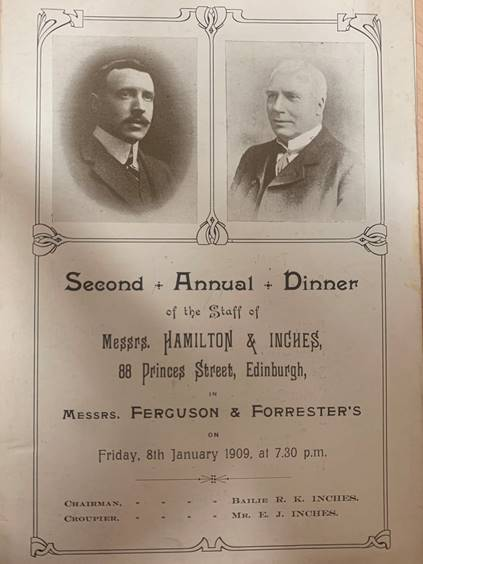
Edward and Robert K Inches 1909

Hamilton & Inches was founded in 1866 on Princes Street in Edinburgh by Robert Inches and his uncle James Hamilton. On 1 June 1866 Hamilton & Inches registered their hallmark with the Edinburgh assay office.

In 1903 Robert Inches helped found the Edinburgh Association of Goldsmiths, Silversmiths and Watchmakers, ‘to prevent firms from selling ‘shoddy’ goods and protecting consumer interest’.

Following Robert's death, the company passed to his son, Edward James Inches. In 1952 the company relocated from Princes Street to their present home of number 87 George Street.

In the 1970s, the Hamiltons and the Inches were neighbours: living at 17 and 18 Inverleith Row in north Edinburgh.

In 1992, the company was acquired by Asprey. In 1998, there was a management buy out led by Julia Ogilvy, whose husband James is a second cousin of Prince Charles. Ogilvy left the company in 2003.

=== Recent Developments ===
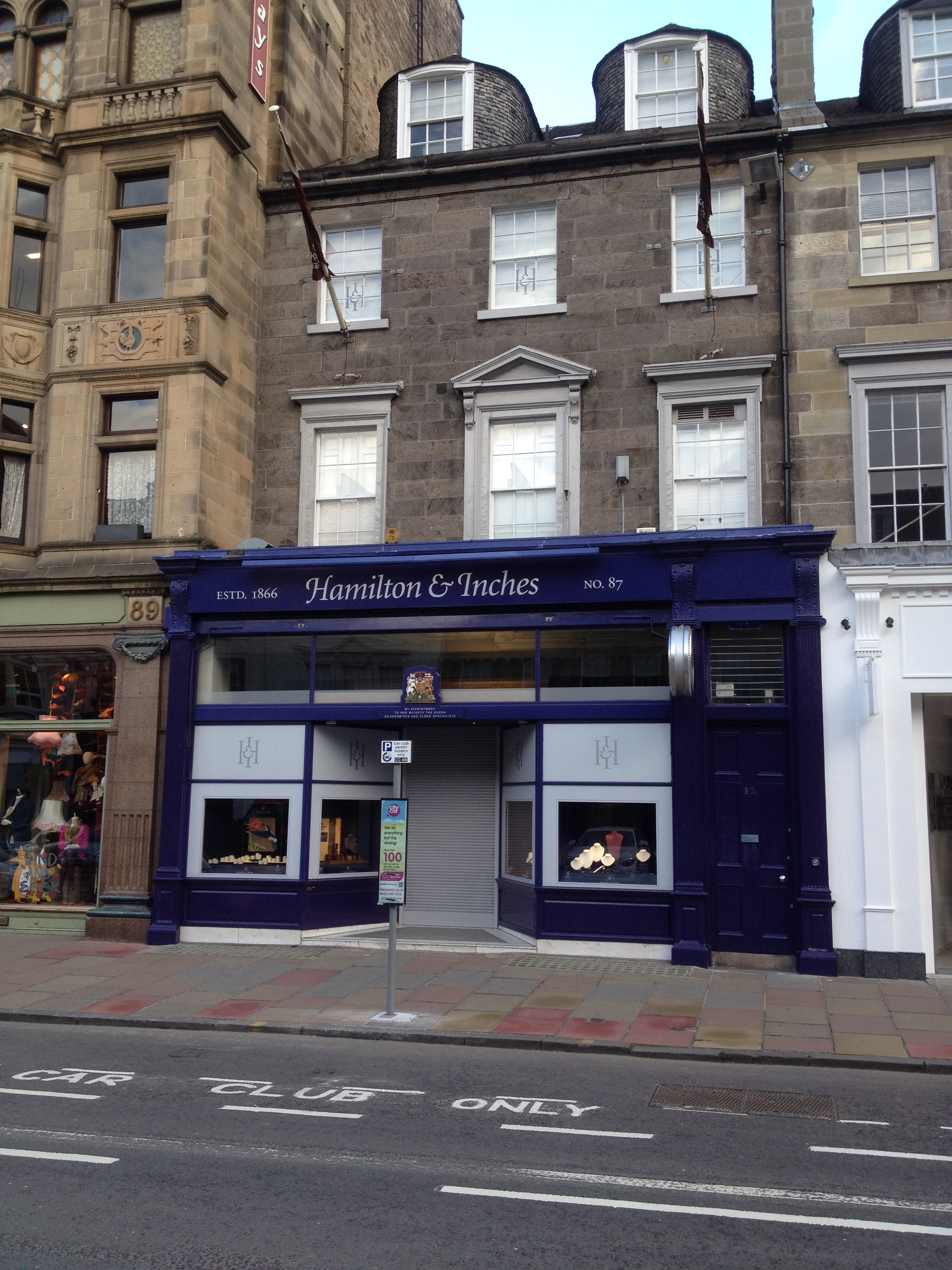
Hamilton & Inches' old showroom on George Street, Edinburgh

In 2016 Hamilton & Inches celebrated 150 years of business. Her Majesty Queen Elizabeth II visited the jewellers to mark the occasion, and was presented with a bejewelled bowl designed after a loch on the river Tay.

In 2021 the Hamilton & Inches main showroom underwent a restoration. The outside of the showroom was clad in Scottish Whinstone, while the interior was renovated with curved glass panels set in antique bronze and jewellery displayed on a carved breccia marble plinth with silk on top.

Hamilton & Inches has also continued in its role as a clock and watch specialist, and has significant space allocated to the sale of Patek Philippe and Rolex watches, doubling this space in 2021.

== Public clocks ==
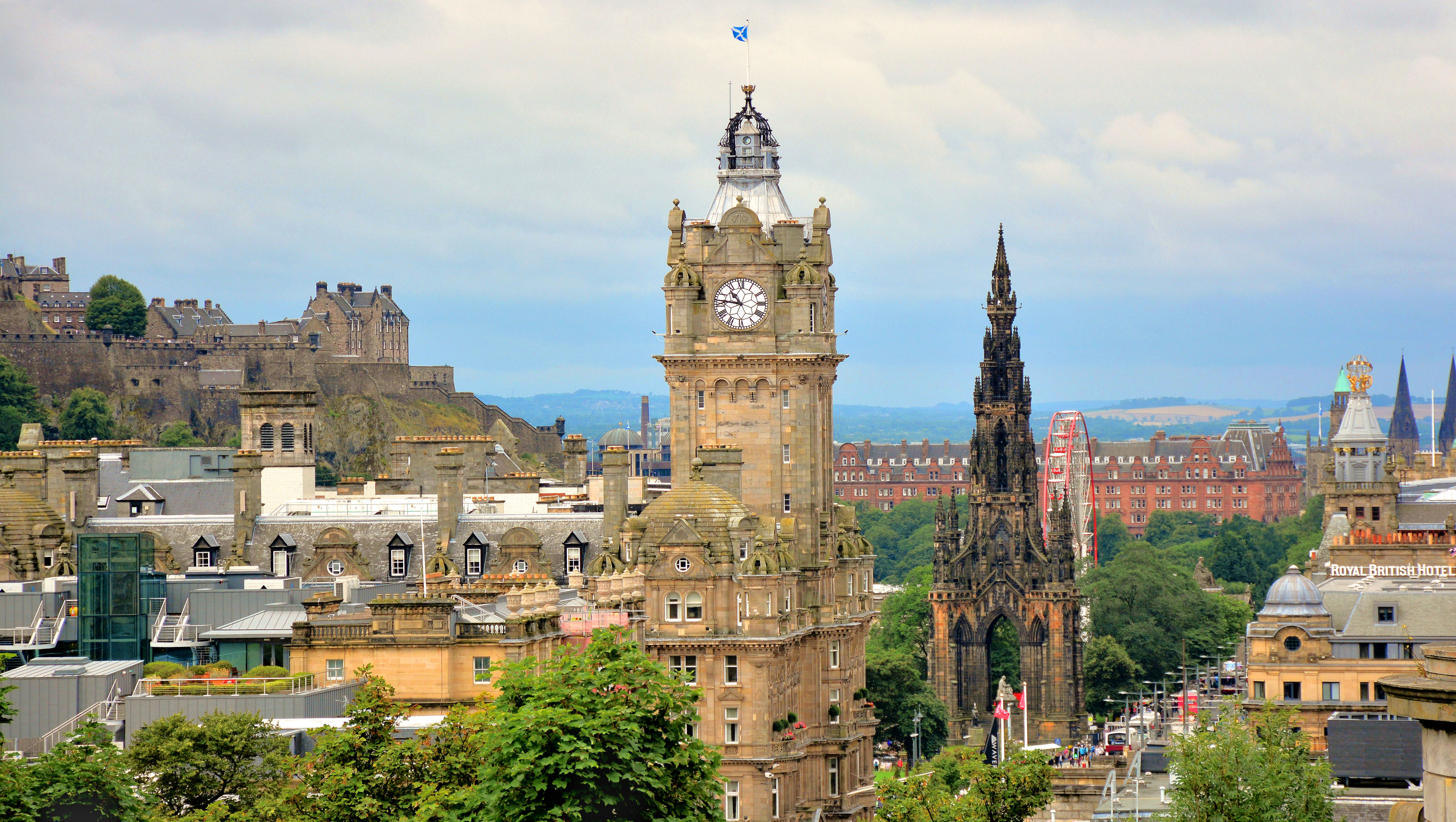
The clock on the North British Hotel

- North British Hotel, 1902
- Church, Kirk Yetholm 1933
