= Lucy Leuchars =

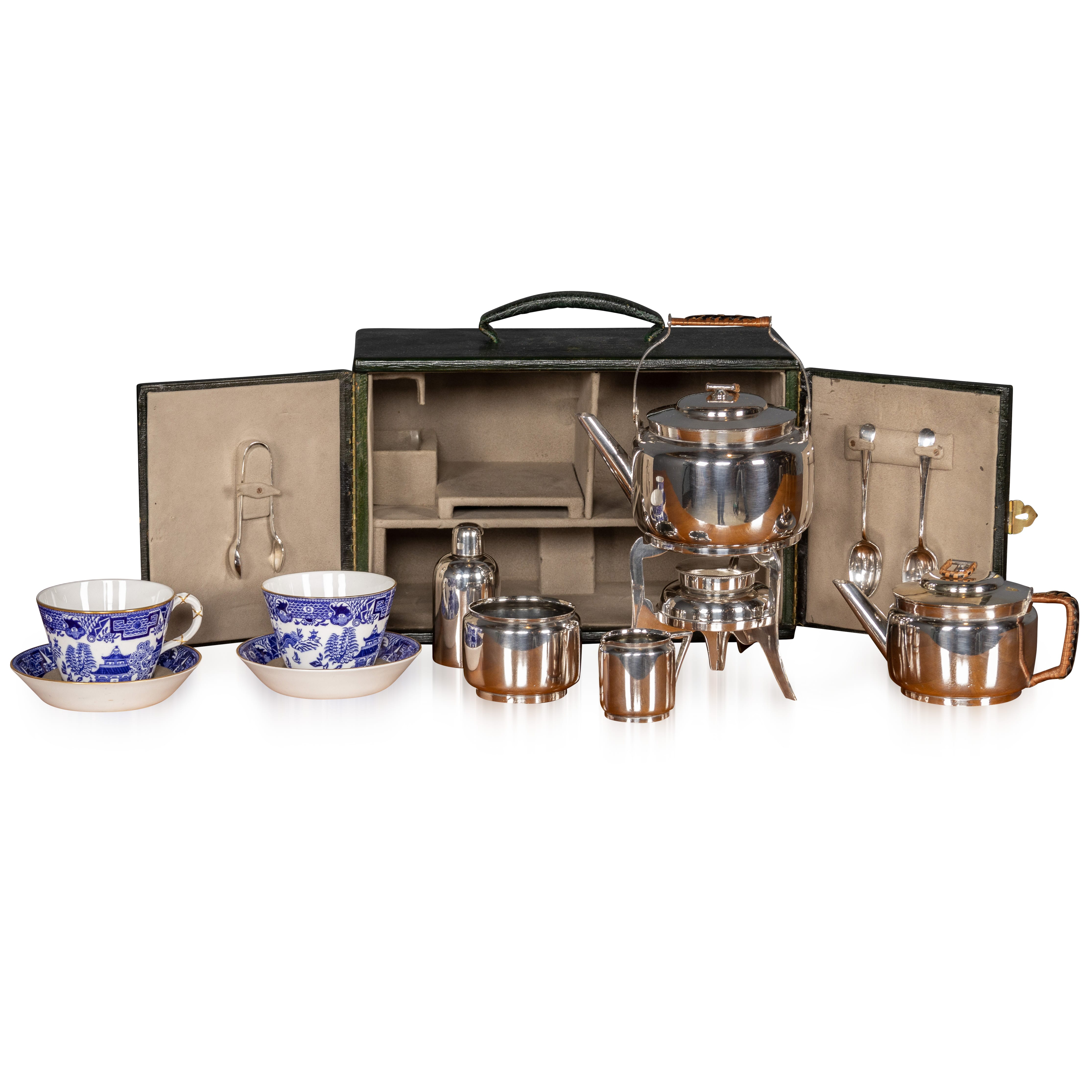
Traveling Tea Service by Leuchars - Pushkin's

Lucy Leuchars (died 1847), was an English case manufacturer and entrepreneur.

Leuchars was married to James Leuchars, who founded a dressing case company in Piccadilly in London in 1794. When she was widowed in 1822, she took over the company under the name L. Leuchars.

In 1837, Leuchars received a royal warrant to Queen Victoria, and she received the title "Case Manufacturer" to the queen. The business expanded to 39 Piccadilly in 1841 and became known as Lucy Leuchars & Son, with her son William joining the firm. After Lucy’s death in 1847, William took full control.

Leuchars gained recognition for their dressing cases, earning medals at the Great Exhibition in 1851, the International Exhibition in 1862, and a silver medal at the Paris Exposition in 1867.

In 1870, under the name Leuchars & Son, William and his son, also named William, opened a shop at 2 Rue de la Paix in Paris. After William Sr died in 1871, his son continued the business, later winning a gold medal at the 1878 Paris Exposition.

In 1884, Leuchars relocated their manufactory from 31 Gerrard Street, Soho, to 8 Sherwood Street, Golden Square. In 1888, William Jr sold the business and manufactory to Asprey.

Despite the sale, Leuchars continued to trade from 38 & 39 Piccadilly until 1902..
