= 20 Ratho–Chesser =

Bus route in Edinburgh, Scotland

20

Overview
- Operator: Lothian Buses
- Garage: Longstone
- Vehicle: Single-decker buses
- Livery: Lothian FOTF
- Status: Operating
- Former operators: First, McGill's

Route
- Start: Chesser
- End: The Calders
- Length: 26 minutes

The Lothian Buses service 20 is one of the few council-supported bus routes in Edinburgh. This route operates between The Calders and Chesser.

== History ==
The route has existed since at least 2008. That year, it was a circular route, starting from Chesser and terminating at Westside Plaza before continuing to its premier terminus. On the 26 June 2009, it was extended to serve Hermiston Gait rather than being a circular route, and was further extended to the Gyle Centre three years later.

In 2014, the route had been extended to Ratho Hallcroft Park, near the city limits. This was done to still give the residents of Ratho a bus service after the service 12 was cut back to Gyle Centre.

On 31 August 2020, the route transferred from Lothian Buses to First Scotland East. As part of the change, the route was re-extended from Hermiston Gait to Chesser and a stop at Ingliston Park and Ride was added. The service operated at an hourly frequency. The change led to increased fares for passengers changing on to the tram, as the bus and tram are now operated by different companies.

In July 2022, First Bus announced that it planned to withdraw the route along with two others. The company blamed driver shortages. On 1 September 2022, it was announced that the services would continue to run for another year. However, the frequency was reduced with the number of buses per day cut from 30 to 16.

Its former owner had acquired the route back from McGill’s. As in 2024, Lothian got the contract to run this service, along with the service 32. The current route starts at Chesser and finishes at The Calders.

== Incident ==
On the 7 May 2015, a bearded dragon was discovered in a bag unattended on the bus. It was nicknamed ‘Blakey,’ as an On the Buses reference when the SSPCA came to take action for the lizard.

== Route ==
The route’s timetable is more abnormal compared to other Lothian Buses services, with there being only 5 whole journeys and a partial journey both ways. The frequency operates at every 60 minutes Monday to Saturday.

- Ratho (Former Route)
- Ratho Station (Former Route)
- Ingliston Park and Ride (Former route)
- The Calders
- Westside Plaza
- Clovenstone
- Kingsknowe
- Longstone
- Chesser Asda
