= Elizabeth Chesser =

British physician and medical journalist (1877–1940)

- Born: Elizabeth Macfarlane Sloan; 18 May 1877; Glasgow
- Died: 16 February 1940 (aged 62); London
- Other names: E. Sloan Chesser
- Occupations: Physician, medical writer, journalist
- Relatives: John William Chesser (brother-in-law)

Elizabeth Macfarlane Chesser (née Sloan; 18 May 1877 – 16 February 1940) was a British physician and medical journalist, writing and lecturing especially on women's health.

== Early life and education ==
Elizabeth Macfarlane Sloan was born in Glasgow, the daughter of Elizabeth Macfarlane and Samuel Sloan. Her father was a physician. She attended Queen Margaret College, Glasgow, where she was awarded an MB and ChB in 1901. In 1919 she obtained her medical degree from Glasgow with a thesis titled "Breast-Feeding: Faradisation of the Mammary Glands".

== Career ==
Chesser became a noted medical journalist, for almost twenty years a regular contributor to the Glasgow Herald. By 1914 she had published numerous articles and books on the topic of motherhood, sex education, and childrearing. In 1914 Chesser returned to full-time medical practice, acquiring an address in Harley Street. She threw herself into the war effort, acting as medical officer at the Woolwich arsenal and the Eltham hostels for munitions workers, and working at the Carshalton maternity and child welfare centre. Chesser also became temporary assistant physician at the Queen's Hospital for Children.

Chesser championed the importance of female education, suffrage and employment; she also supported eugenic policies, and considered pauperism a personal moral failing. She coined the phrase "suburban neurosis" for the health issues associated with the middle-class housewife of the 1930s. "Her publications and public utterances gave rise to much controversy," explained The Guardian in a 1940 obituary, "but by her vision and foresight she did much to bring the latest teachings of medical science into the homes of the people."

== Selected publications ==
- Perfect Health for Women and Children (1913)
- From Girlhood to Womanhood (1913)
- My Baby in Sickness and Health (1913)
- Woman, Marriage and Motherhood (1913)
- Physiology and Hygiene for Girls' Schools and Colleges (1914)
- Health and Psychology of the Child (1925)
- Child Health and Character (1927)
- Youth: A Book for Two Generations (1928)
- The Woman Who Knows Herself (1929)
- Seven Stages of Childhood (1937)
- Five Phases of Love (1939)

== Personal life ==
Elizabeth Sloan married Stennett Chesser in 1902. They had two sons, Stennett Sloan Chesser and Samuel John Chesser, both of whom became doctors and served with the Royal Army Medical Corps during World War II. Elizabeth Sloan Chesser died in 1940, at her home in London, aged 62 years.
