= William Sleigh =

William Sleigh may refer to:

- William Lowrie Sleigh (1866–1945), Scottish businessman
- William Campbell Sleigh (1818–1887), English lawyer and politician
