= Chesser, Edinburgh =

Suburb of Edinburgh, Scotland

Coordinates: 55°55′43.05″N 3°14′55.06″W

Chesser (/ˈtʃɛzər/ CHEZ-ər) is a mainly residential suburb of Edinburgh, Scotland, east of the Water of Leith. It, with Longstone, is to the south-west, Allan Park and Craiglockhart to the south, Slateford, Hutchison and Moat to the east, and Gorgie Road to the north.

== History ==
The area is named after John William Chesser, who was elected Lord Provost of Edinburgh in 1919 and died in office in 1921. In his previous role as Convenor of Markets and Slaughterhouses, he had organised the building of the new markets and slaughterhouses in the area.

The Gorgie cattle market had a railway line that connected to Edinburgh Suburban and Southside Junction Railway the railway is now a footpath.

The Edinburgh Corn Exchange in Chesser is a venue for live events. There has been recent regeneration of predominantly early 20th-century housing stock, supplemented with modern development. Sporting and shopping facilities include an Asda supermarket. In 2016 the former fruit market in Chesser Avenue was redeveloped into a retail development as the Edinburgh West Retail Park.

== Transport ==
The 20 Ratho–Chesser bus route connects Chesser with Ratho, Ingliston Park and Ride, and Edinburgh Park railway station.

== Sources ==
- Google Maps
