= John Chesser (architect) =

Scottish architect (1819–1892)

- Born: 18 September 1819; Dalmeny House, Dalmeny, Edinburgh, Scotland
- Died: 2 February 1892 (aged 72); Corstorphine, Edinburgh, Scotland
- Occupation: Architect
- Years active: 1852–1880s
- Spouse: Ann Stennett
- Children: John William Chesser

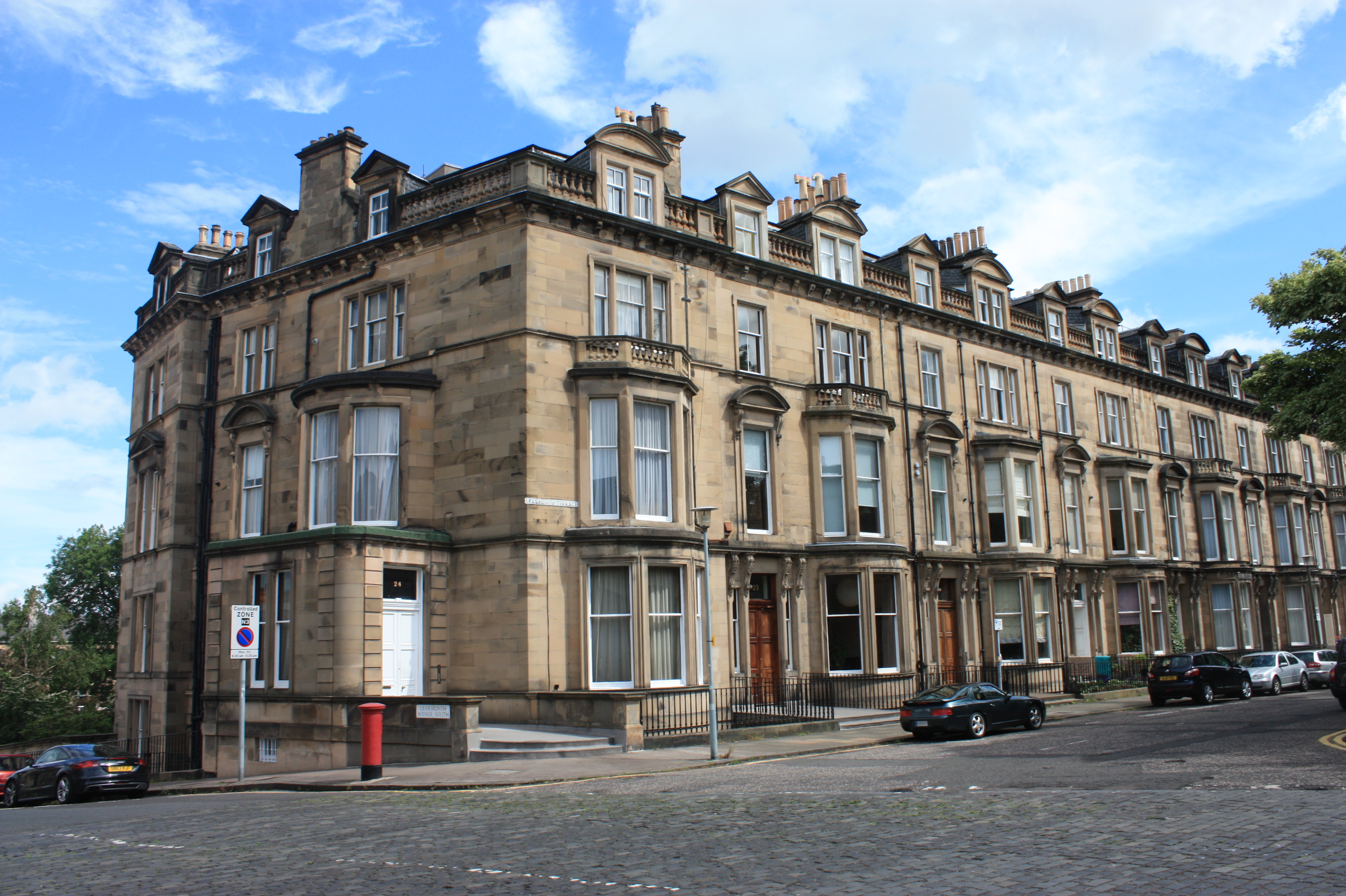
Learmonth Terrace in Edinburgh's West End

John Chesser (18 September 1819 – 2 February 1892) was a Scottish architect largely based in Edinburgh. He was described as "the prime exponent of terrace design at the time". A very high number of his works are now category A listed buildings, evidencing the quality of his work, particularly in the West End of Edinburgh.

== Early life ==
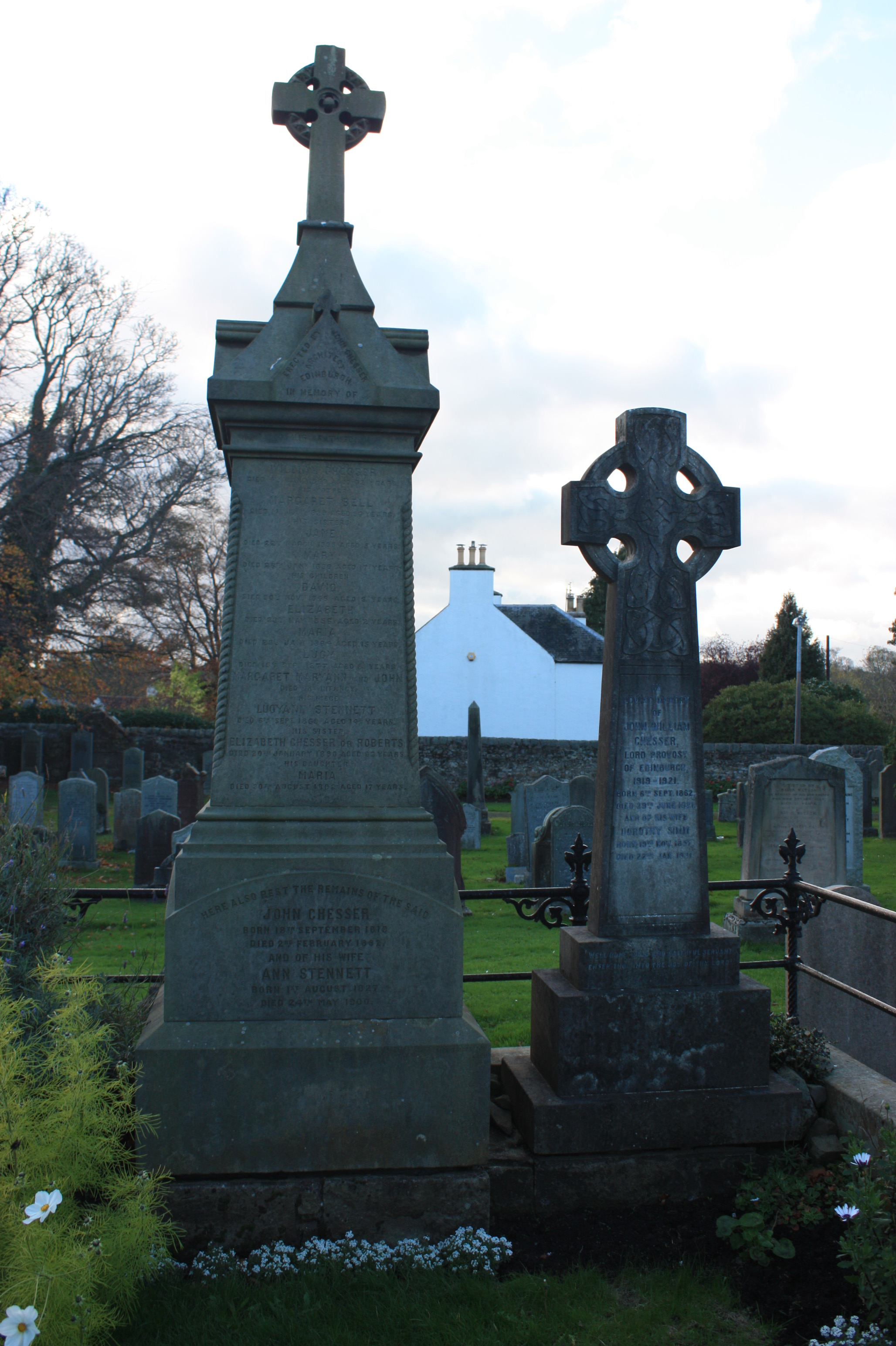
The grave of John Chesser, Cramond churchyard

He was born on 18 September 1819 on the Dalmeny House estate, a few miles west of Edinburgh, his elderly father, William Chesser (1757–1849), being Clerk of Works there.

After spending some years working on the Revesby House estate in Lincolnshire he returned to Dalmeny to fill his father’s shoes on his death.

== Career ==
By 1852, he appears to have been working for the City Architect, David Cousin.

Through his experience, in 1858, he then gained a post as Superintendent of Works at George Heriot’s School following the death of Alexander Black. This role included developing the huge swathes of land around the city owned by the Heriot Trust, particularly in the West End of Edinburgh, and also building ten Heriot Trust Schools around the city for the less privileged children to attend.

He lived most of his later life at 1 Chalmers Street, close to Heriot's School.

== Personal life and death ==
His son John William Chesser (1862–1921) grew to adulthood and became Lord Provost of Edinburgh, 1919–1921. He is buried with a separate monument, immediately to the north.

He died in Corstorphine, Edinburgh, on 2 February 1892 and is buried in Cramond Kirkyard. His father, William, his mother, Margaret Bell (died 1829), his wife, Ann Stennett (1827–1900), and numerous children (most of whom died young) lie with him.

== Works ==
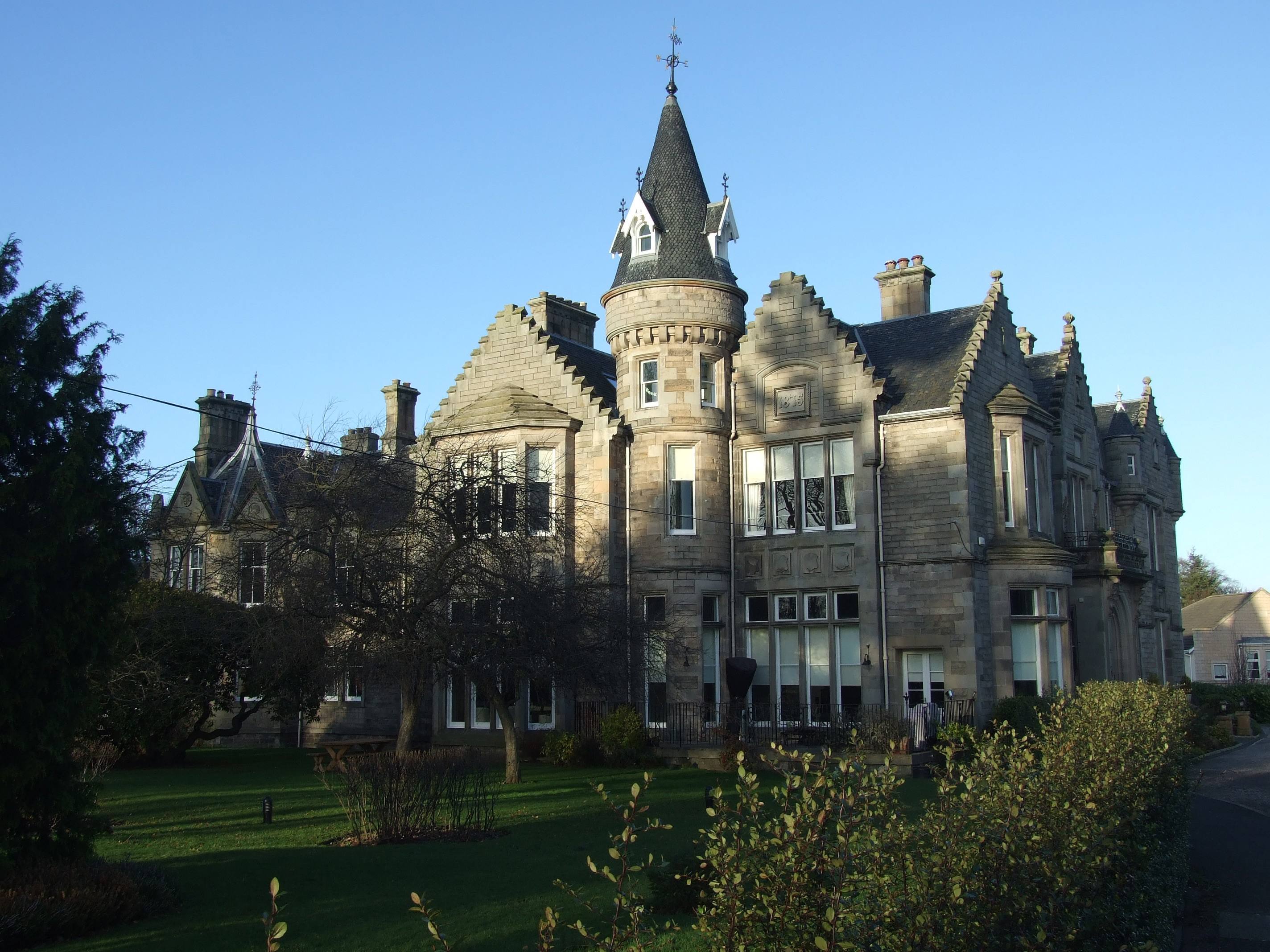
Southfield House (1875), Liberton, by John Chesser. Later adapted and used as a sanatorium.

Chesser was particularly prevalent at tenemental streets and terraced houses, so much of his work is entire streets and areas rather than individual buildings. All works are in Edinburgh unless otherwise noted.

- Lennox Street (c. 1860) originally called Leuchars Street - completed the scheme begun by John Tait and done for the Heriot Trust.
- 2-24 East Claremont Street (1860)
- Bellevue Place (1860)
- Buckingham Terrace (1860)
- Howard Place, St Andrews, Fife (1860)
- Hope Park estate St Andrews, Fife (1864)
- Clifton Terrace (1865)
- Belgrave Crescent (1865)
- Rosebery Crescent (1865)
- Magdala Crescent and Mews (1869)
- Grosvenor Crescent (1869)
- South-east quarter of St Mary Street Improvement Plan
- Coates Gardens (1871) odd numbers
- 36-48 Palmerston Place (1872)
- Learmonth Terrace (1873) (works completed by McGibbon & Ross)
- Eglinton Crescent (1873)
- Glencairn Crescent (1873)
- Huge Leith Walk scheme (from Smiths Place to Brunswick Street.. the whole east side, plus all side streets: Lorne St/Halmyre St/Dalmeny St/Albert St stretching to Easter Road) (1873–96)
- Belgrave Crescent (1874)
- Douglas Crescent (1875)
- Coates Gardens (1875) even numbers
- Southfield House (1875)
- 54-62 Palmerston Place (1877)
- Completion of the Calton scheme at Hillside Crescent/Windsor Street/ Hillside Street/ Wellington Street/Brunton Place (1883–1896)

== George Heriot Trust Schools ==
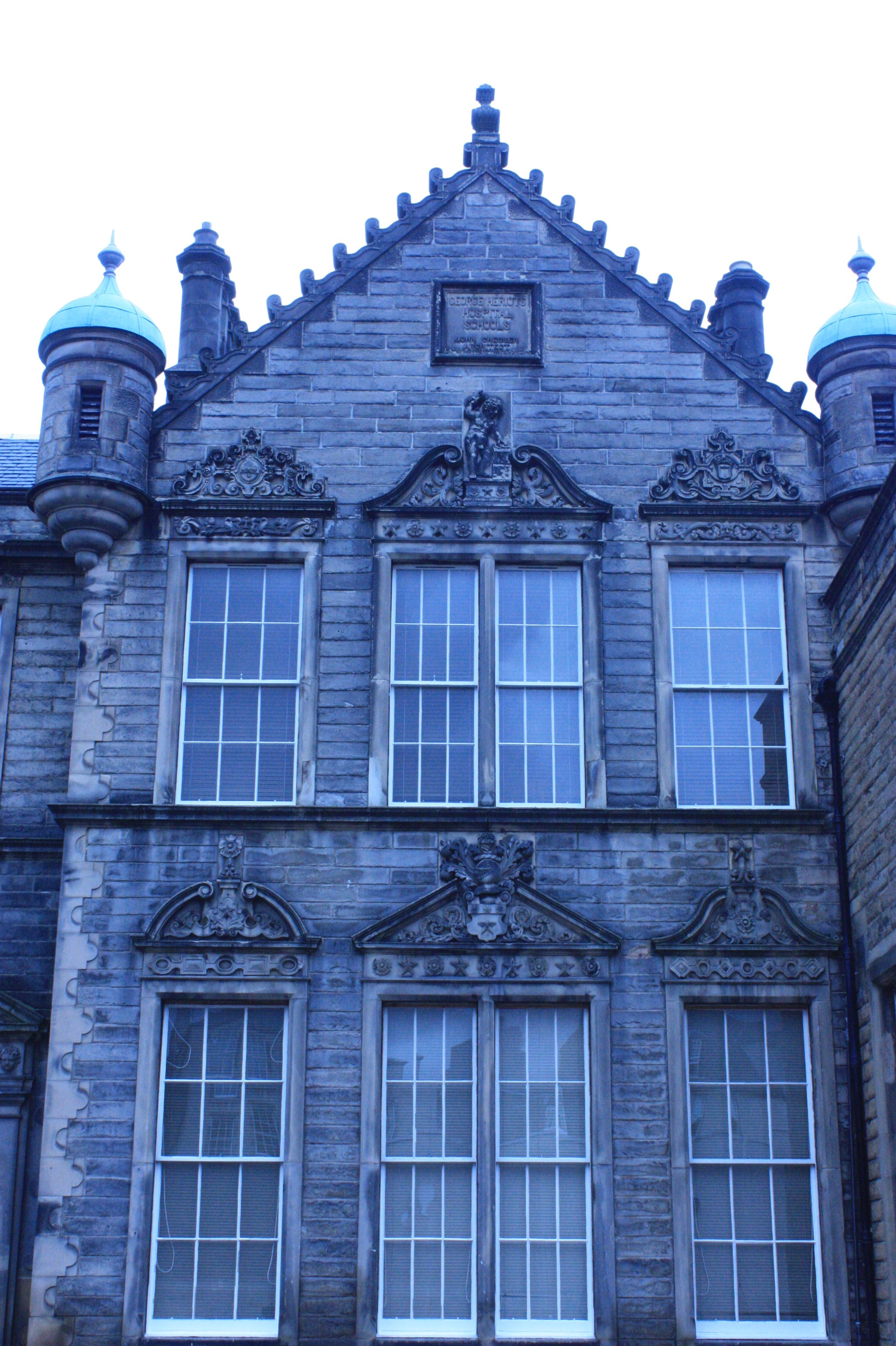
Davie Street School Edinburgh

These were all built on Trust land and using Trust monies. They all largely borrow architectural details from their mother school.

- Regent Road (Montrose Terrace) (1874)
- St Bernard’s Crescent (1874)
- Dean Street (1874)
