= The Luxury Institute =

The Luxury Institute is a premium goods and services research, training and consulting firm based in New York City, New York and Boca Raton, Florida. It has the largest global network of luxury experts. It has conducted more quantitative and qualitative research on affluent consumers than any other entity. Over the last 17 years, the firm has served over 1,100 luxury and premium goods and services brands. The Luxury Institute's reports, as well as CEO Milton Pedraza, have been cited in luxury industry articles by publications including Marketing Week, The Wall Street Journal, and Women's Wear Daily.

== Luxury Brand Status Index (LBSI) ==
The Luxury Institute publishes annual Luxury Brand Status Index surveys, which aggregate the brand preferences of high-net-worth individuals within various luxury market categories. In 2009, some available categories included:

- Business publications (US)
- Business websites (US)
- Champagne and Sparkling wines (US)
- Cognac (US)
- Consumer publications (US)
- Consumer websites (US)
- Gin (US)
- Handbags (US, Europe, Japan, China)
- Home appliances (US)
- Hotels (US)
- Jewelry (US)
- Liqueur (US)
- Men's fashion (US, China)
- Men's shoes (US, China)
- Retailers (US)
- Rum (US)
- Scotch (US)
- Table wines (US)
- Ultra luxury autos (US)
- Vodka (US)
- Wealth management firms (US)
- Whiskey (US)
- Women's fashion (US, Europe, Japan, China)
- Women's shoes (US, Europe, Japan, China)
