= George Fiddes Watt =

Scottish portrait painter and engraver (1873–1960)

- Born: 15 February 1873; Aberdeen, Scotland
- Died: 22 November 1960 (aged 87); Aberdeen, Scotland
- Education: Gray's School of Art; Royal Scottish Academy
- Known for: Portrait painting; engraving
- Notable work: H. H. Asquith; A. J. Balfour
- Elected: Royal Society of Arts

George Fiddes Watt (15 February 1873 – 22 November 1960) was a Scottish portrait painter and engraver.

== Life ==
Watt was born on 15 February 1873 in Aberdeen. He studied art at Gray's School of Art, Aberdeen and the Royal Scottish Academy, Edinburgh. He was elected to the Royal Society of Arts (RSA) in 1924 and received an honorary LL.D. degree from the University of Aberdeen in 1955.

Watt's work was exhibited at the Royal Academy from 1906 to 1930. His portrait of his mother is in the Tate Gallery's collection. Watt was sculpted by Henry Snell Gamley in 1912, Watt's son Albert having been sculpted by Gamley four years previously. A bronze statue of Watt by Thomas Bayliss Huxley-Jones, made in 1942, is in Aberdeen.

His third son, Alexander Stuart Watt (1909–1967) was a journalist based in Paris. Alastair Fiddes Watt (born 1954) is also a landscape painter. Watt died on 22 November 1960 in Aberdeen.

== Works ==
Watt's large output includes paintings of many famous people of his time in Britain. An exception among the many portraits is a landscape, J. P. Inverarity Mauled by a Lioness, Somaliland .

=== Portraits ===
Lawyers

- Viscount Haldane (Lincoln's Inn)
- Viscount Reading (Middle Temple)
- Alexander Low, Lord Low (The Laws)

Divines

- William Paterson Paterson

Scientists

- Sir J. J. Thomson (Royal Society)

Politicians

- H. H. Asquith
- A. J. Balfour (National Portrait Gallery)
- Edward Grey, 1st Viscount Grey of Fallodon
- Sir William Slater Brown, Lord Provost of Edinburgh

Academics

- Thomas Martin Lindsay

=== Mezzotint engravings ===
- Robert Bannatyne Finlay (Royal Courts of Justice)

== Bibliography ==
- Chamot, Mary; Farr, Dennis; Butlin, Martin. The Modern British Paintings, Drawings and Sculpture, London 1964, II.
- Sutherland, D.M. (2004–2011). "Fiddes Watt, Index no 101036779". Watt, (George) Fiddes (1873–1960), portrait painter. Oxford Dictionary of National Biography.
