= John William Chesser =

Scottish solicitor and politician (1862–1921)

John William Chesser SSC
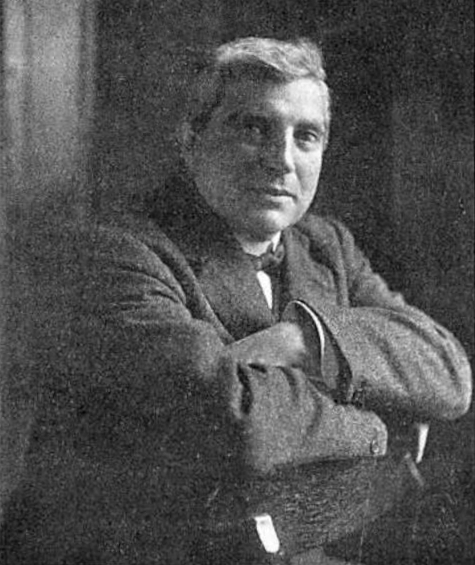

Lord Provost of Edinburgh
- In office 1919–1921
- Preceded by: John MacLeod
- Succeeded by: Thomas Hutchison

Personal details
- Born: 6 September 1862 Edinburgh, Scotland
- Died: 29 June 1921 (aged 58) Edinburgh, Scotland
- Party: Conservative
- Spouse: Dorothy Simm
- Parent: John Chesser (father)
- Education: University of Edinburgh
- Occupation: Solicitor

John William Chesser SSC (6 September 1862 – 29 June 1921) was a Scottish solicitor and Tory politician who served as Lord Provost of Edinburgh from 1919 to 1921.

The suburb of south-west Edinburgh known as Chesser was named after him.

== Early life ==
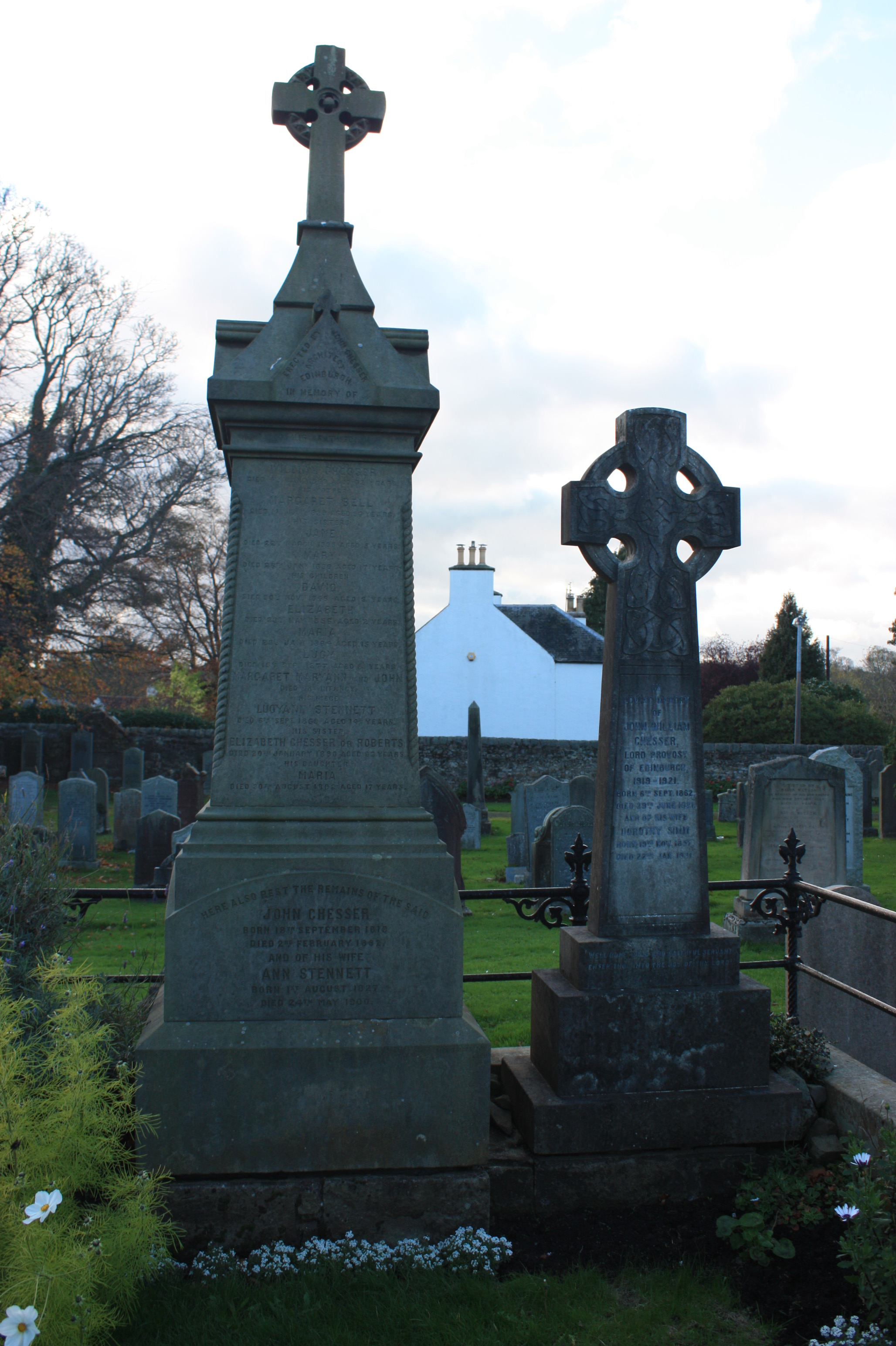
The grave of John William Chesser (right), Cramond churchyard

He was born on 6 September 1862 at 19 Graham Street off Lauriston Place in Edinburgh the son of Ann Stennett and her husband, John Chesser. The large Georgian house backed onto the Edinburgh Cattle Market. This relationship probably inspired his lifelong interest in cattle markets. He was educated at George Heriot's School 100m 100 metres (110 yd) from his home.

He studied law at the University of Edinburgh. In 1890 he was living as a lawyer at 1 Chalmers Crescent. He rose to be a Solicitor of the Supreme Court (SSC) in 1895.

== Career ==
In 1911 he was living at 14 North Park Terrace, a terraced house overlooking Inverleith playing fields, and had offices at 45 Frederick Street in the New Town.

In 1912 he was Convenor of the Edinburgh Markets and organised the building of the new slaughterhouses, markets and corn exchange in south-west Edinburgh.

In 1919 he was elected Lord Provost in succession to John Lorne MacLeod.

== Personal life ==
He married Dorothy Simm (1858–1931). They were parents to Ian Chesser.

== Death and legacy ==
He died in office on 29 June 1921. His post as Lord Provost was filled by Sir Thomas Hutchison. Chesser's death in office deprived him of the two usual honours of his final year in office: a portrait in his ceremonial robes and a knighthood which would have been scheduled for the 1922 New Year Honours.

He is buried next to his parents in Cramond churchyard.

Chesser's birthplace was renamed Keir Street in 1922 to avoid confusion with Graham Street in the newly absorbed Leith. It was demolished around 1970 to make room for an extension to Edinburgh College of Art.
