= Konin =

- City county
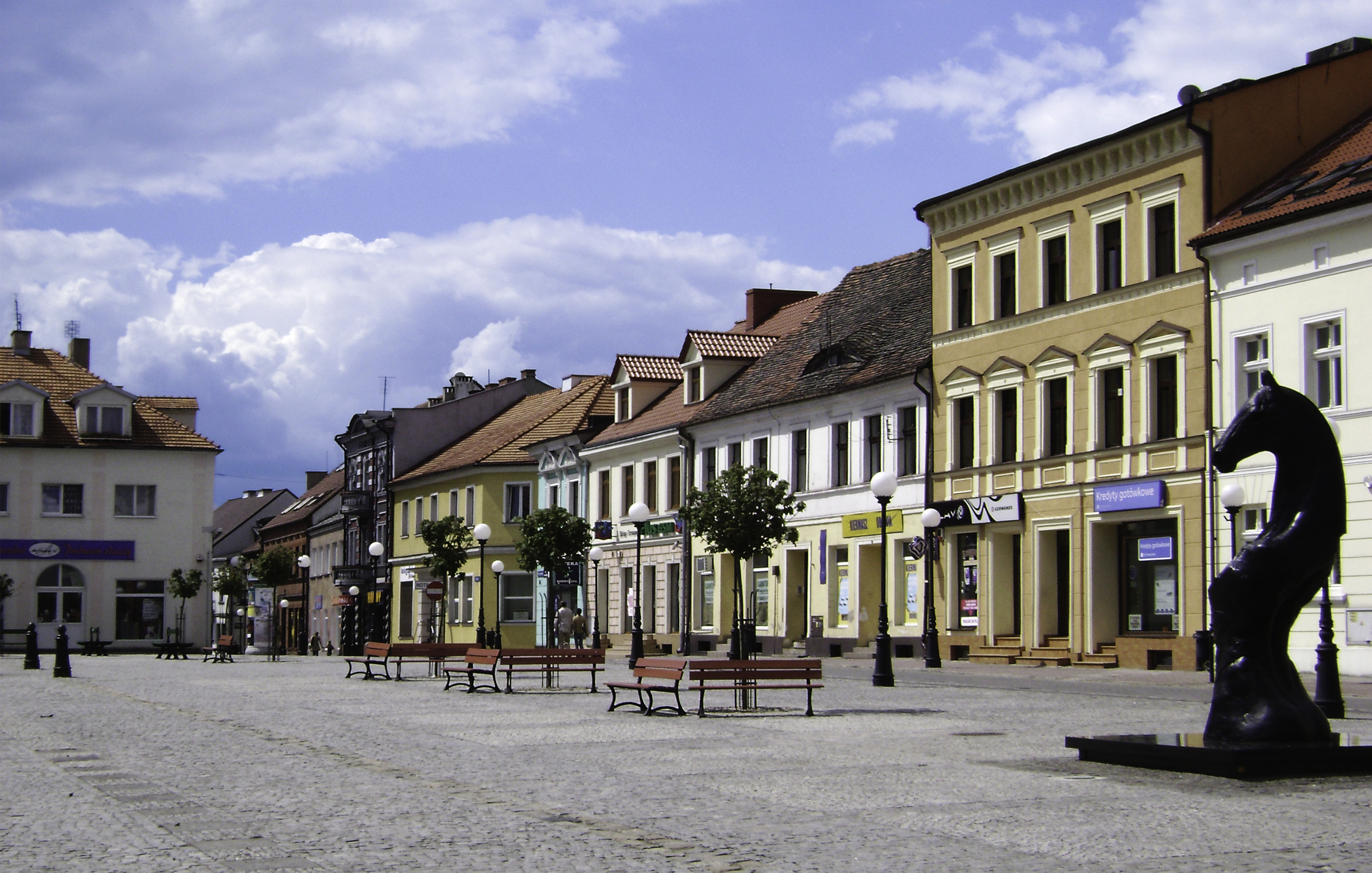
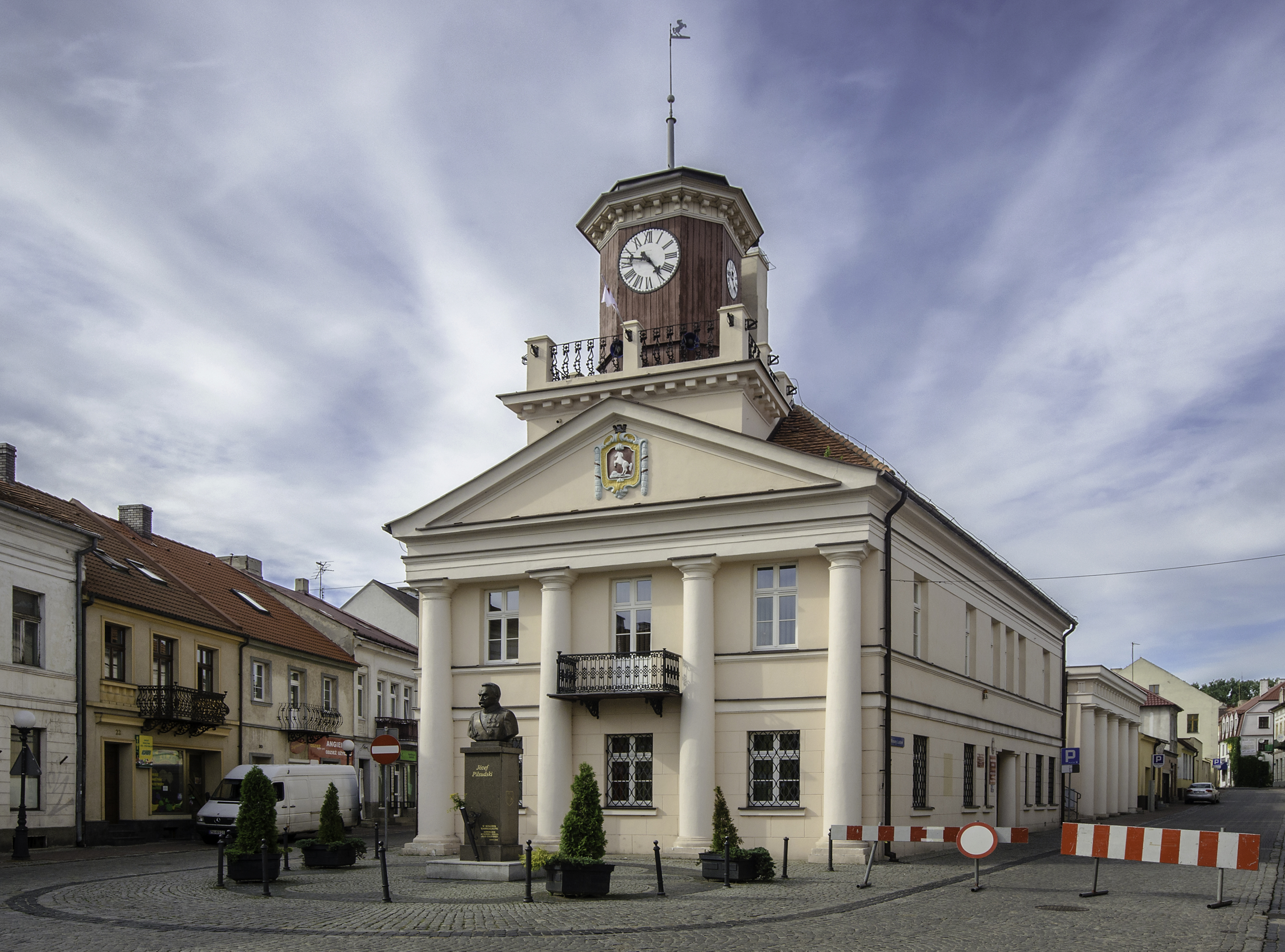
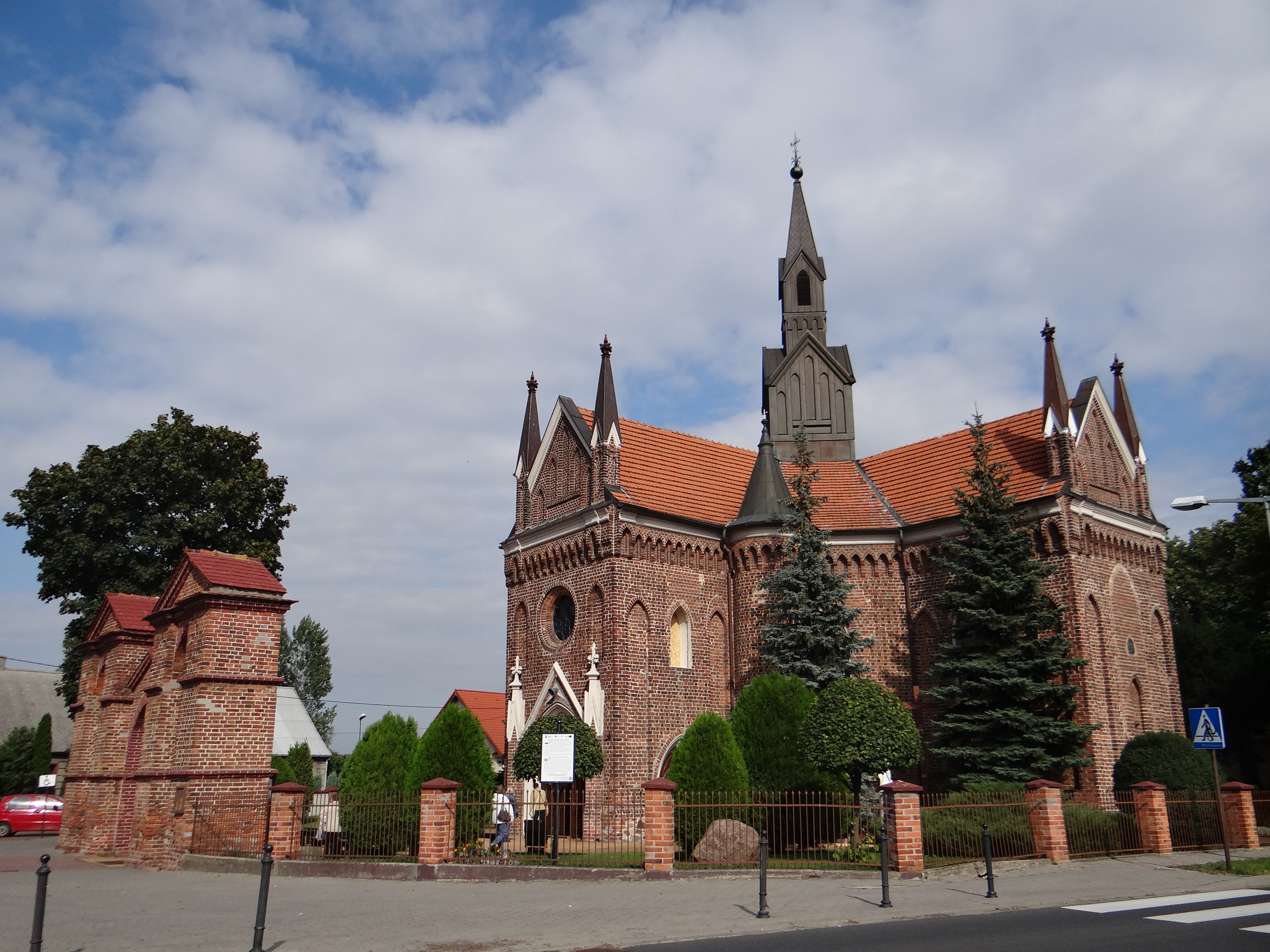
- Liberty Square Old town hall St. Andrew Church

- Flag Coat of arms

- Location within Poland
- Coordinates: 52°13′N 18°16′E
- Country: Poland
- Voivodeship: Greater Poland
- County: city county
- City rights: 1284

Government
  - City mayor: Piotr Karol Korytkowski (PO)

Area
  - Total: 82 km^{2} (32 sq mi)
- Elevation: 88 m (289 ft)

Population (31 December 2021)
  - Total: 71,427 ▼
- Time zone: UTC+1 (CET)
  - Summer (DST): UTC+2 (CEST)
- Postal code: 62-500 to 62-510
- Area code: +48 063
- Climate: Dfb
- Car plates: PKO, PN
- Website: http://www.konin.pl

Konin ([ˈkɔɲin]) is a city in central Poland, on the Warta River. It is the capital of Konin County and is located within the Greater Poland Voivodeship. In 2021 the population of the city was 71,427, making it the fourth-largest city in Greater Poland after Poznań, Kalisz and Piła.

Konin with over a thousand years of history is one of the oldest cities in Greater Poland. A former royal city of Poland, it attributed its early prosperity to clothmaking and trade, then in the 19th century it became an industrial center, and since the 20th century it has been the main city of the Konin Coal Basin. It was the site of several battles. From 1975 to 1999, it was the capital of the Konin Voivodeship. The Old Town of Konin contains a number of structures in Gothic, Renaissance, Baroque and Neoclassical styles, and a unique medieval road post, considered the oldest preserved road sign in Central and Eastern Europe and the oldest in Europe beyond the boundaries of the former Roman Empire. It is located on the main motorway and railway connecting Warsaw with Poznań and the German-Polish border.

== History ==
=== Prehistory ===
The earliest evidence of human habitation in Konin has been dated to the Paleolithic Era. On the dunes near the Warta, various ancient flint tools and implements have been found, among them being knives, burins, and tanged points. These earliest artifacts are of the Swiderian culture (Kultura Świderska) of 9000–8000 BC.

=== Ancient times ===
A permanent settlement arose along the Amber Road, which led from the Roman Empire to the Baltic Sea, traversing the area of present-day Konin. A map drawn by Ptolemy identified the settlement as Setidava (or Getidava), a probable spot to wade across the Warta and containing an emporium of some importance to merchants travelling along the route. The settlement's primary burial ground, situated on the dunes west of the centre of today's Konin, dates back to the Przeworsk culture (Kultura Przeworska) of the 2nd and 3rd centuries AD.

=== Middle Ages ===
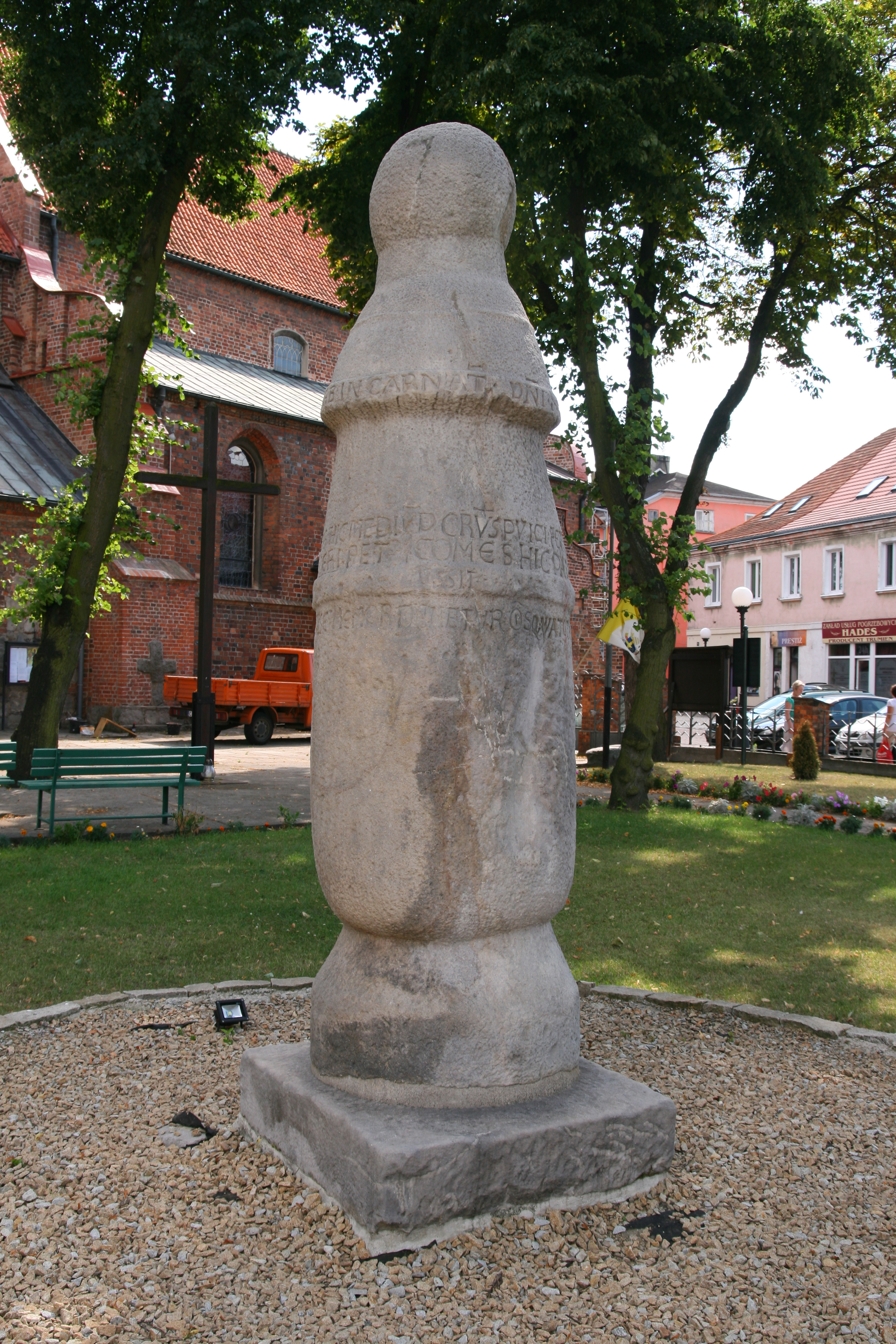
The Stone Signpost of Konin is the oldest European signpost beyond the boundaries of the former Roman Empire

Toward the end of the early Middle Ages, Gród Kaszuba was the most significant of the fortified settlements near present-day Konin. Inhabited from the 10th through 12th centuries, Gród Kaszuba was situated on the meadows near the Warta. Its abandonment was likely a consequence of floods which damaged its fortifications. The remains of Gród Kaszuba are visible on the south bank of the river.

During the 12th and 13th centuries, in the high to late Middle Ages, a complex of settlements was centred on the location of today's Stare Miasto, where there existed a large settlement named Konin and a market place and a church built of sandstone. (The name Stare Miasto first appeared in use later, after Konin had been reestablished elsewhere.) What remains from that time is SS Peter and Paul's Parish Church, with its magnificent carved portal and a solar clock on the south wall, perhaps the oldest solar clock in Greater Poland. In 1331, the settlement was plundered and burnt by the Teutonic Knights. What remained was soon abandoned and the town of Konin was reestablished, six kilometres (3.7 miles) to the northeast, in the more defensible spot where the Old Town of Konin is situated today.

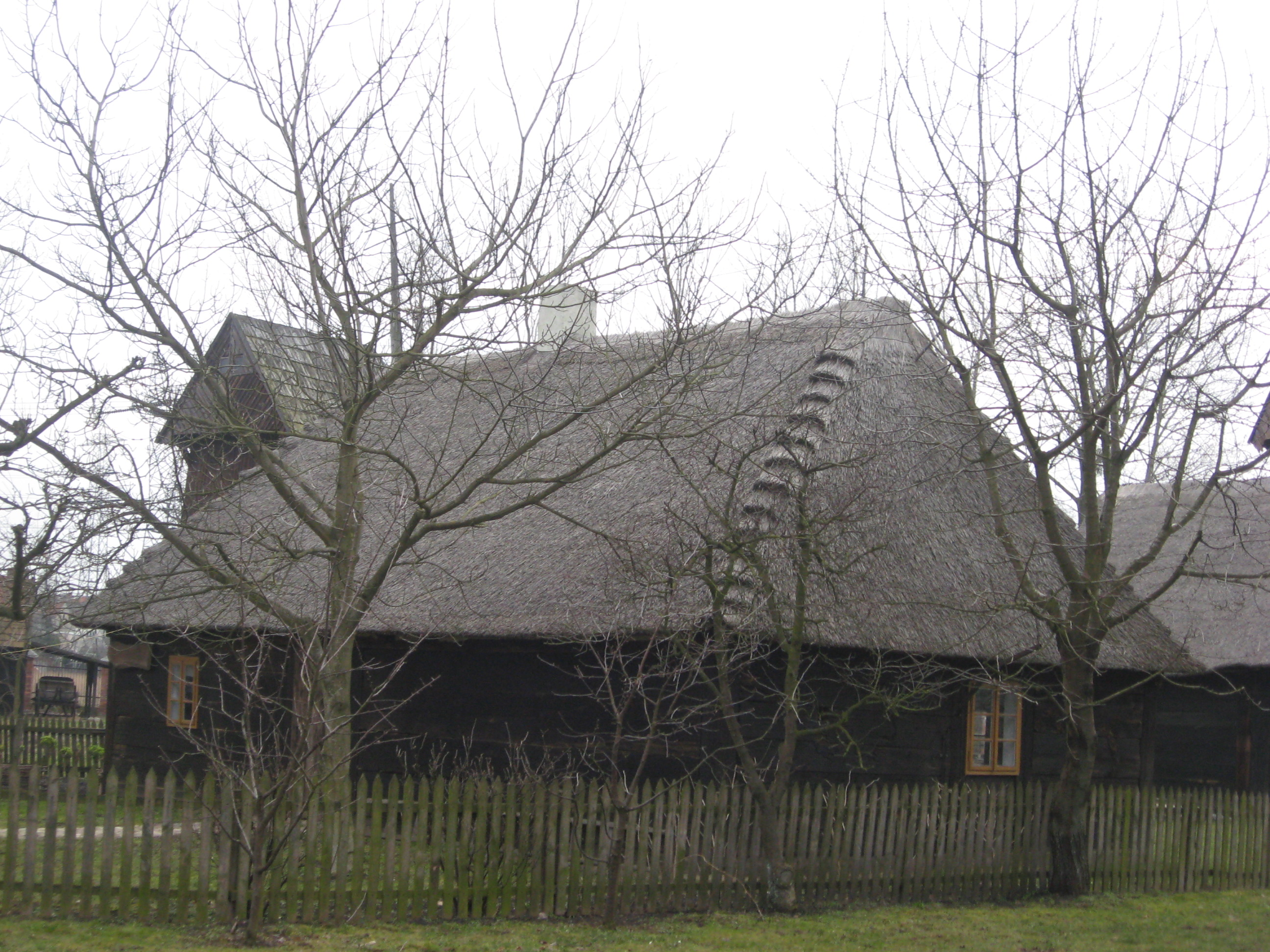
Gosławice district: Rural architecture, reflected in an open-air museum

Since the 13th century, Konin has been situated on the marshy grounds of an island within a ford of the Warta River. The oldest available written work confirming the location of the town is associated with Gosław, the chief officer of a group of settlers, and was recorded in 1293. The town may have been chartered by the Duke of Greater Poland, Przemysł II, who visited Konin in 1284 and 1292. At that time, the town's north–south axis equalled 430 meters, while its east–west axis equalled 210 meters. Also, the town's area was eight hectares, and its circumference was 1100 meters. By the standards of the time, Konin was a town of medium size.

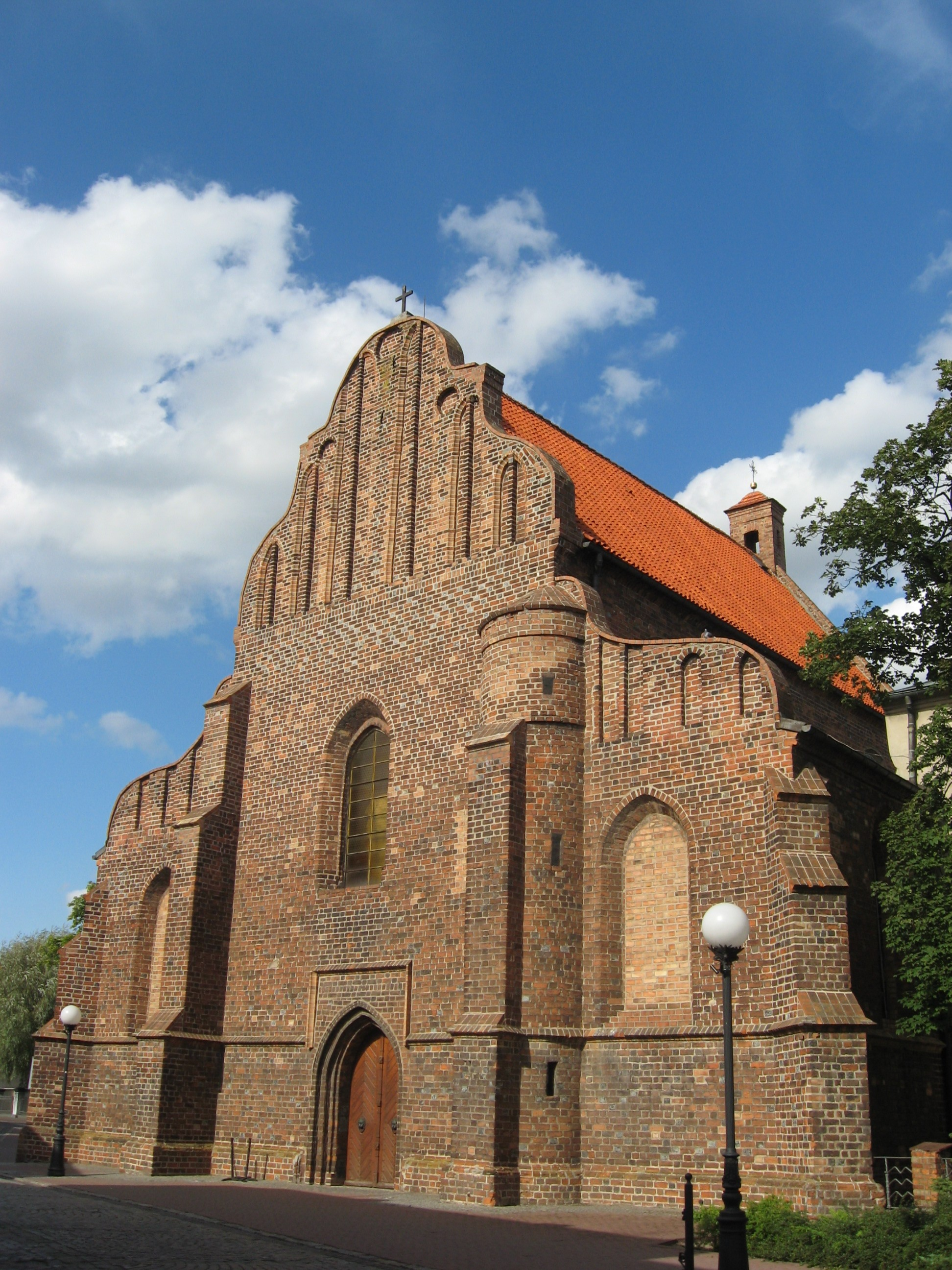
Romanesque-Gothic St Bartholomew's Church

Konin's significance grew during the 14th century. Records from that era indicate that Konin possessed a Castellan, an office of significance in feudal Poland, and one which only the oldest towns in the country were granted. At approximately the midpoint of the century, Konin became the judicial seat of the Kalisz Voivodeship and functioned under the authority of a Starost. There may have also been a school in Konin at the time, as a student from Konin is listed in a 14th-century record of the Charles University in Prague.

The second half of the 14th century and the entire 15th are believed to have been a period of rapid development for Konin. During the reign of the Polish King Casimir III the Great (1310–1370), a king's castle was erected in Konin and the town was encircled with walls and a moat, marking the beginning of Konin as a king's town Later, King Władysław II Jagiełło (1351/52 - 1434) was a guest of Konin, visiting in the years of 1403, 1425, and 1433. (Władysław engineered a historic debilitation of the political and military power of the Teutonic Knights by means of his Polish-Lithuanian victory at the Battle of Grunwald in 1410.) His last stay at Konin, in 1433, was his longest. Throughout that year's summer, he resided in the town's castle, obtaining reports on a Polish retaliatory strike against the Knights.

In 1458, during the Thirteen Years' War (1454–66) against the Teutonic Order, there was a call for military recruitment throughout Poland. Every Polish town was bound to put up a number of soldiers, the number of which was a sign of the size and power of a given town. With regard to Konin, it was 15 infantrymen; by comparison, Poznań, the capital of Greater Poland, was bound to put up 60, while Kalisz, nearby Słupca and Kłodawa, and Koło were to provide 30, 20, 20, and 15 men, respectively. These quantities suggest that Konin was still a town of medium size. Notwithstanding, the town continued its development of handicraft trades and enlarged the area of its Starosty District. In 1425, Konin was granted a charter to conduct two fairs each year.

=== Renaissance ===
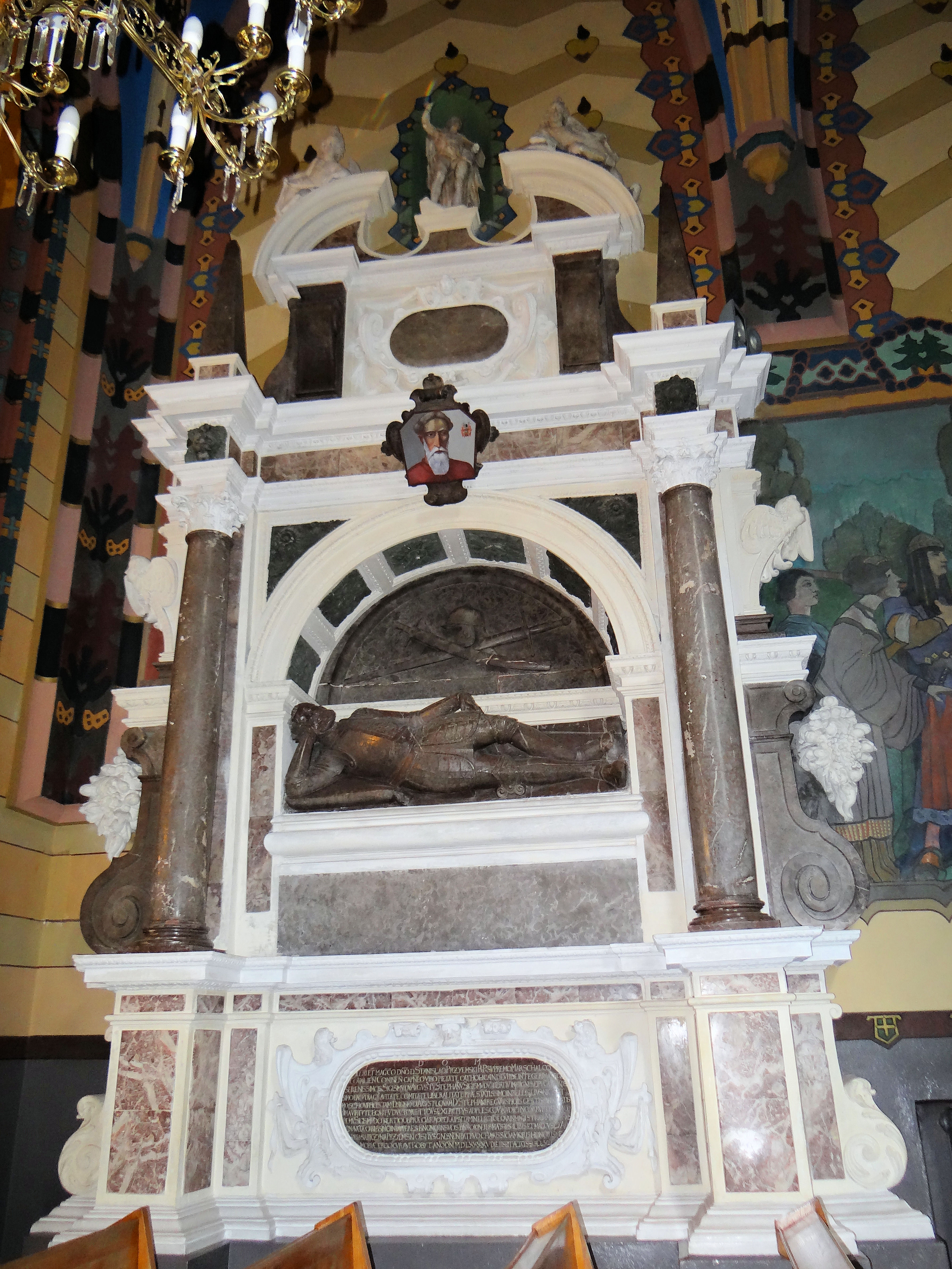
Mannerist tombstone of Grand Marshal of the Polish Crown Stanisław Przyjemski in the St. Bartholomew's Church

The 16th century, the period of Poland's golden age, was a time of significant economic, political, military, cultural, and territorial growth. In 1504, the village of Kurów, located on the river bank opposite the main body of Konin, was incorporated into the town. Furthermore, a description of the town, written in 1557, lists a brickyard and a mill as well as eight butchers, 14 bakers, 21 shoemakers, and four fishermen. However, Konin may have been one of the smaller towns of the time in eastern Greater Poland, based on its "Szos", the tax assessed on its earnings and the possessions of its townspeople. Konin was obliged to pay 32 zlotych, while Poznań (the capital of Greater Poland) was assessed 1400 zlotych; Kalisz, 230; nearby Słupca, 96; and both Koło and Pyzdry, 64.

Concerning religious matters and the Reformation, the starost of Konin, Jakub Ostroróg, was a notable supporter of the Protestants, and a local parish-priest, Stanisław Lutomirski, played a role in the Reformation in the region surrounding Konin.

=== 17th century ===
During the 17th century, epidemics and war greatly afflicted Konin. A plague of three years' length (1628-1631) decimated the town's population. Subsequent efforts to revitalize Konin included King Władysław IV's 1646 proclamation, confirming the town's right to conduct two fairs annually and promoting participation in those events by offering military protection to merchants who attended them, and a 1652 edict of the Starost, licensing the Scottish community of Konin to erect breweries. Thereafter, the town was invaded and occupied by the Swedish Army in 1656 during the Second Northern War (The Deluge), suffering extensive damage (see Castles and Ancient town walls) and a reduction in the number of its houses, from 127 prior to the war to 25 in 1659. By war's end, the town's population had been reduced to not more than 200 persons. Another plague occurred shortly afterwards, in 1662.

=== 18th century ===
Map of the town of Konin and its surroundings (around 1790)

The 18th century began with the turmoil of the Great Northern War, during which Konin was so severely devastated, in 1707, that its restoration required the remainder of the century to complete. The second half of the century was a time of advanced crisis for the nation, as an irreversible decline of the Polish–Lithuanian Commonwealth culminated in the Partitions of Poland and the loss of national independence. Poland's territory was occupied and divided among three bordering countries - Russia, Prussia, and Austria - in three stages, occurring in the years of 1772, 1793 and 1795.

As a consequence of the second partition, Konin was incorporated into Prussia, ending Konin's status as a royal town. At the time, the town's population was 780, with 165 houses, of which only one was made of brick. Inhabitants earned their living in agriculture and handicrafts. Among craftsmen, there were 22 shoemakers, 13 potters, and eight furriers. Eight fairs took place each year, together with a round-up of cattle. Poles, Jews, Germans and Scots were the town's four main ethnic groups. In 1794, Konin joined the first Polish insurrection, the Kościuszko Uprising; the act of joining is recorded in the town's books of that period. Polish insurgents also took control of the town multiple times - e.g., in September 1794, when the town was entered by the soldiers of the corps of Jan Henryk Dąbrowski, the namesake of the Polish national anthem - the so-called "Dąbrowski's Mazurka". In 1796, the town was damaged by fire.

=== 19th century ===
The 19th century began with the general, European disorder of the Napoleonic Wars, which neither eastern Greater Poland nor Konin escaped. At the start of the century, the Duchy of Warsaw was created as a Polish formally independent state, de facto dependent upon Napoleon I Bonaparte. The Napoleonic Wars gave Poles hope of regaining national independence, and they strongly supported Napoleon. On November 9, 1806, Poles took control of Konin and quickly organized a new, town government. The following year, the town was formally incorporated into the Duchy of Warsaw.

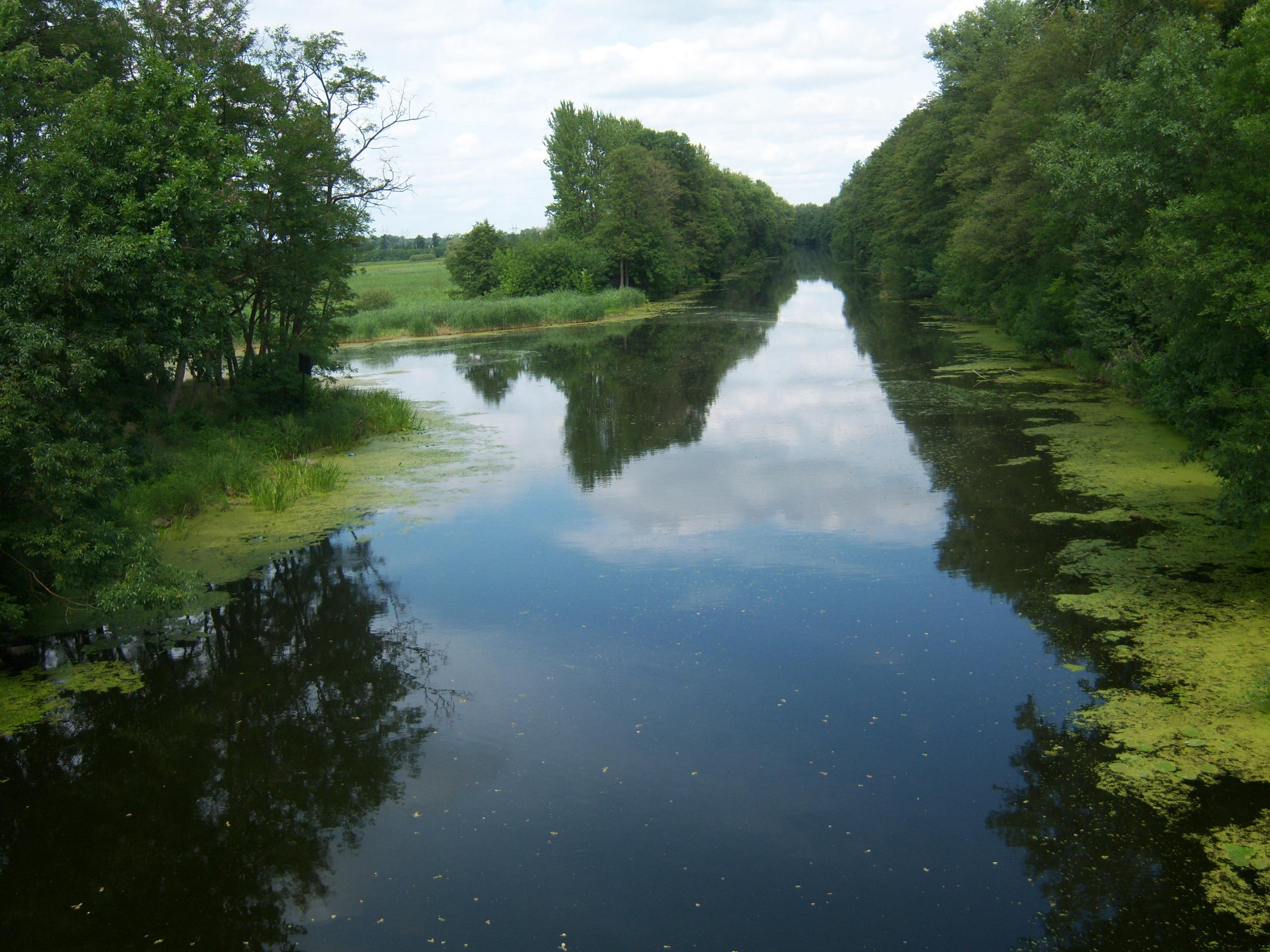
Warta-Gopło Canal

The subsequent collapse of the Napoleonic Empire resulted in the establishment of a new order in Europe, as well as within the Polish territories, including Konin. The Congress of Vienna, assembled in 1814–1815 to arrange political changes on the continent, awarded Russia the majority of territories formerly held by the Polish–Lithuanian Commonwealth. Konin itself was incorporated into Russia as a part of Congress Poland (formally the Kingdom of Poland), a pseudo-autonomous region that was a Russian dependency and which recognized the tzar as its ruler. The town was also designated as the capital of a sector within the Kalisz Governorate; the sector encompassed two counties, Konin County and Pyzdry County. From an administrative standpoint, Konin's sector constituted the westernmost territory of the Russian state.

The November Uprising erupted in 1830. Although Konin was not directly involved in this Polish uprising, as with other Polish cities and towns it suffered the political and cultural consequences of its failure. Those consequences included the denial of higher offices to Poles, the elimination of Polish as the official language, and the systematic russification of the primary and secondary schools.

The January Uprising of 1863 had a greater effect on Konin than had the 1830 rebellion. As many as several dozen battles and skirmishes took place in and near Konin, to which many present-day monuments attest.

From 1815 onwards, trade and handicraft activities increased substantially in Konin. A description of the town, from 1820, states that among the 2,456 inhabitants, there were 161 craftsmen, ten merchants, and 42 peasants. During the course of the century the population of Konin increased steadily, rising from 4,195 people in 1850 to 7,391 in 1896. In comparison, nearby Koło had an 1896 population of 8,800 inhabitants, while Turek's population that same year was 9,900. However, while nearby Łódź was becoming one of the most significant textile industrial centres in the world, only 12 cloth workshops and small factories existed in Konin in 1820.

During the 1830s, a general renewal of the town led to the construction of new streets and squares. Also, building lots were developed for industrial expansion, and dilapidated buildings were demolished.

By the end of the century, there were two factories that produced machines and special tools for agriculture - the larger of them belonged to L. Reymond, a citizen of Switzerland, who settled permanently in Konin. His factory was equipped with a 12 horse-power steam engine and a cast iron foundry. Apart from these enterprises, the town held 18 windmills, four tanneries, four workshops producing soap, three vinegar factories, two small factories producing boilers, two breweries, two oil-mills, a sparkling water factory, and a distillery.

=== 20th century ===
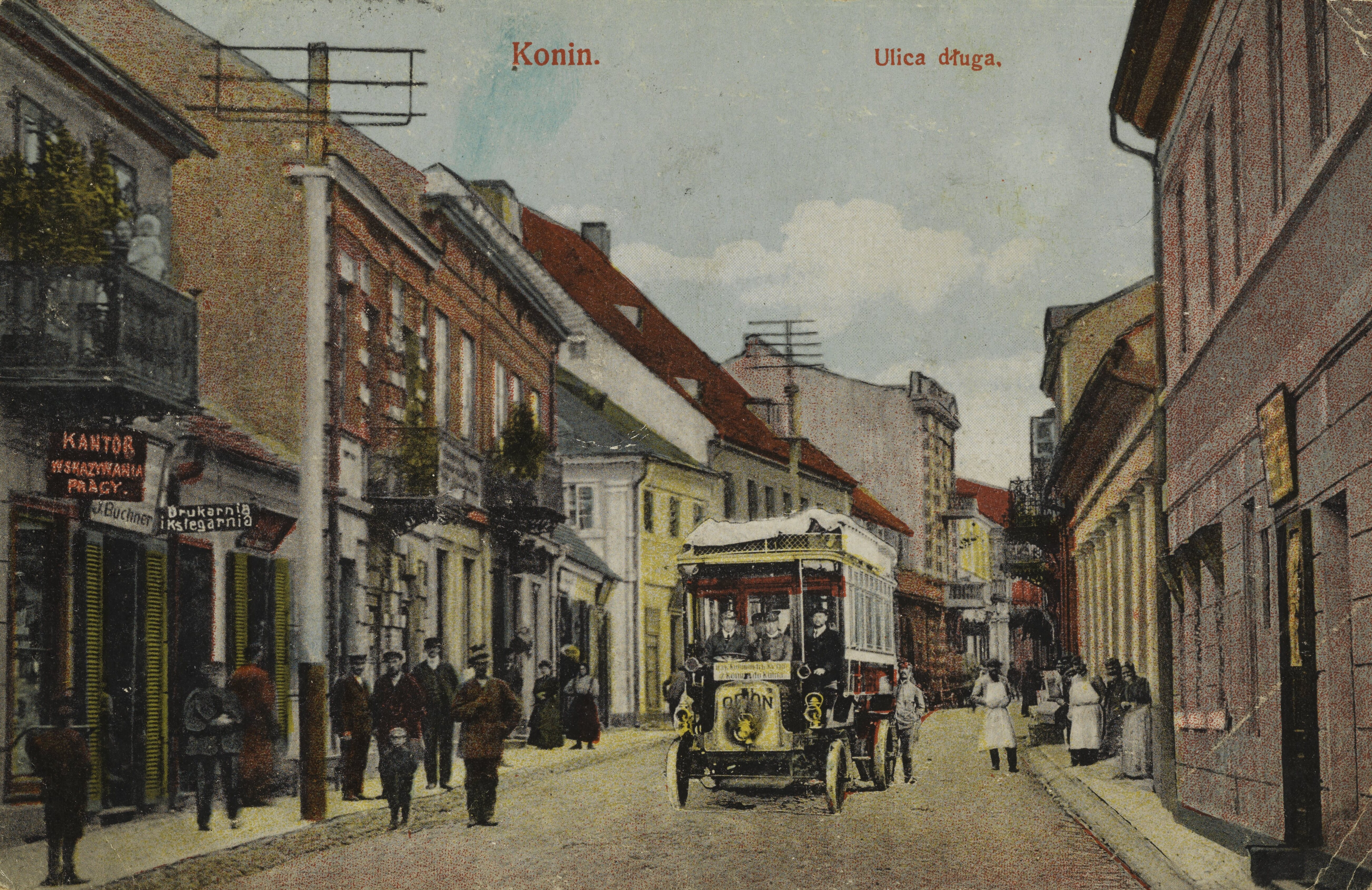
Konin, c. 1915

For Konin, the early 20th century was a period of rapid development in the fields of culture, education, and social life. The Musical Society of Kalisz (Towarzystwo Muzyczne w Kaliszu) had as many as 72 members in Konin, and Konin's Jewish Library was one of the finest within the Gubernya of Kalisz, with a number of books and a general readership that significantly exceeded similar libraries in Kalisz, a much larger urban area. Also, a branch of the Rowing Club of Kalisz (Kaliskie Towarzystwo Wioślarskie) was founded in Konin in 1908 and, by 1914, had 95 members. Its building, displaying the club's coat of arms, still stands in Old Konin, in Zofii Urbanowskiej Street.

Workers' associations were also established in Konin. In 1905, when significant strikes occurred in Polish industrial centres such as Warsaw and Łódź, there were some minor strikes and turmoil in Konin as well.

A branch of the Polish gymnastic society Sokół, was founded in Konin. A quasi-military association, its objective was to maintain the fitness of teenagers, to improve their health, and to provide for readily trainable military recruits in the event of a possible national uprising or a defence need. Similar Jewish and German associations also existed.

After the outbreak of World War I in 1914, battles between Russian and German troops occurred near Konin. Ultimately, the city came under German occupation and deteriorated. In November 1918, when Poland regained independence, the German Landsturm opened fire on members of the Polish Military Organisation and Polish scouts and students, who tried to liberate the city. The Germans also threw grenades at local inhabitants who gathered at the local Market Square, killing six people and wounding many. Nevertheless, Konin was soon reintegrated with the reborn Polish state. The economic situation of the town did not improve. Living conditions of residents were still miserable, exacerbated by the lack of functioning water distribution and sewer systems. The subsequent inter-war economic crisis was harsh, and conditions did not begin to improve until the désenclavement of the town, attributable to the opening of a major railway, between Poznań and Warsaw, and the construction of a canal to Gopło Lake. Jews represented 30% of Konin's population in the 1930s.

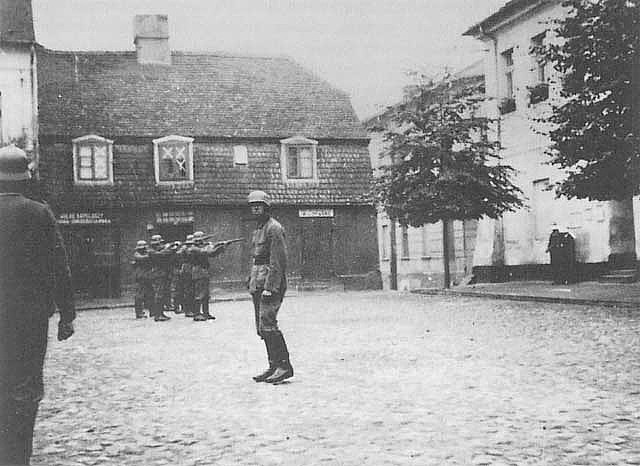
German soldiers executing Polish hostages in Konin in 1939

During the Second World War, Konin was part of the land annexed by Nazi Germany (Reichsgau Wartheland). During the German occupation, mass murders of Poles were committed by the Germans at the local Jewish cemetery in November 1939 and in the spring of 1940, in which 94 people were killed, some as part of the German Intelligenzaktion and some as punishment for their involvement in the defense of Poland during the German invasion of Poland of September 1939. The Germans established and operated a Nazi prison in the city, and two forced labour camps for Jews. Poles were also subjected to expulsions to the so-called General Government, carried out in late 1939 and in 1940, which especially pertained to owners of more well-kept houses, shops and workshops, which were then handed over to German colonists as part of the Lebensraum policy. Three Polish men from Konin were also murdered by the Soviets in the large Katyn massacre committed in April–May 1940. In the town's surrounding forests, the Nazis carried out mass executions of Jews, 95% of which were killed or sent to concentration camps. In August 1943, the Jews at the labour camp at Konin, led by Rabbi Joshua Moshe Aaronson, burned down the huts in the camp and tried to escape. Almost all of them were killed.

== Jewish community of Konin ==
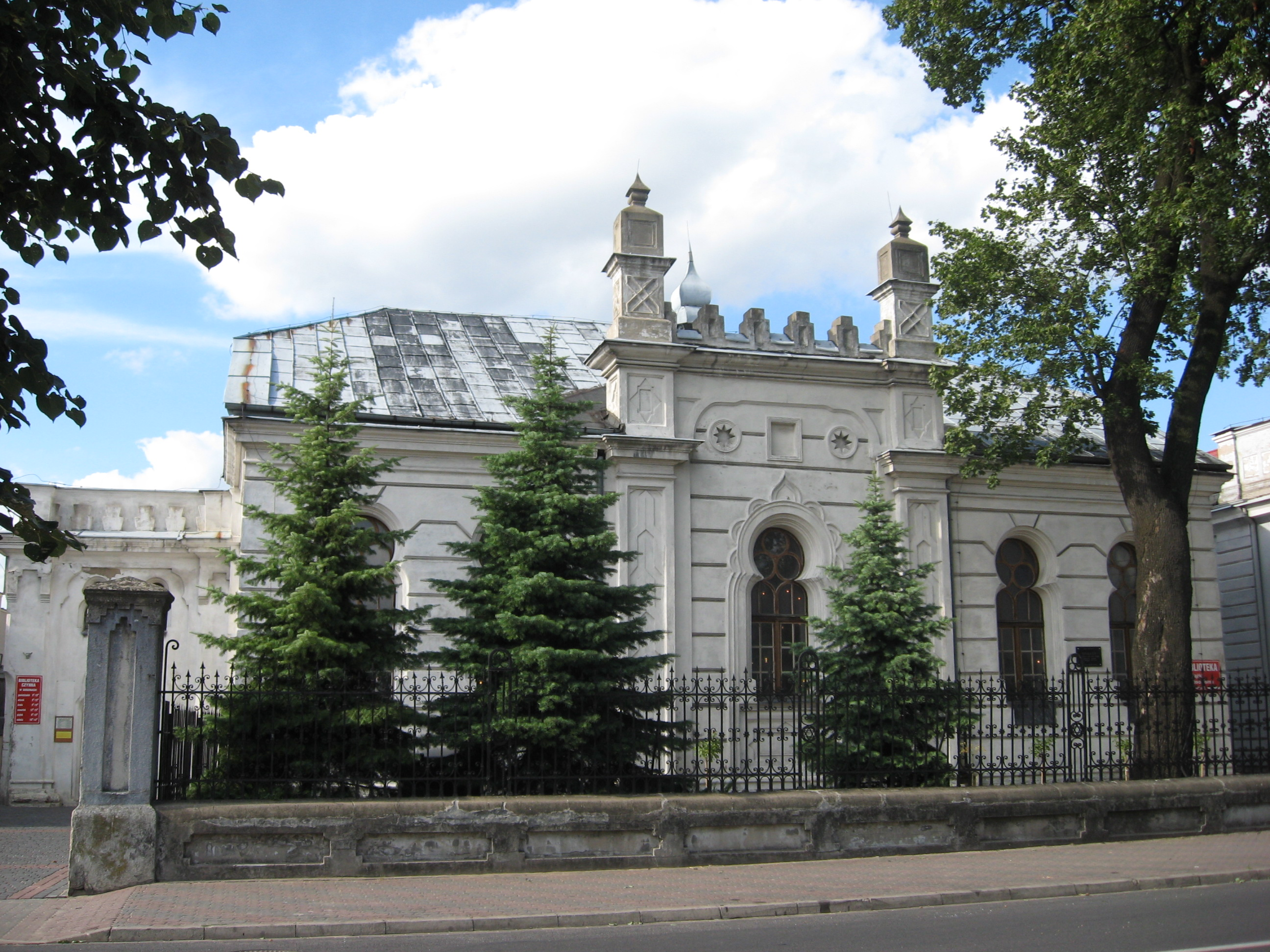
Konin Synagogue

The first written evidence of Jews settling in Konin dates to 1397. In the 15th century, 180 Jews were counted in the city. Over the course of the 17th century, the number of Jews in the city shrank as a result of fires, plagues, and restrictions upon Jewish residency. Administratively, the Jews of Konin were subordinate to the larger community in nearby Kalisz until the end of the 18th century.

A wooden synagogue was built in 1763–1766. The current standing building was built in 1829. The first rabbi in Konin was Rabbi Amsterdam, between 1810 and 1849.

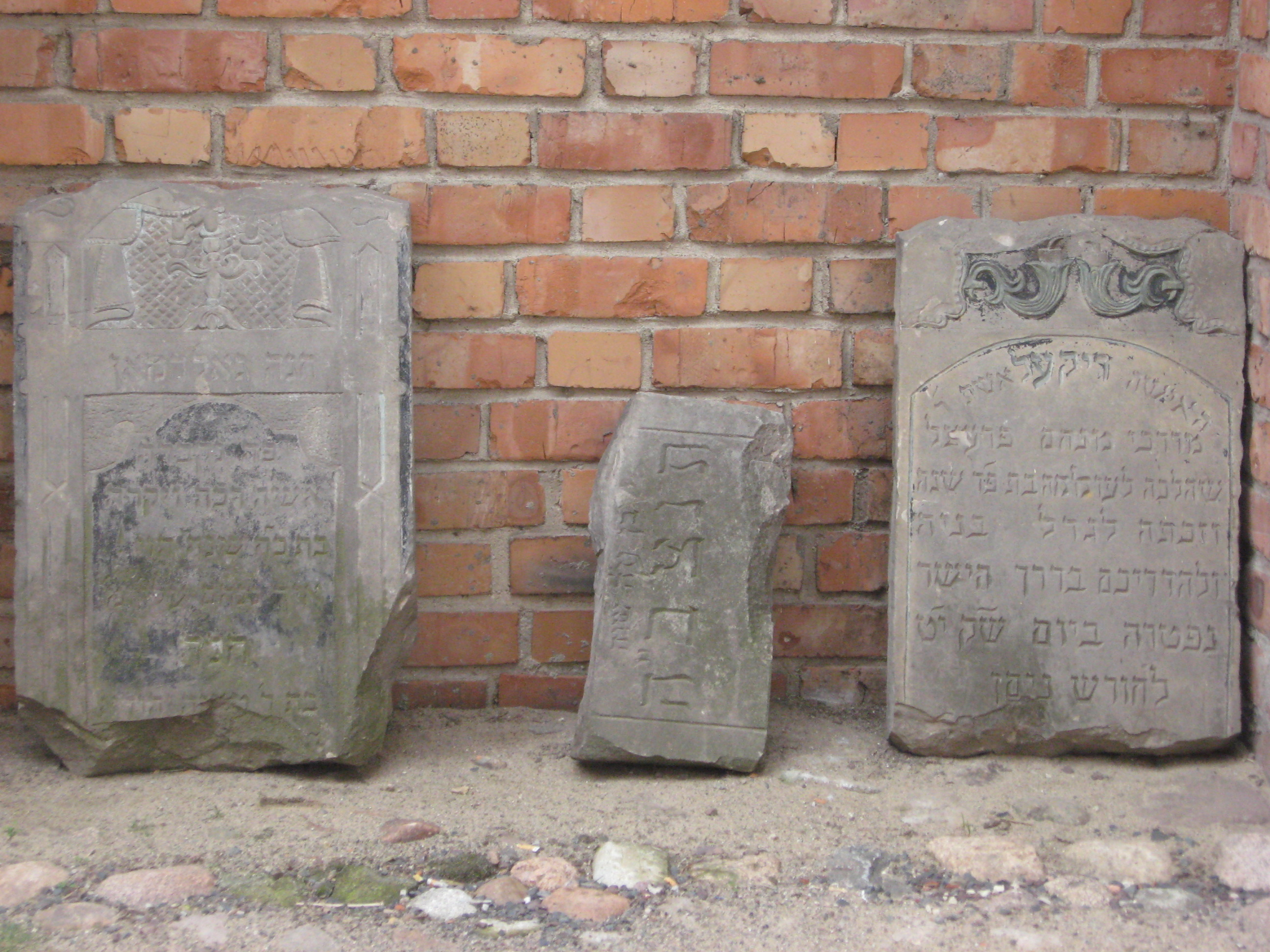
Remains of Jewish tombstones

Between the two world wars, some 3,000 Jews lived in the city, constituting roughly a quarter of its residents. In 1918, the first Jewish gymnasium was established. The community had a beit midrash, mikvaot, synagogues, a few prayer halls (such as "Hevra Tehilim"), active youth movements, a library, a Jewish elementary school and a Jewish high school. During this period, movements such as Agudat Yisrael, Beitar, and other Zionist parties, and the Bund were active there. The majority of Jews in Konin were Mitnagdim, though two small communities of Hasidim lived within the Konin Jewish community, mostly adherents of Gerer Hasidism, with a small group of Aleksander Hasidim.

The Germans occupied Konin in September 1939 and shortly after the area was incorporated into the Reich as part of the Warthegau. In late 1939, about 1000 of the town's Jews were deported to a settlement near Radom. The Germans confined the remainder of the Jews to a ghetto in 1940 and their former residences were given to German officials and ethnic Germans who came from the east. Later in the year, groups of Konin's Jews were deported to other ghettos, being allowed to take only a few items with them. By the end of 1940, almost all had been deported. In November 1941, some Konin Jews were part of the 3000 Jews murdered by the German SS in the forests of Kaziemesh (Kleczew), north of the city. Out of 6000 Jewish people living in the city before the German occupation perhaps 200 survived the war and 46 returned to Konin. None of them continued living in Konin due to the hostility of the non-Jewish population.

The town survivors published, in 1968, an extensive Yizkor (memorial) book (803 pages) in memory of the flourishing Jewish community. The book was written in Yiddish, Hebrew and English.

A descendant of Konin Jews, Theo Richmond, wrote Konin: A Quest, the most extensive history of Jewish life in the town to appear in English. The book won the Jewish Quarterly-Wingate Prize in 1996.

== Castles ==
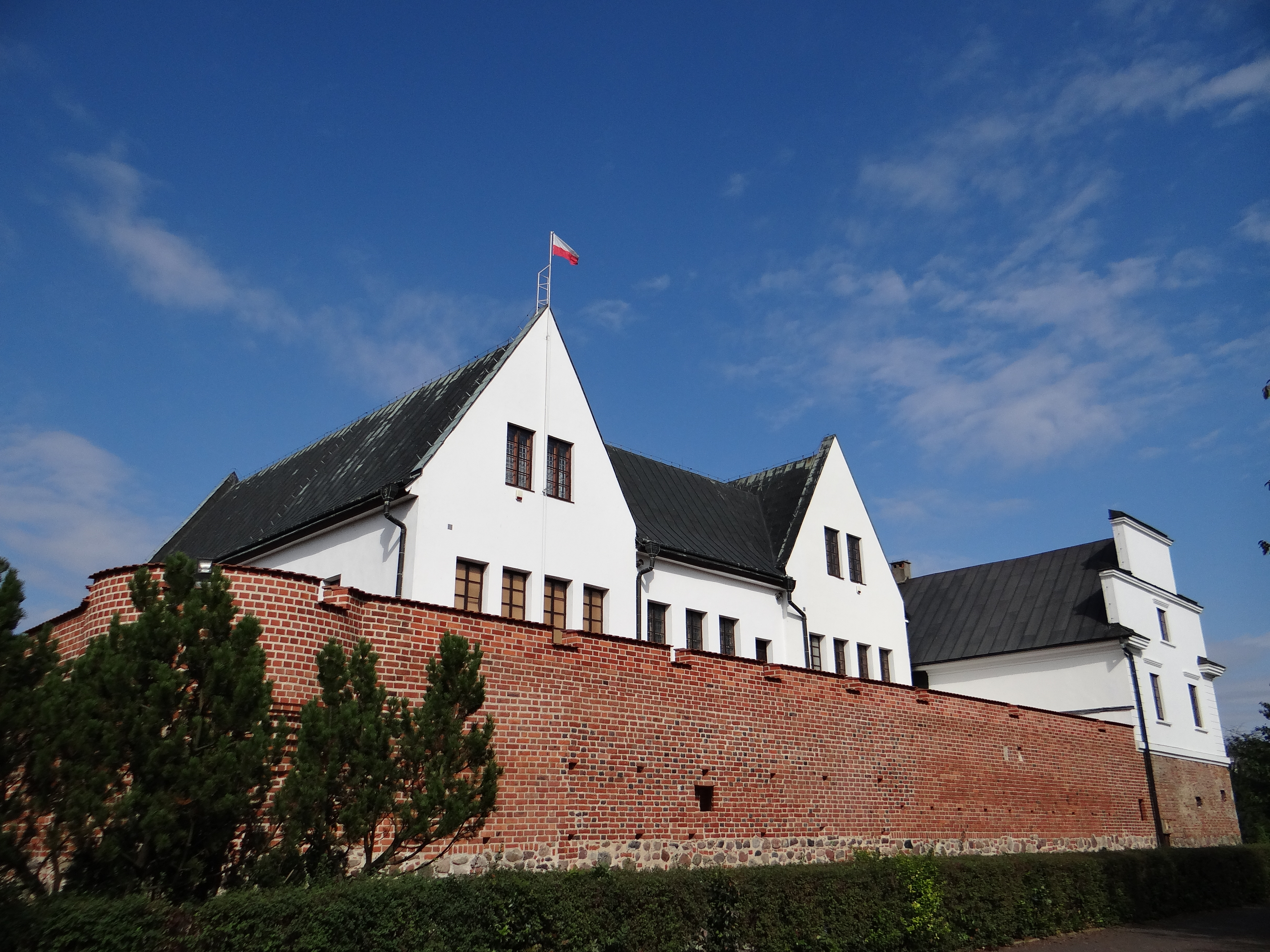
15th-century medieval castle in the Gosławice district

The 14th-century castle, built of brick with some details made of sandstone (probably taken from the nearby quarry of Brzeźno village), had a perimeter in the shape of a regular quadrangle. The main buildings were massive, with an octagonal watchtower in the southeast corner of the compound and a kind of great hall on its western side. The castle was also encircled with a double wall and a moat. During the Deluge of the 17th century, it was partially damaged by the Swedish army and abandoned to slow decay. The derelict structure was demolished during the 19th century, with its larger sections being removed about 1844–1855). Today, there are no remains of the castle itself. Castle Square (Plac Zamkowy) is located in approximately the spot where the castle had stood. Another castle, erected during the 15th century in the former Gosławice village, now Konin's Gosławice district, was restored during the 1980s.

== Ancient town walls ==
The construction of the town walls started, as in the case of the castle, in the second half of the 14th century. They encircled the town as a defence line, especially on the settlement's southern and eastern sides and partially on the western. The line of walls, however, never entirely formed a closed circuit, as the Warta River and its nearby marshy grounds, bogs, earthworks, and retrenchments provided adequate protection in the gaps. On the north side of town, the Toruńska Gatehouse (Brama Toruńska) sat just in front of the river crossing, while the south side was guarded from the Kaliska Gatehouse (Brama Kaliska); both gatehouses were named for towns that were primary destinations for merchants travelling through Konin.

The walls were reinforced by a series of rectangular towers that projected from the walls, creating a bastion-like structure. The towers themselves, each consisting of three walls, were open to the side that faced the town. These fortifications were seriously damaged during the Deluge, especially in the 1656 siege of Konin. They were never repaired afterwards, so at the turn of the 18th century the town's authorities chose to have them deconstructed or demolished if necessary. Their last conspicuous elements were removed sometime after 1816, and today there are no remains.

== Architectural landmarks ==
Konin County (Powiat Koniński) contains examples of the following architectural forms: Romanesque, Gothic, Renaissance, Mannerist, Baroque, and Rococo; 18th century Classicism; 19th century Neo-Gothic, Neoromanesque, Neoclassicism, and Eclecticism; and 20th century Modernism, Nazi architecture, Socialist Realism, and Postmodernism. Also near Konin are the remains of the reinforced concrete bunkers employed by Poland's Armia Poznań during World War II.

Architecturally, the city of Konin is divided into two historical parts - Old Town (Stary Konin), situated on the south bank of the Warta; and New Konin (Nowy Konin), spreading northward from the river and developed primarily after 1945.

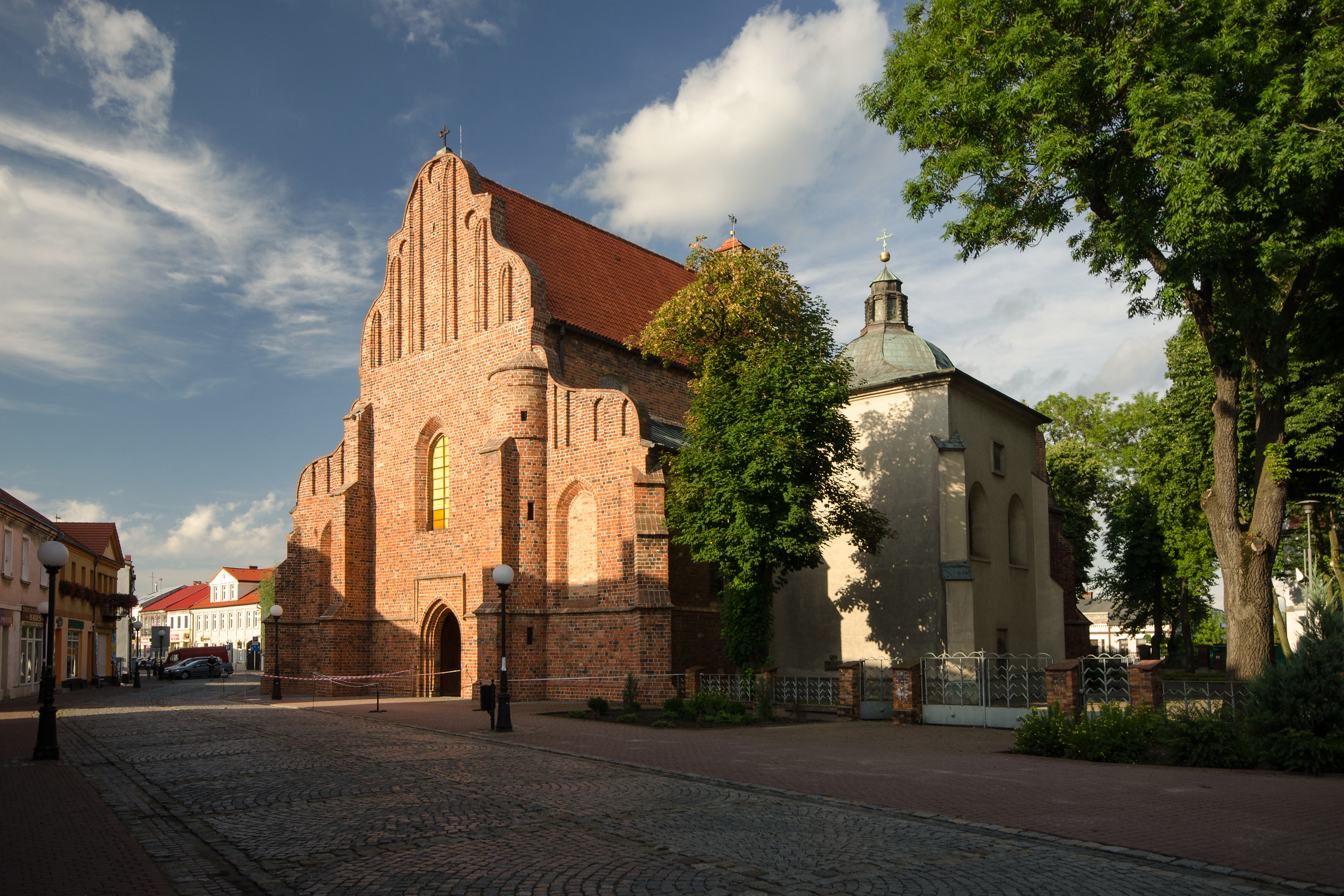
St. Bartholomew's Church

- Romanesque
  - The Stone Signpost of Konin is the oldest European signpost beyond the boundaries of the Roman Empire. Made of local sandstone from the quarry near Brzeźno, it was commissioned in 1151 AD by either Duke Piotr Włost Włostowicz or Piotr Stary Wszeborowic. Containing Romanesque inscriptions, some scholars hypothesize that the stone itself was originally a Celtic sculpture.
  - St Bartholomew's parish church was rebuilt in the second half of the 14th century, but its Romanesque features are still visible in the external walls, particularly the north wall. The features include dressed stones made of sandstone and a massive stone cross built into the wall.

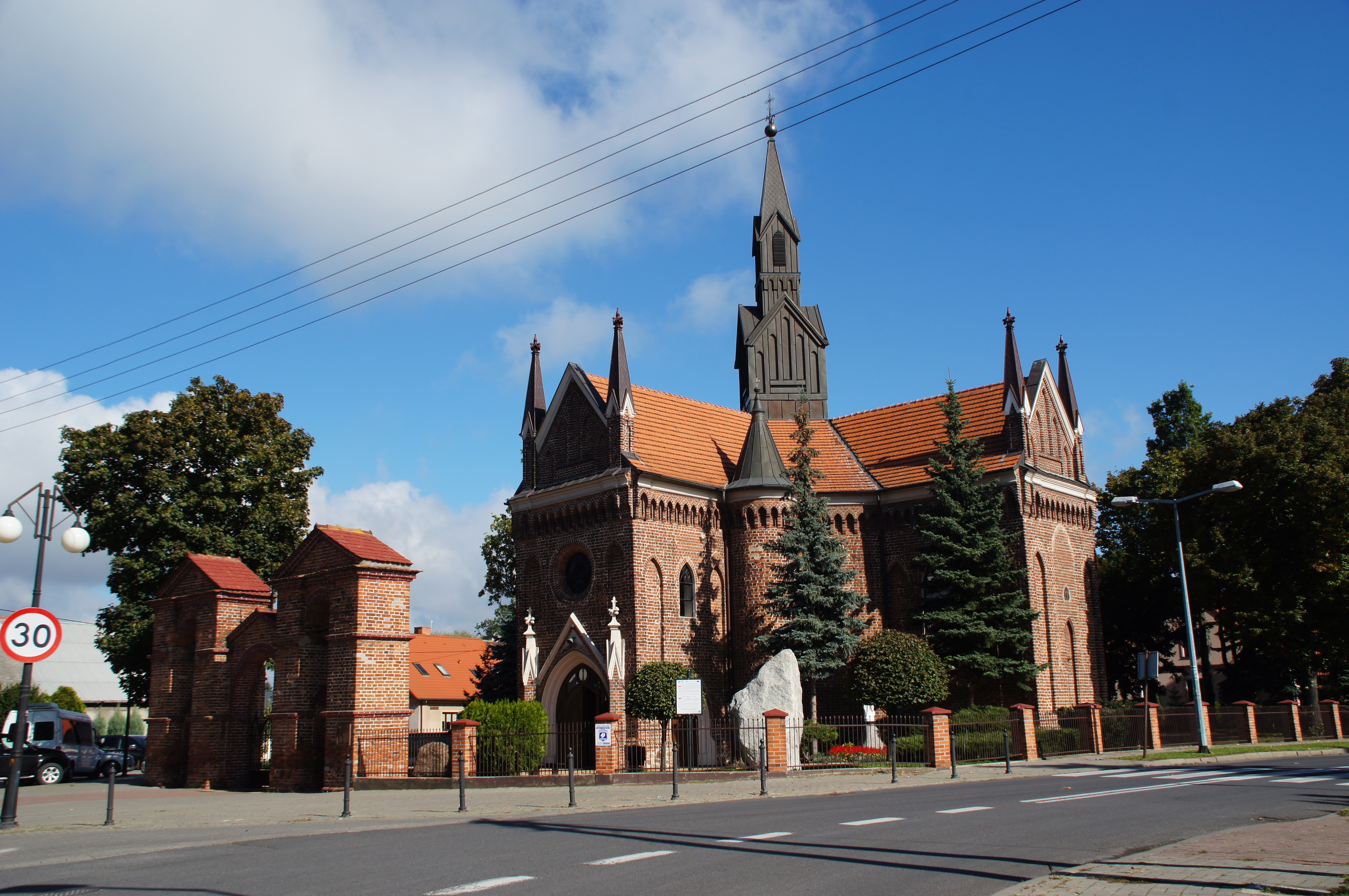
St. Andrew's Church

- Gothic
  - St Bartholomew's Parish Church is Konin's most notable example of Gothic architecture and art. It contains a gothic net and vault inside the church and stained glass in the chancel.
  - St Andrew's Church, in Konin's Gosławice district, is a rural Gothic church with an unusual Greek cross. The building also contains a rare fan vault. Sandstone bosses and other details are richly carved. The external walls are embellished with a number of coats of arms.
  - The 15th-century mediaeval castle in Gosławice, currently a regional museum, was built at the direction of Poznań's Bishop Andrzej Łaskarz in 1418–1426. It was designed to be defended with firearms. Gosławice contains a rare collection of historical buildings, with its ancient village, Gothic church, mediaeval castle, and old Polish manor.
- Renaissance
  - On the grounds of St. Bartholomew's Church is the Late Renaissance chapel of Jan Zemełko (Zemelius), a local physician, Renaissance man, and well-known member of the middle class in Konin and Kalisz.
  - The former home of Jan Zemełko, on the Plac Wolności, has been refurbished many times since Zemełko's era, but the main hall still contains the original barrel vault. At the ground floor level, the walls are exceedingly thick (1 to 2 m).
- Mannerism
  - The Manneristic tombstone of Stanisław Przyjemski is located at the north wall of the main nave of St. Bartholomew's Parish Church.
  - Manneristic wooden stalls, with inlaid work, are located in the Chapel of Jan Zemełko (Zemelius).

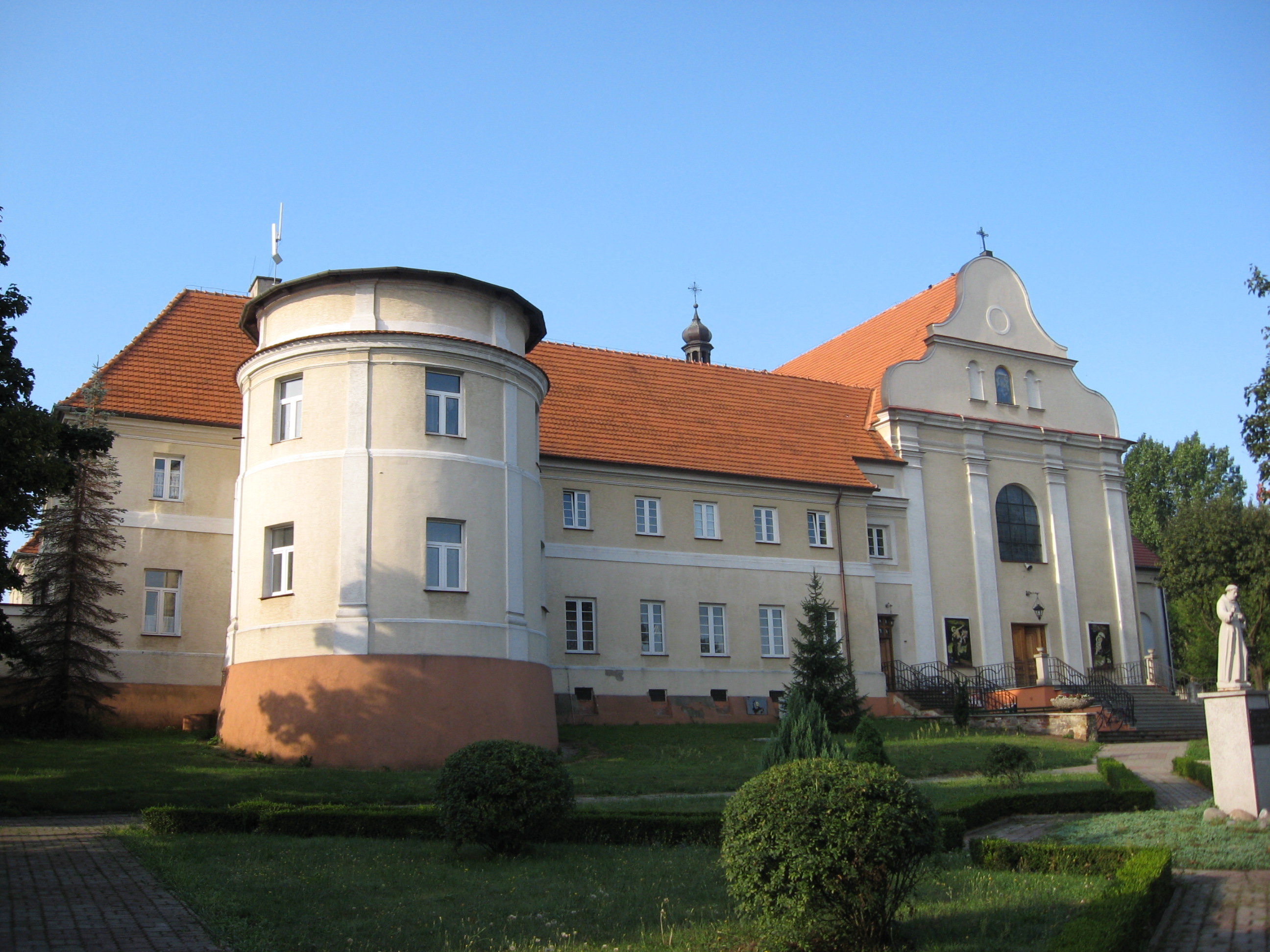
Monastery and St. Mary Magdalene's Church of Reformed Franciscans

- Baroque
  - St. Bartholomew's Parish Church contains many Baroque altars, epitaphs, and stalls, and a Late Baroque wall crucifix hangs in the porch. The Late Baroque church organ dates from the 18th century.
  - The Baroque monastery and church building at St. Mary Magdalene's Church of Reformed Franciscans were built in 1631.
- Rococo
  - At St. Bartholomew's Parish Church, Rococo elements are found in the wall crucifix above the entrance to the porch at the north wall of the main nave and in the main altar at the Chapel of Jan Zemełko.

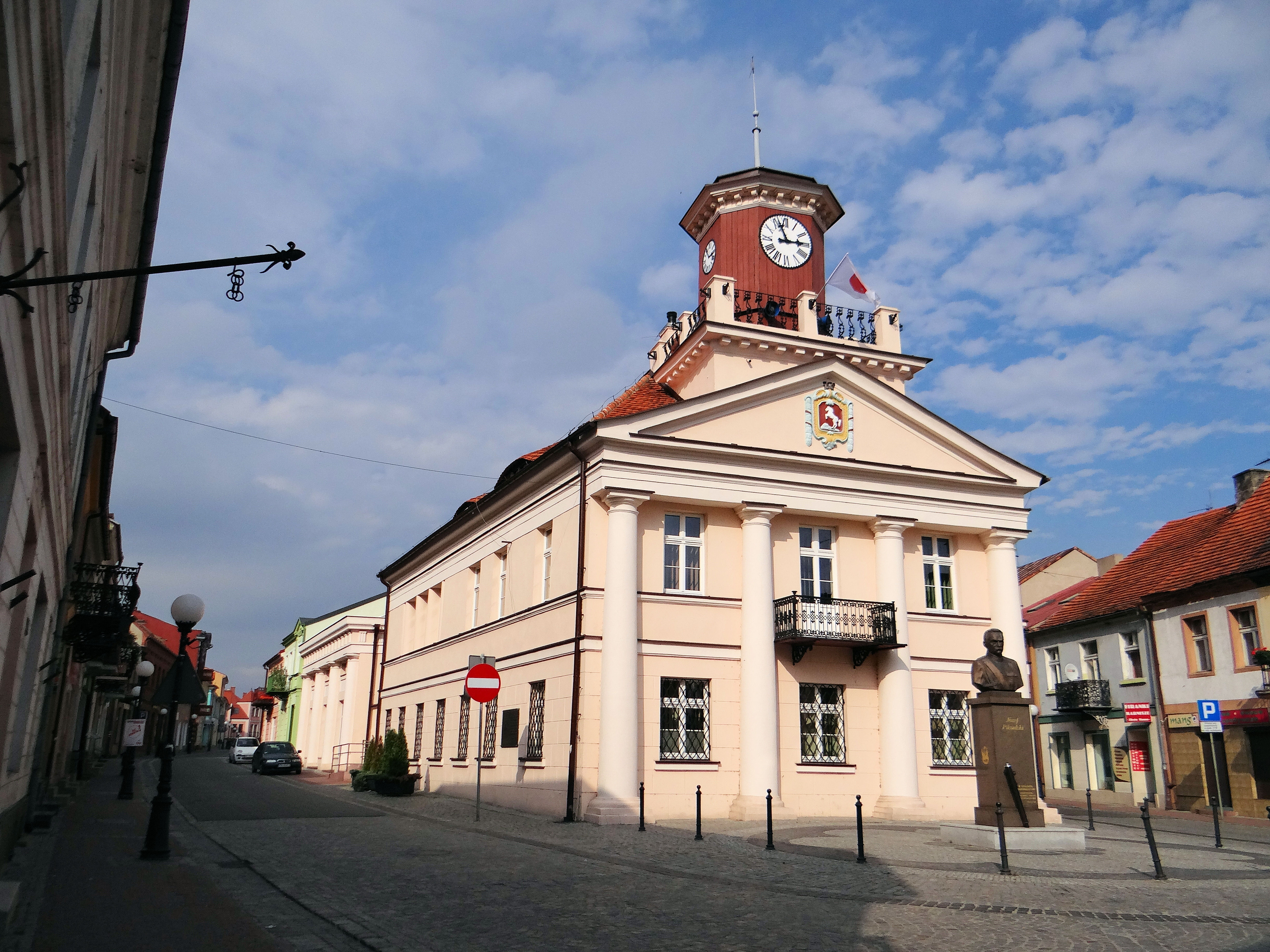
Old Town Hall

- Classicism
  - The Town Hall, built at the beginning of the 19th century, has a façade encompassing four, tall Toscany Columns bearing a large pediment. Above the pediment is a small tower with a clock and a tall flagstaff from which the official flag of Konin is hung on local and state holidays.
  - Old Town contains many Classicist tenement houses as well as a former butcher's shop in the same style, near the Town Hall.
  - The Municipal Council Building, near the Plac Wolności, is of the Classicist style.
  - The Presbytery of the Lutheran Church of the Holy Ghost is a Classicist manor house, situated in the small garden at the center of the Old Town.
- Neo-Gothic (19th and 20th centuries)
  - St Bartholomew's Parish Church has a Neo-Gothic main altar made of wood, with many Neo-Gothic statues decorating it.
  - St Andrew's Church, in the Gosławice District, originally was built in the Gothic style. It was refurbished in the Neo-Gothic manner. Its central turret and the façades of its chapels were built in the 19th century.
- Eclecticism (19th and 20th centuries)
  - The Lutheran Church of the Holy Ghost, constructed in 1856 and rebuilt in 1901-1915 and 1981–1985, is a representation of Eclecticism. Built when Konin was under the control of the Russian Empire, it is somewhat reminiscent of the style of Russian Orthodox churches. Constructed of dark brick, its massive main tower is covered with spires and many decorative details.
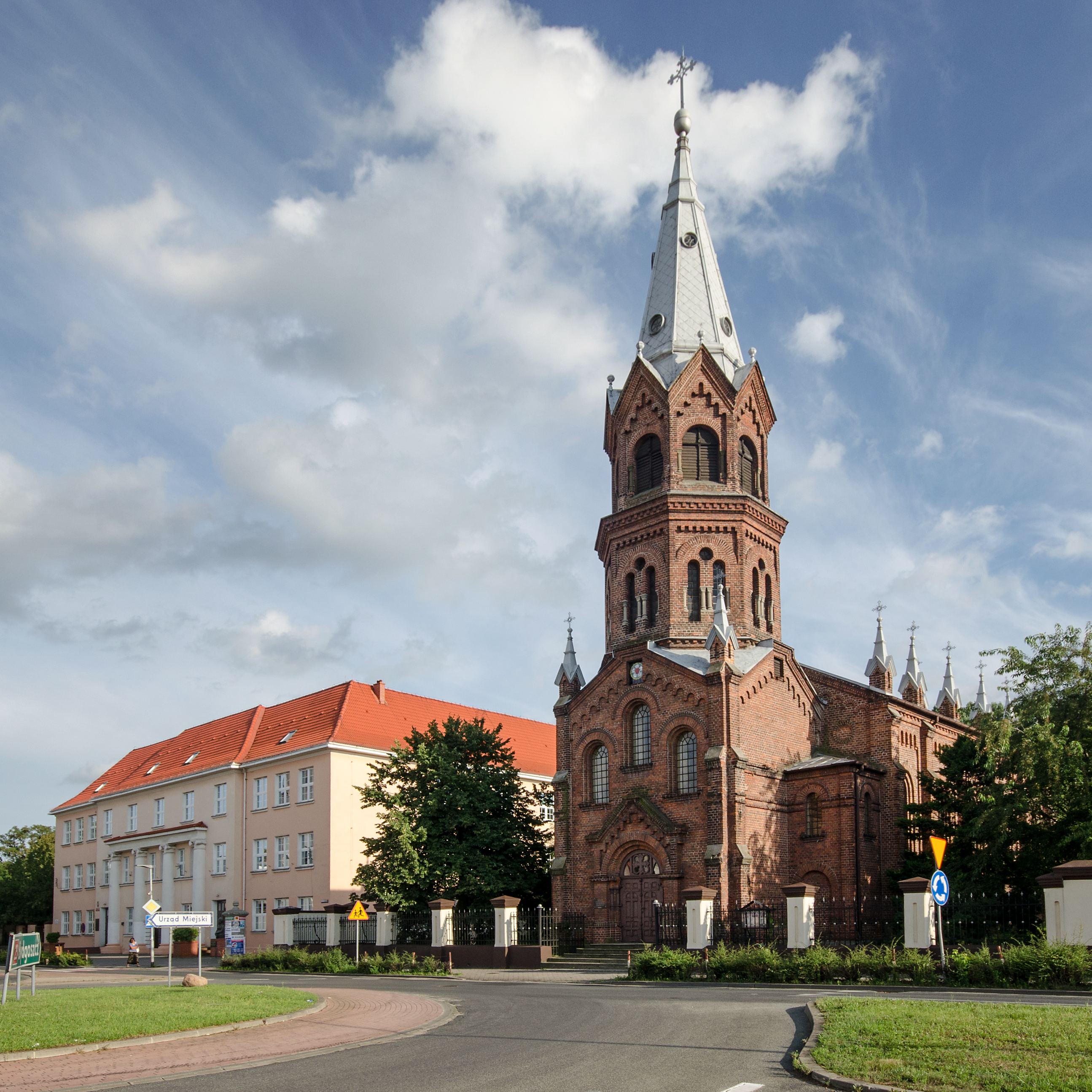
    Lutheran Church of the Holy Ghost
  - St. Adalbert's Church, in the Morzysław District, was built in the 18th century on the site of an earlier wooden church and its churchyard. It was completely refurbished, enlarged, and altered at the beginning of the 20th century, resulting in an impressive large temple, with a tall main tower topped by a high spire. This church, also, shows the slight influence of Russian Orthodox architecture.
  - Many tenement houses in Old Town have eclectic façades displaying the features of many different architectural manners and styles.
  - Other examples of Eclecticism in Konin are found in the Jewish buildings, including the Konin Synagogue, the ritual baths, and the Talmudic schoolhouse. These buildings were constructed in the 19th century, and the synagogue is considered to be one of the most beautiful buildings of its kind in Greater Poland. Erected in 1832, it was enlarged and renovated in 1883. Its southern façade refers to the history of the Ashkenazi Jews and comprises a mix of architectural styles, with a predominance of the Moorish and Neo-Gothic styles. The north façade is more composed and unencumbered, referring mainly to Classicism, as in its huge pediment.
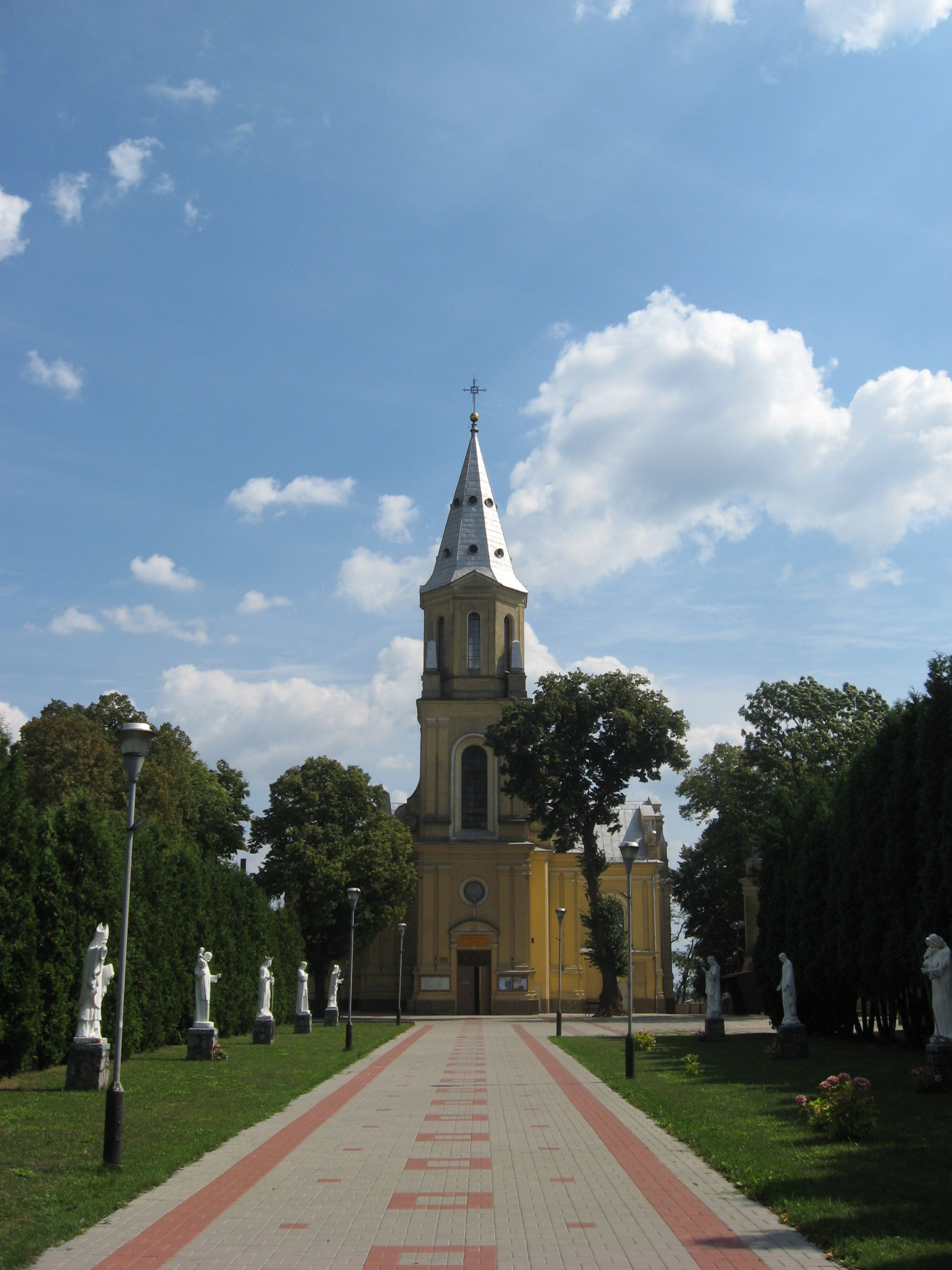
    St. Adalbert's Church
  - The Romani Gypsy palaces of ulica Stodolniana and ulica Europejska, in the Old Town, exhibit impressive onion domes and sculptures shaped like miniature, richly embellished mediaeval castles. Built mainly in the 1980s and 1990s, they represent a unique element within the city's residential districts.
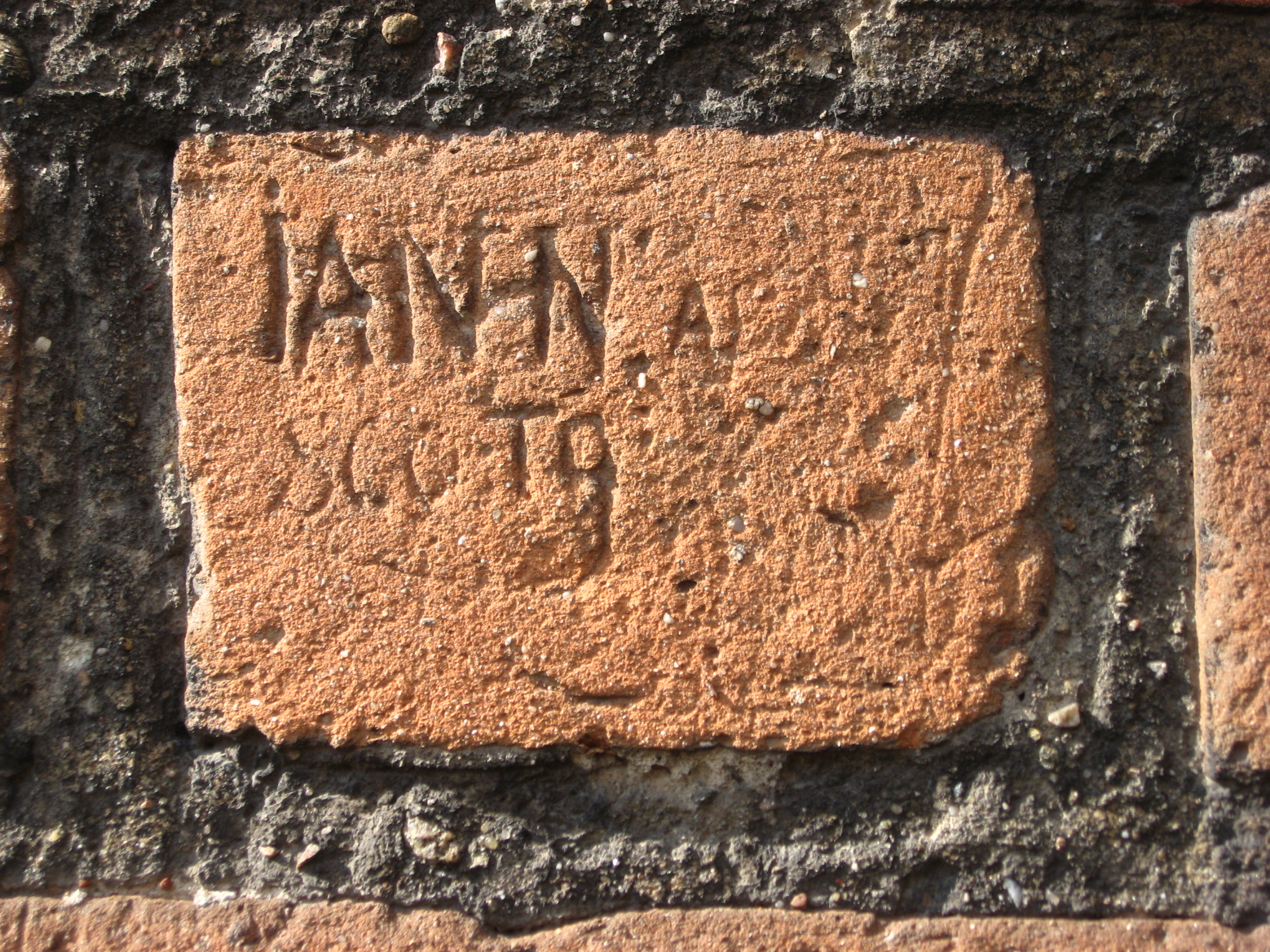
    17th century inscription on the wall of St. Bartholomew's Parish Church, carved by a Scotsman
- Modernism: Pre-War (1920–1939)
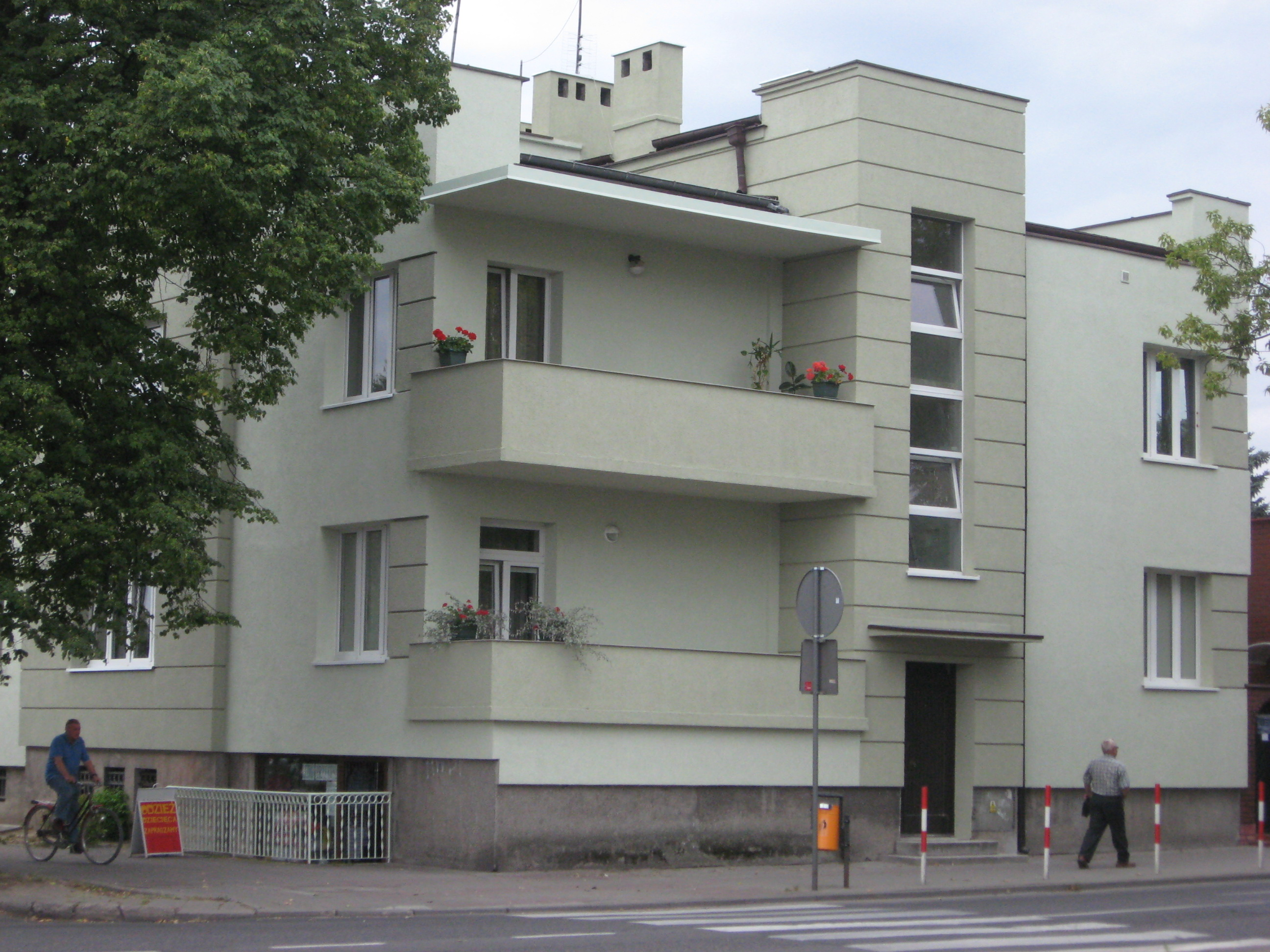
  Szarych Szeregów 1 Street
  - Ulica Szarych Szeregów 1 is an impressive renovated tenement house with a distinguished façade and an infamous history. Built in the 1930s by a local MP, it housed the World War II offices of the Nazi Gestapo, who tortured prisoners there. After 1945, the building was occupied by the Communist secret state police, the Urząd Bezpieczeństwa. The building now houses private apartments.
  - Ulica 3 Maja 48 is a fine example of pre-war Modernism. The Guild of Handicrafts (Cech Rzemiosł Różnych) is situated there, as are various shops.
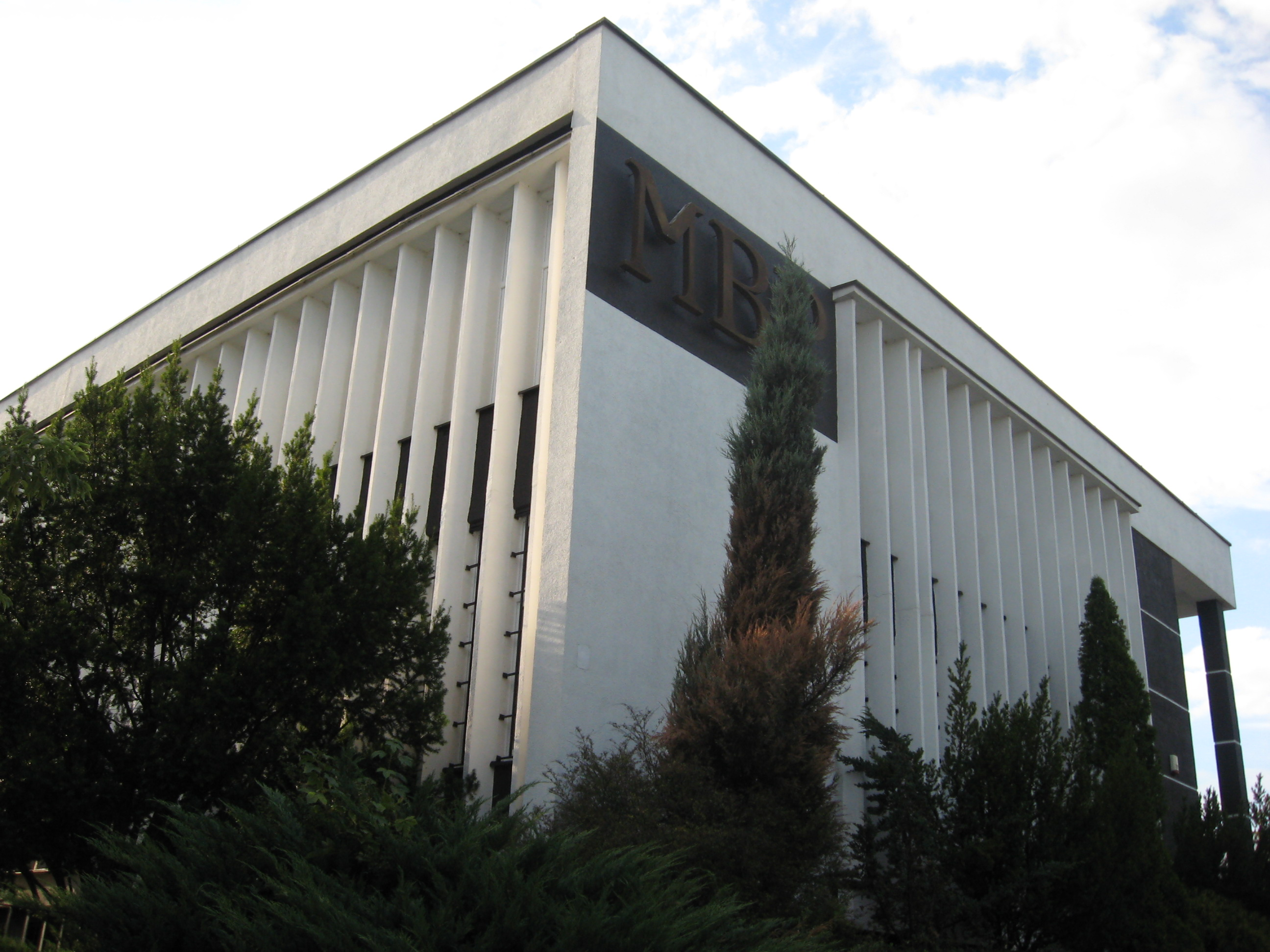
    Town Library (MBP)
- Modernism: Post-War (1945-1960s)
  - The town's library (Miejska Biblioteka Publiczna / MBP), at ulica Dworcowa, is a bulky, cube-shaped Modernistic structure. Perpendicular ribs of concrete divide its windows into narrow segments, and its stark, black on white façade rises strikingly from the thick greenery that surrounds it. Before becoming a library, it served as a branch of the National Bank of Poland (Narodowy Bank Polski / NBP).
  - Formerly the Centrum Department Store, the Dino Supermarket on ulica Dworcowa exhibits an upper, street-side façade that is covered entirely by the tilted glass.
- Nazi Architecture
  - Several examples of Nazi architecture exist in Konin, including a row of buildings in ulica Kolejowa, in New Konin, that were built as lodgings for railwaymen. Just across the street is a monument, commemorating an August, 1943, Jewish uprising. Another set of Nazi buildings stand in the Old Town, near ulica Szpitalna. This area is known locally as Heimat, emphasizing its German connection.
- Socialist Realism
  - Aleje 1-go Maja (Avenue of the First of May), the main street of Nowy Konin, is lined with the city's earliest examples of Socialist Realism architecture. Among these are the hospital and various public buildings. Because New Konin was developed primarily after the 1946 installation of the Communist government, it contains very little other than buildings constructed in the stark, Socialist Realism style.
  - Osiedle V (Housing Estate No. 5), designed and built during the 1970s and the early 1980s, it consists characteristically of blocks of flats set in regular rows and devoid of any architectural decoration, a sombre testament to the economic difficulties of the People's Republic of Poland at the time of construction.
  - The Zatorze District, built during the 1980s, consists largely of massive blocks of flats built of prefabricated, grey concrete structural elements, attended by shops and schools of the same style.
- Postmodernism
  - Representing Catholic ecclesiastical Postmodernism, ten kilometres (6.2 miles) from Konin stands the monumental Basilica of Our Lady of Licheń, the world's sixth largest Christian church.
  - The PKO BP S.A. bank and office building at ulica 11-go Listopada (Eleventh of November) 20 was one of the first large buildings erected in Konin after the 1989 fall of Communism in Poland. While having many features rooted in Socialist Realism, it incorporates Postmodernist elements not previously seen in Konin.
  - The Skarpa office and commercial building at ulica Energetyka 6b was completed during the first decade of the 21st century. The utilitarian character of the building and its interior is in accord with the subtly adorned outer façades, which are covered with wide strips and plates in the colour of inox. The exterior pavement is covered with granite cuboids, and its inner floors are inlaid with dark granite plates.

=== PTTK (Polish Tourist and Sightseeing Society) ===
Perhaps owing to Konin being located at the junction of some of Poland's most historic lands - Greater Poland, Cuiavia, Mazovia, and Łódzkie - the local branch of the Polish Tourist and Sightseeing Society is very active. Moreover, the interest of non-Poles is piqued by the traces of, and monuments to, the many national minorities who have lived over the centuries in Konin and Konin County: Jews, Scots, Germans, Frenchmen, Russians, Romanis, Czechs, Swiss, Dutch Olędrzy, Vietnamese, Chinese, Romanians, and Africans.

Notably, Konin was one of the towns along the Scottish Trail - the route through urban areas of Greater Poland and Lower Silesia that connected the various Scottish trading communities that settled in Poland from the 15th century onward.

== Gallery ==
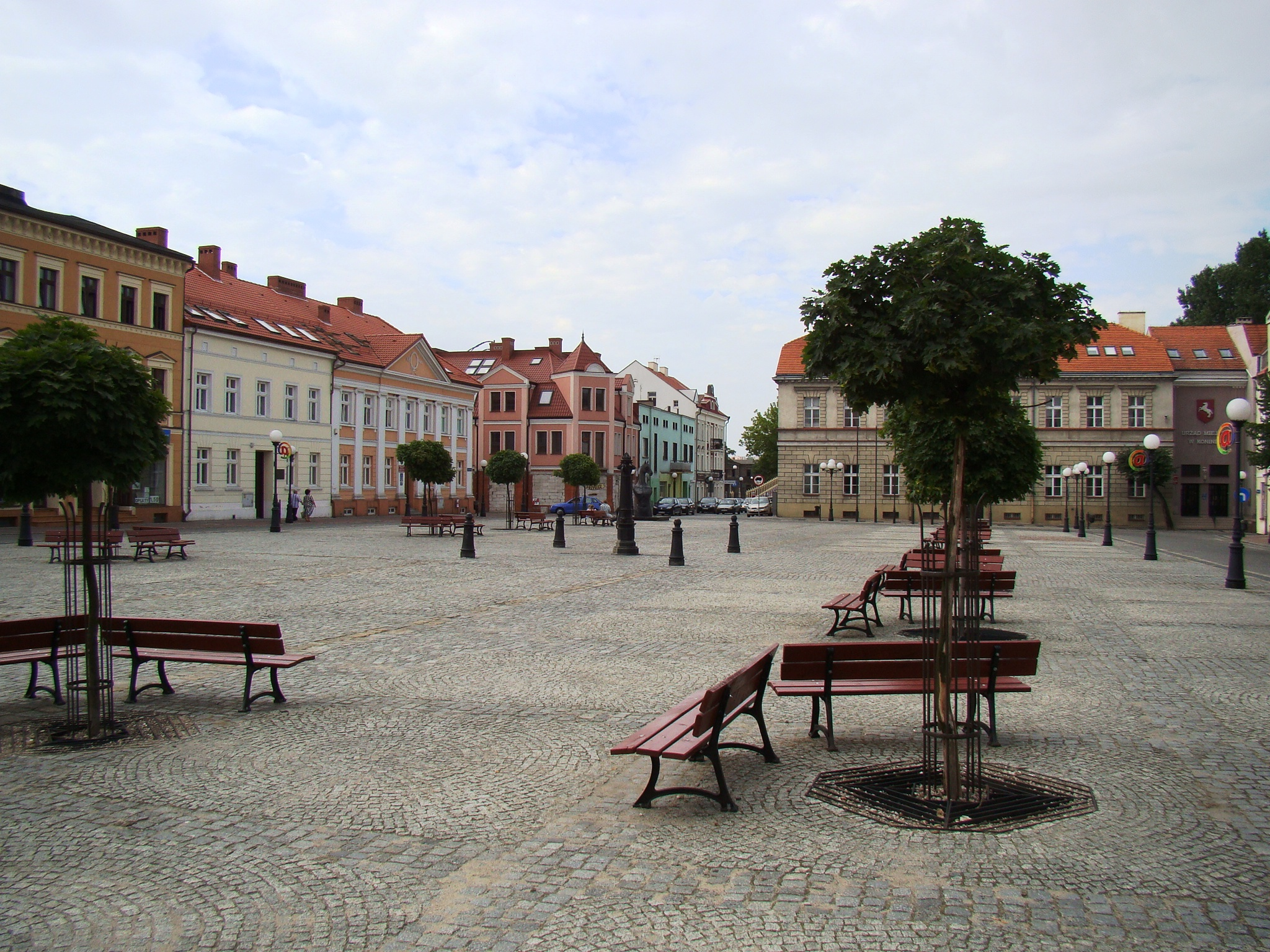
Liberty Square (Plac Wolności)

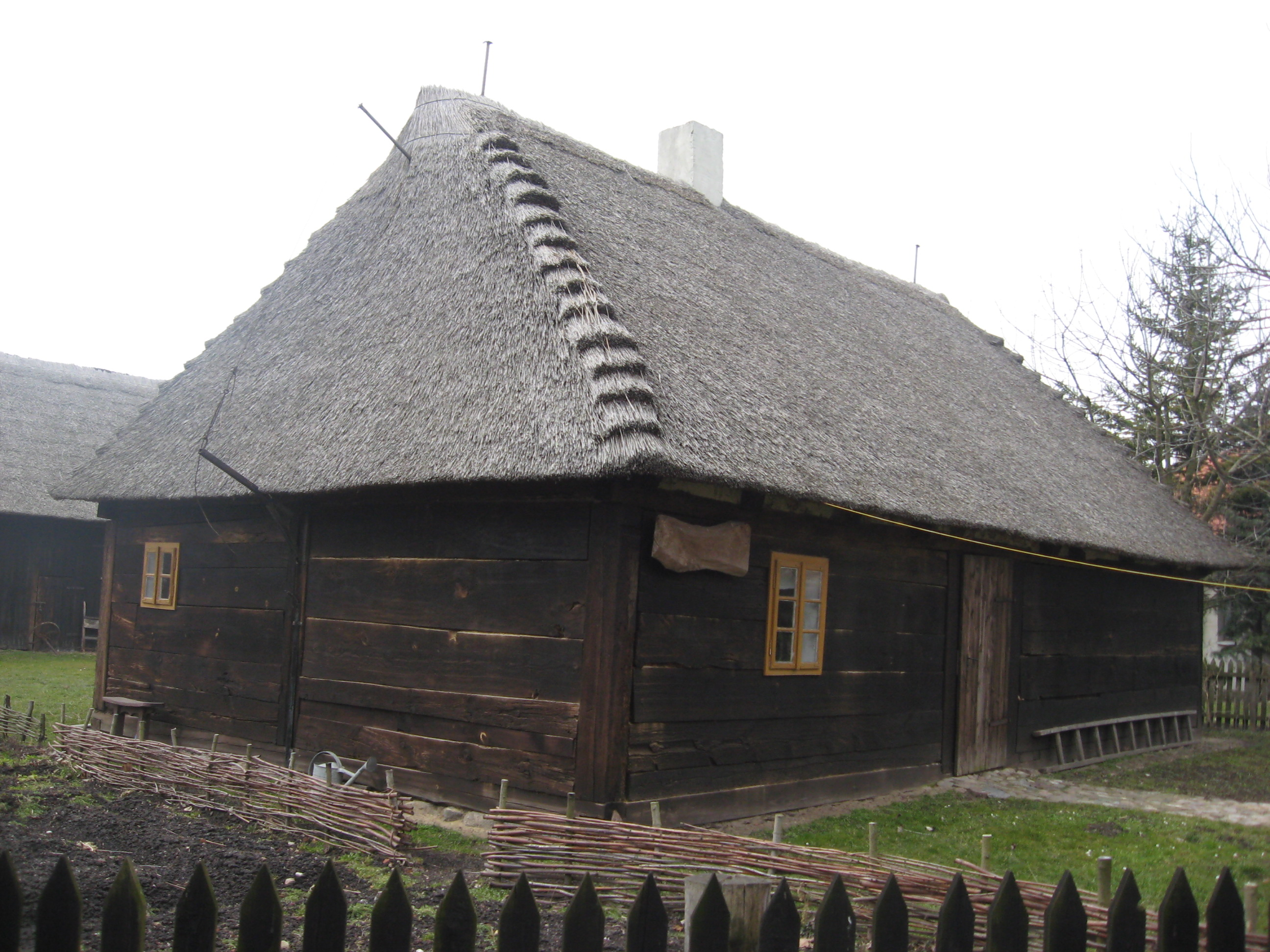
Old cottage in Gosławice

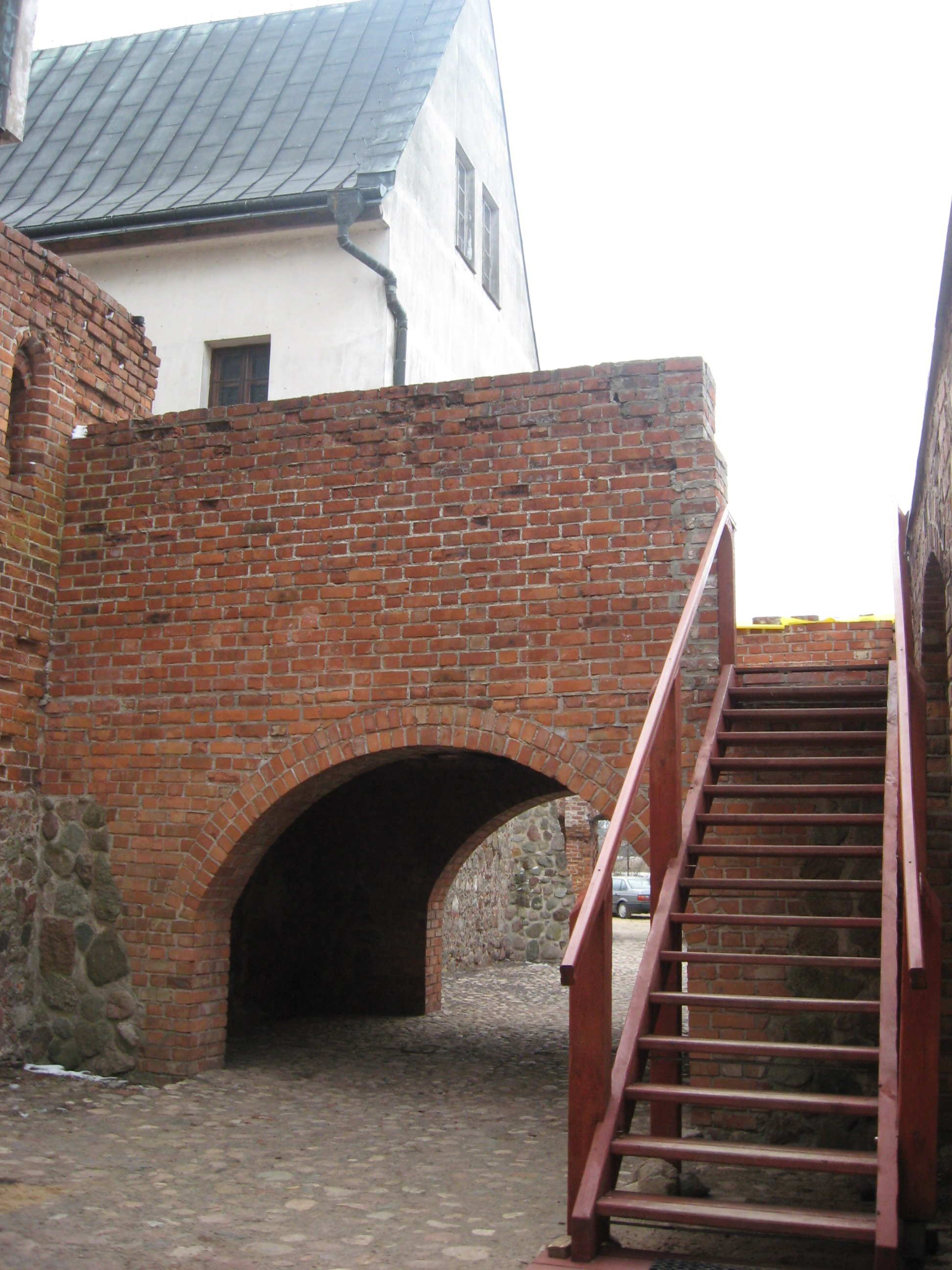
A nook in the castle at Gosławice

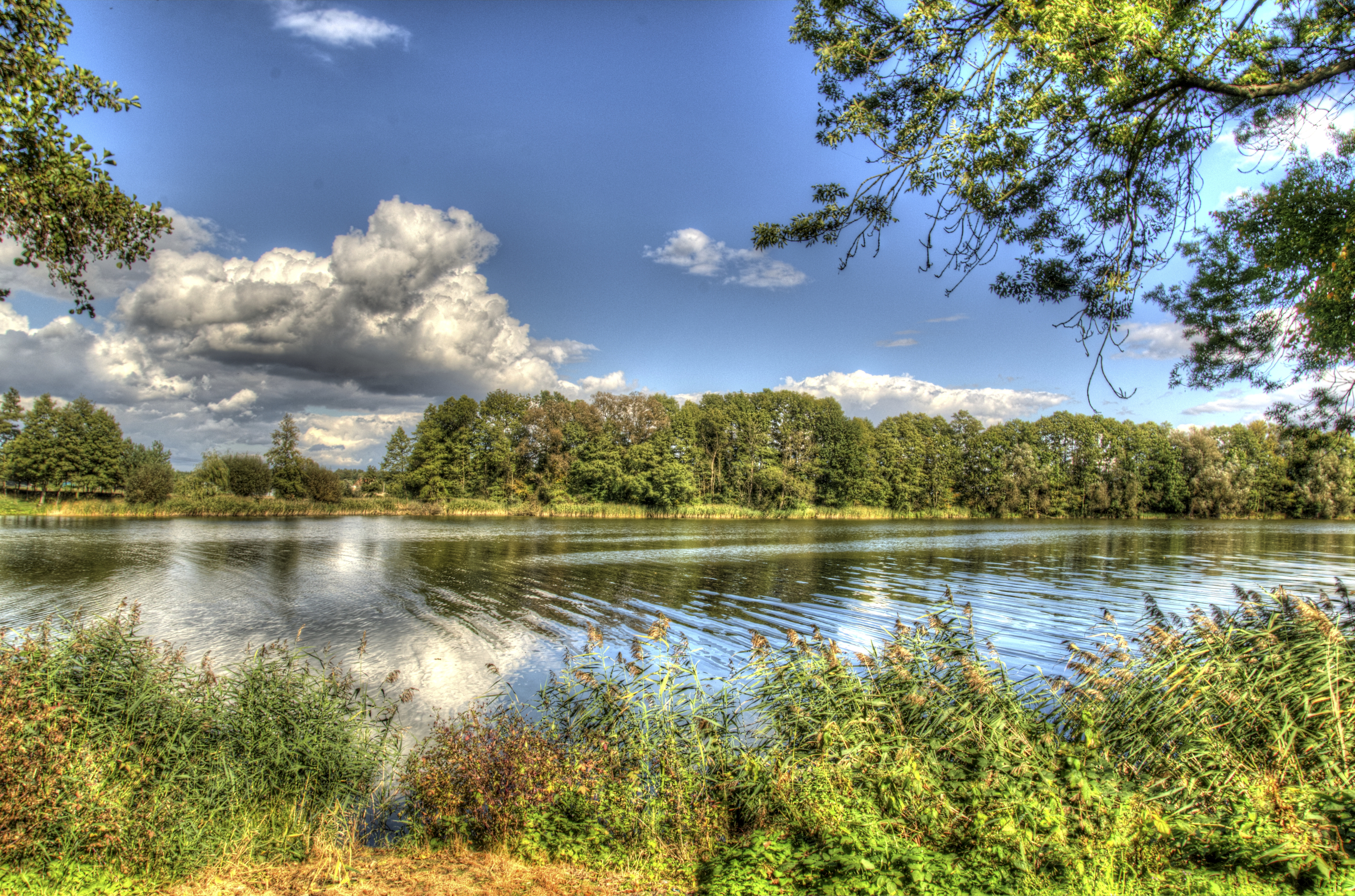
The Warta River

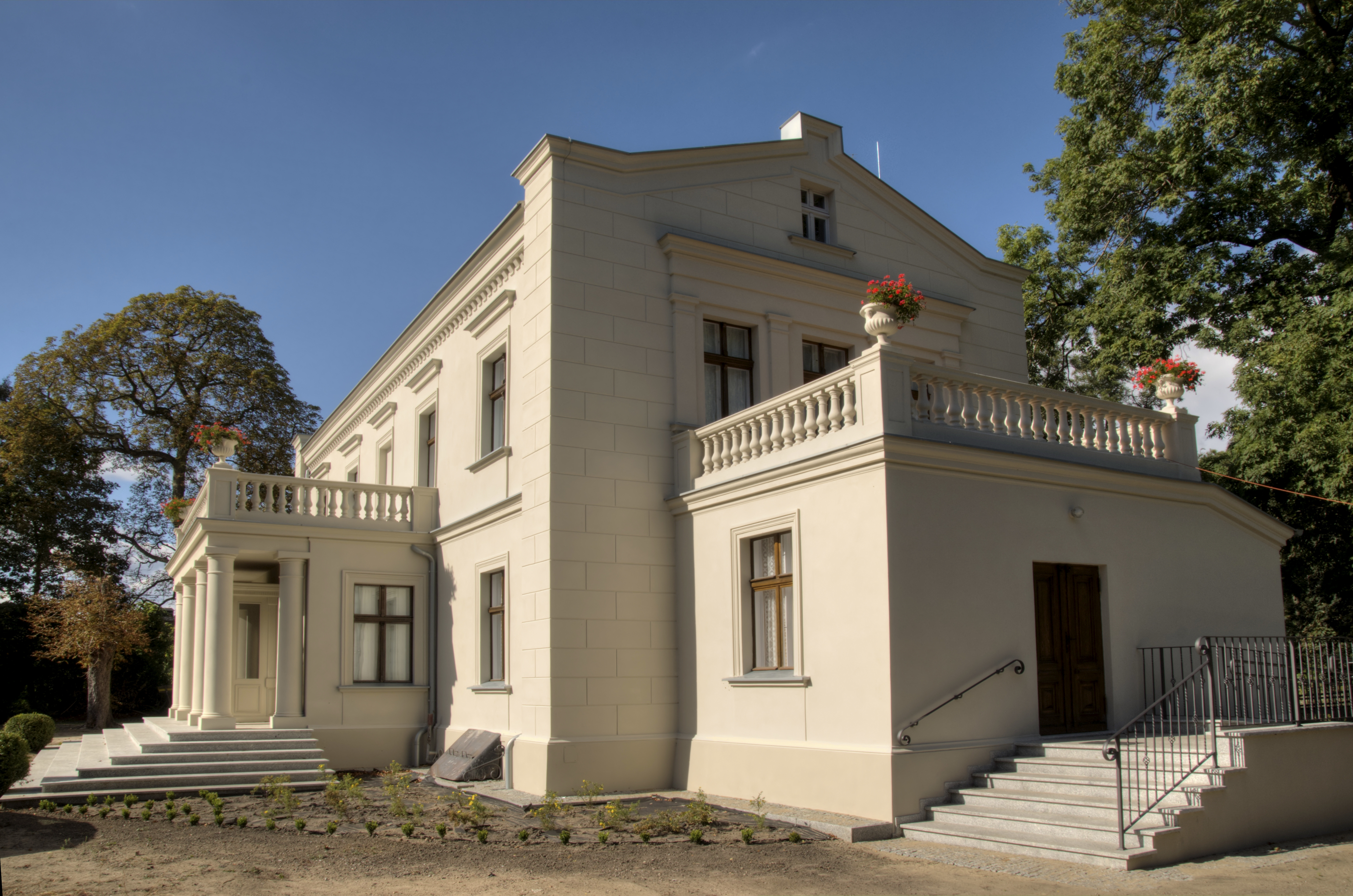
Country manor in Lwówek Park

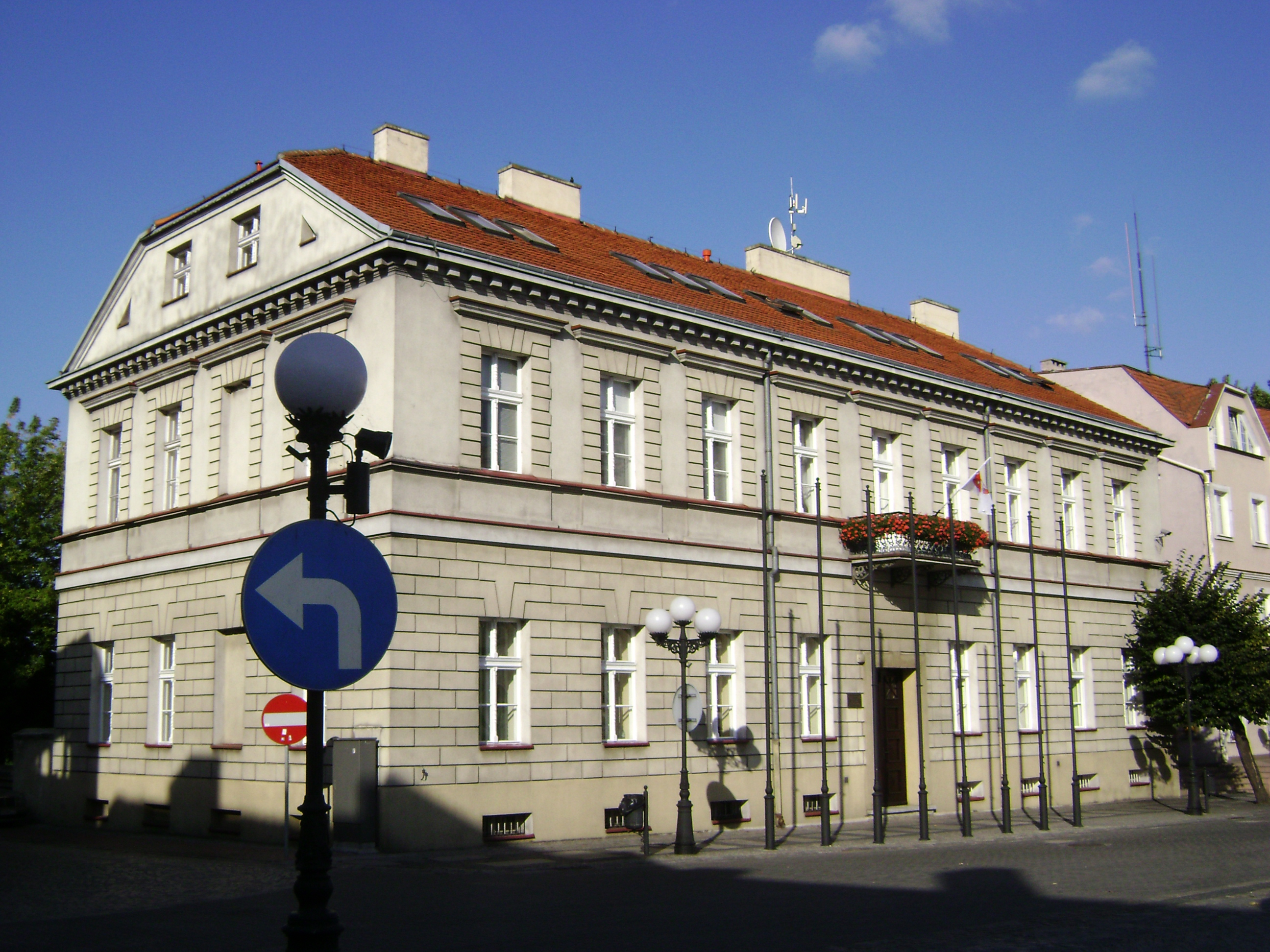
City Hall

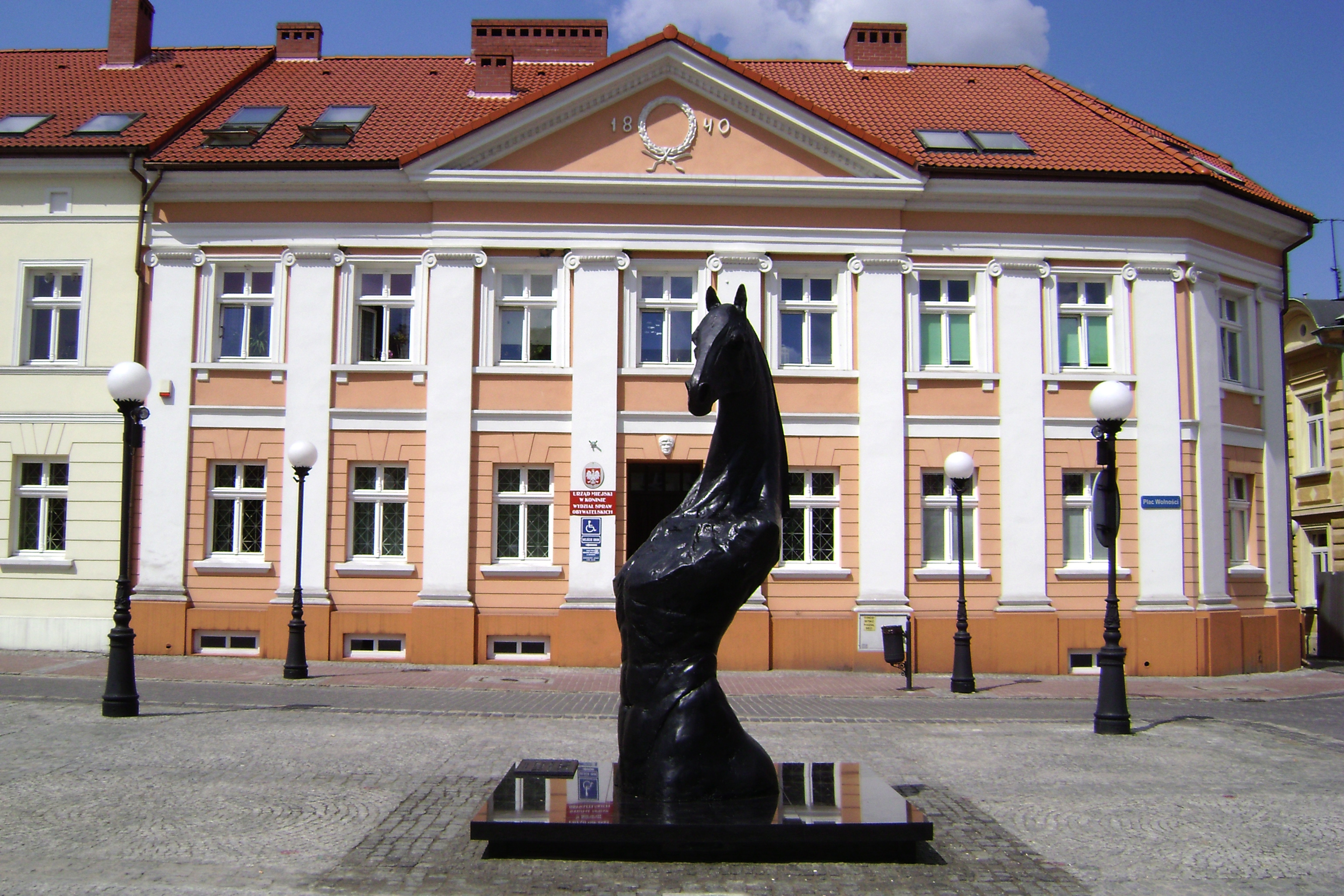
Former hotel, currently one of the city offices

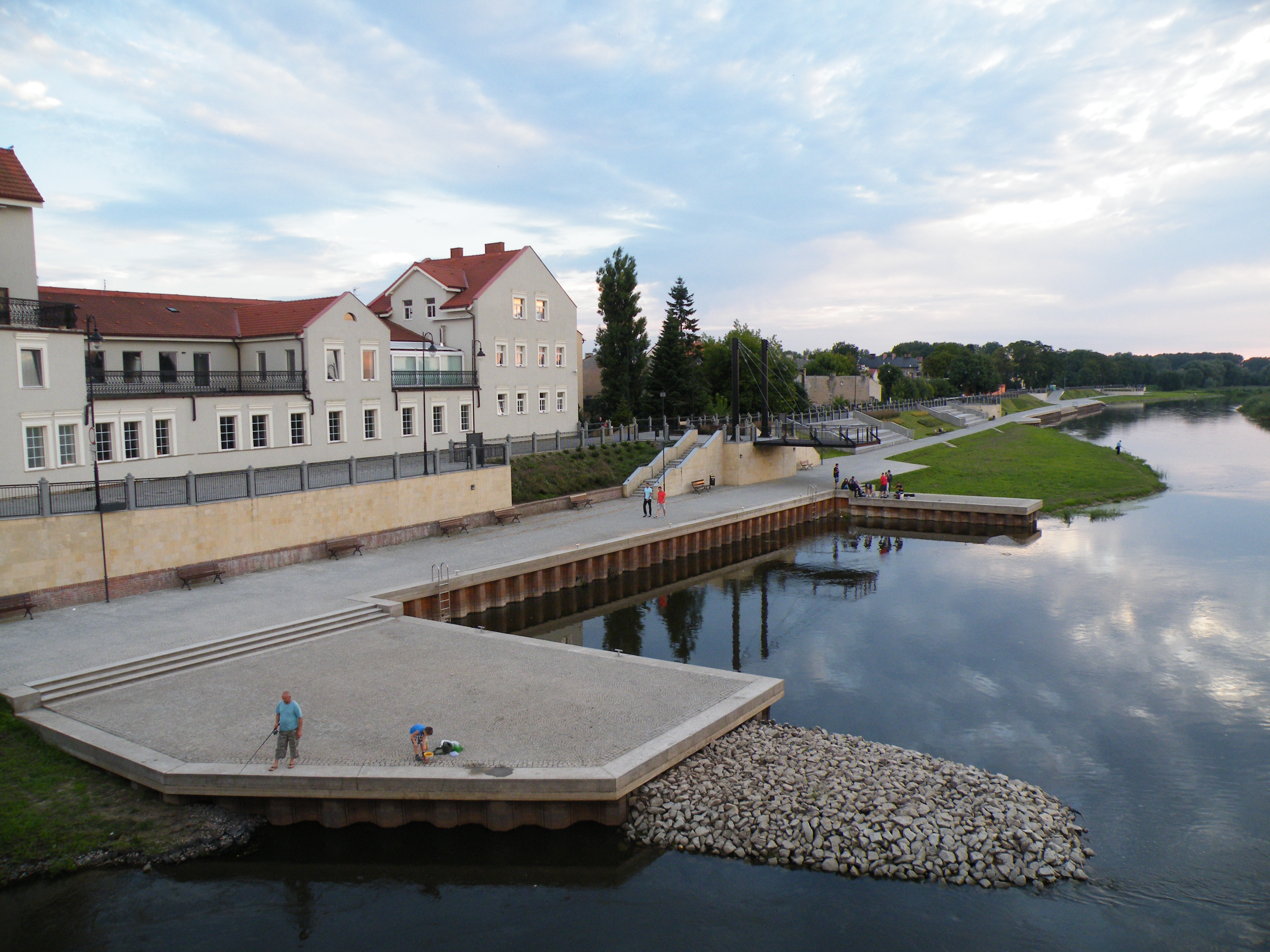
Boulevard by the Warta River

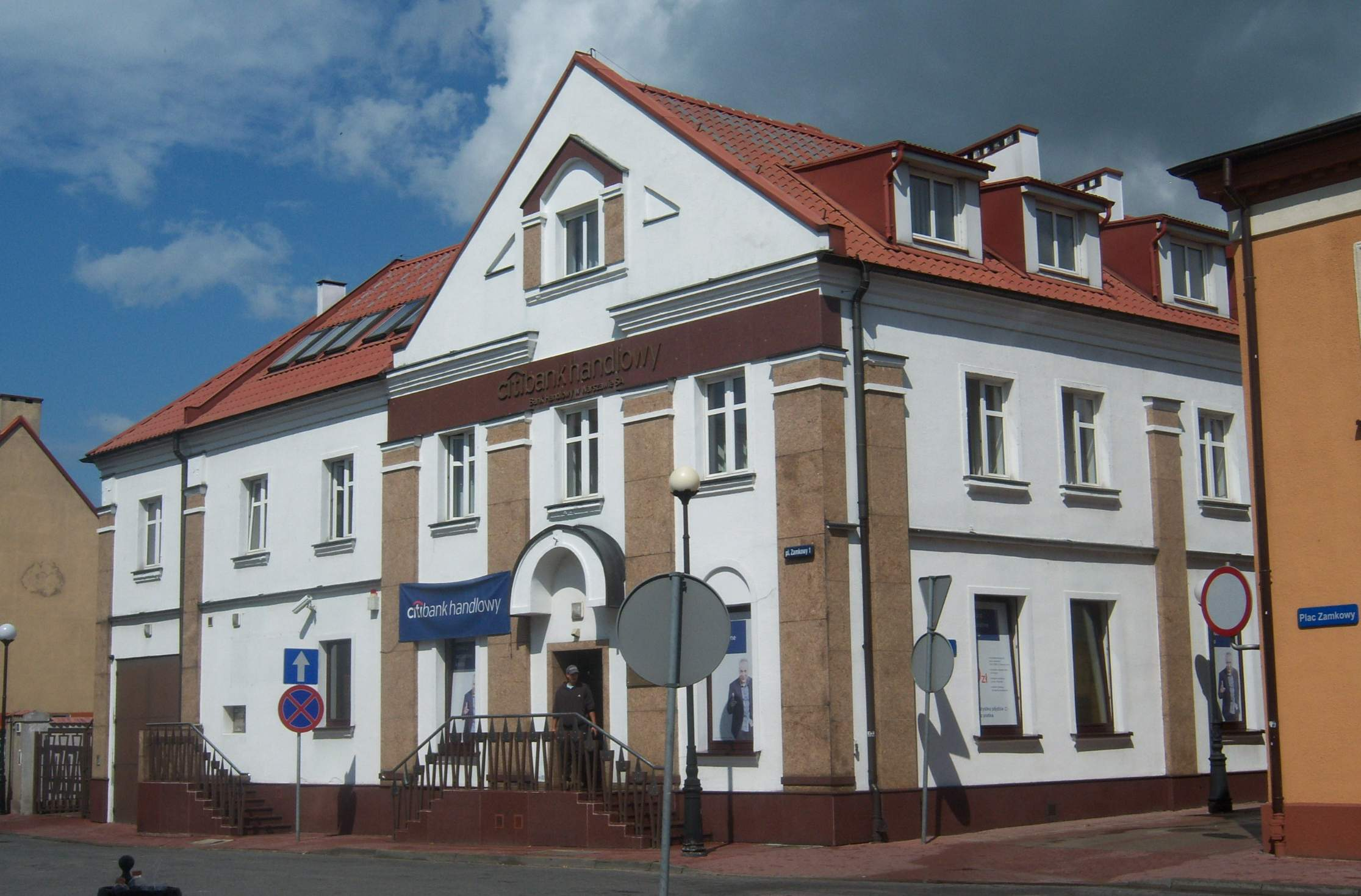
1 Zamkowy Square

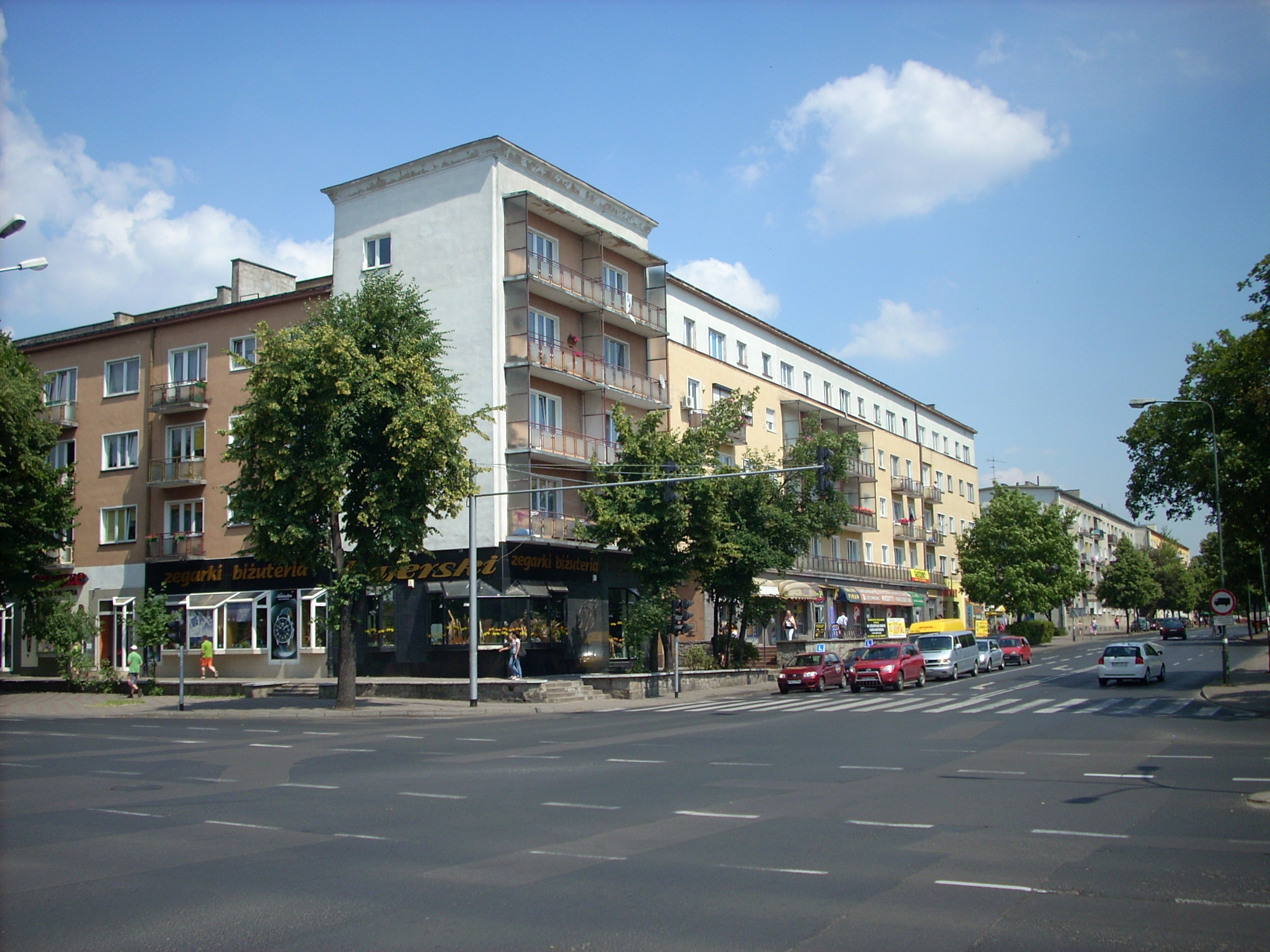
Corner of 3 Maja and Dworcowa Streets

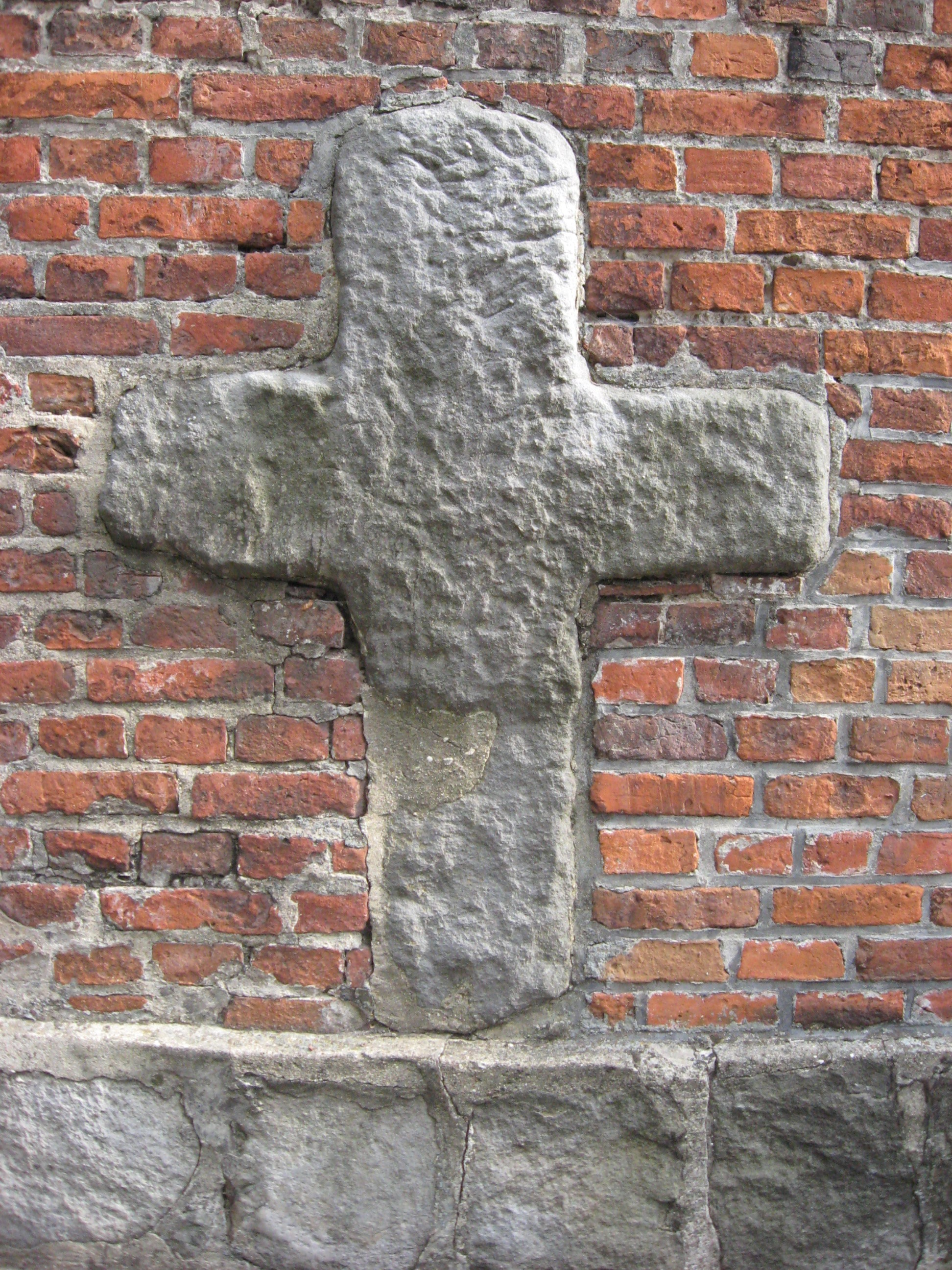
Romanesque cross on the north wall of St. Bartholomew's Church

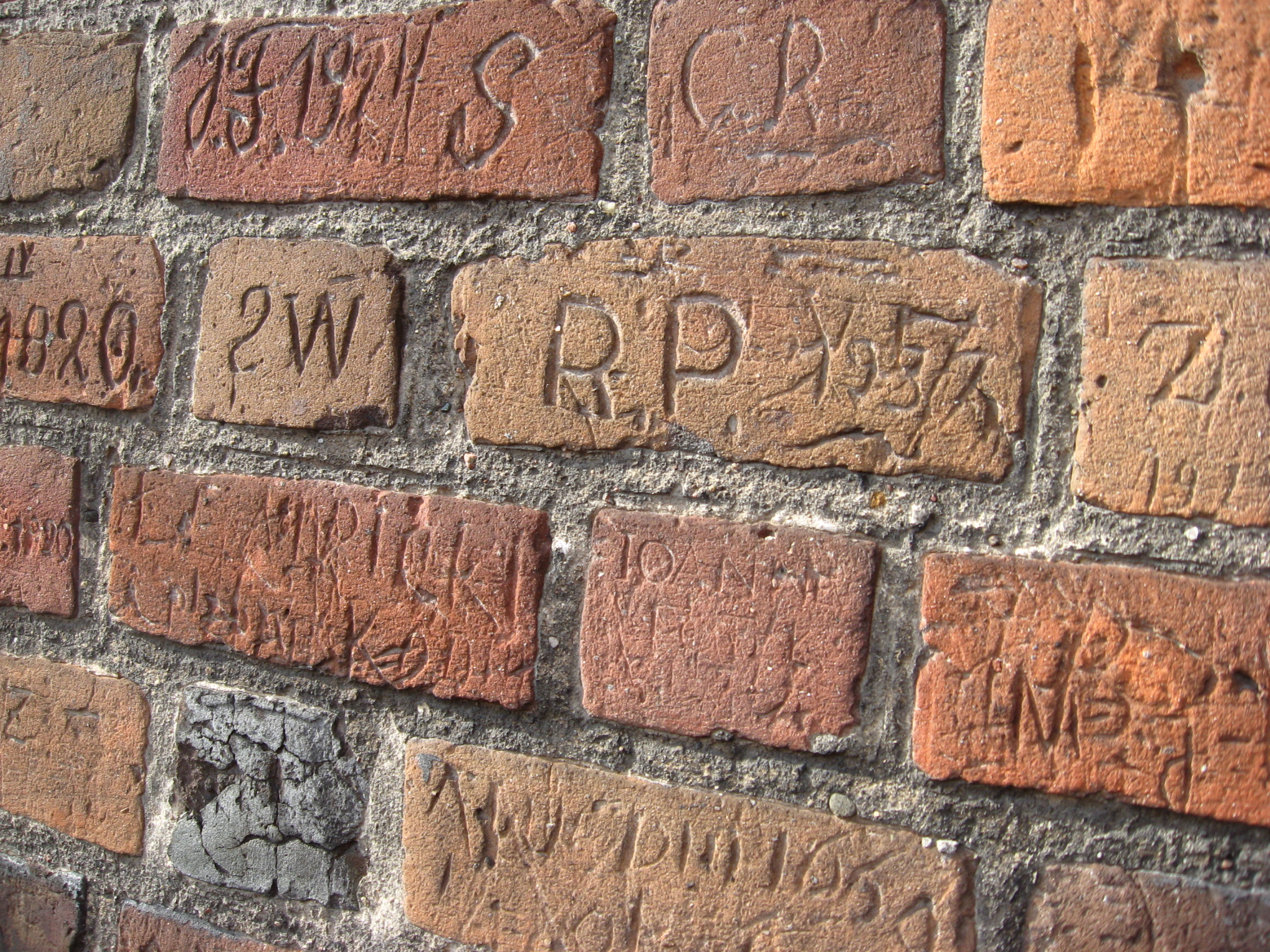
Inscriptions carved by local figures through the ages, on the wall of St. Bartholomew's Church

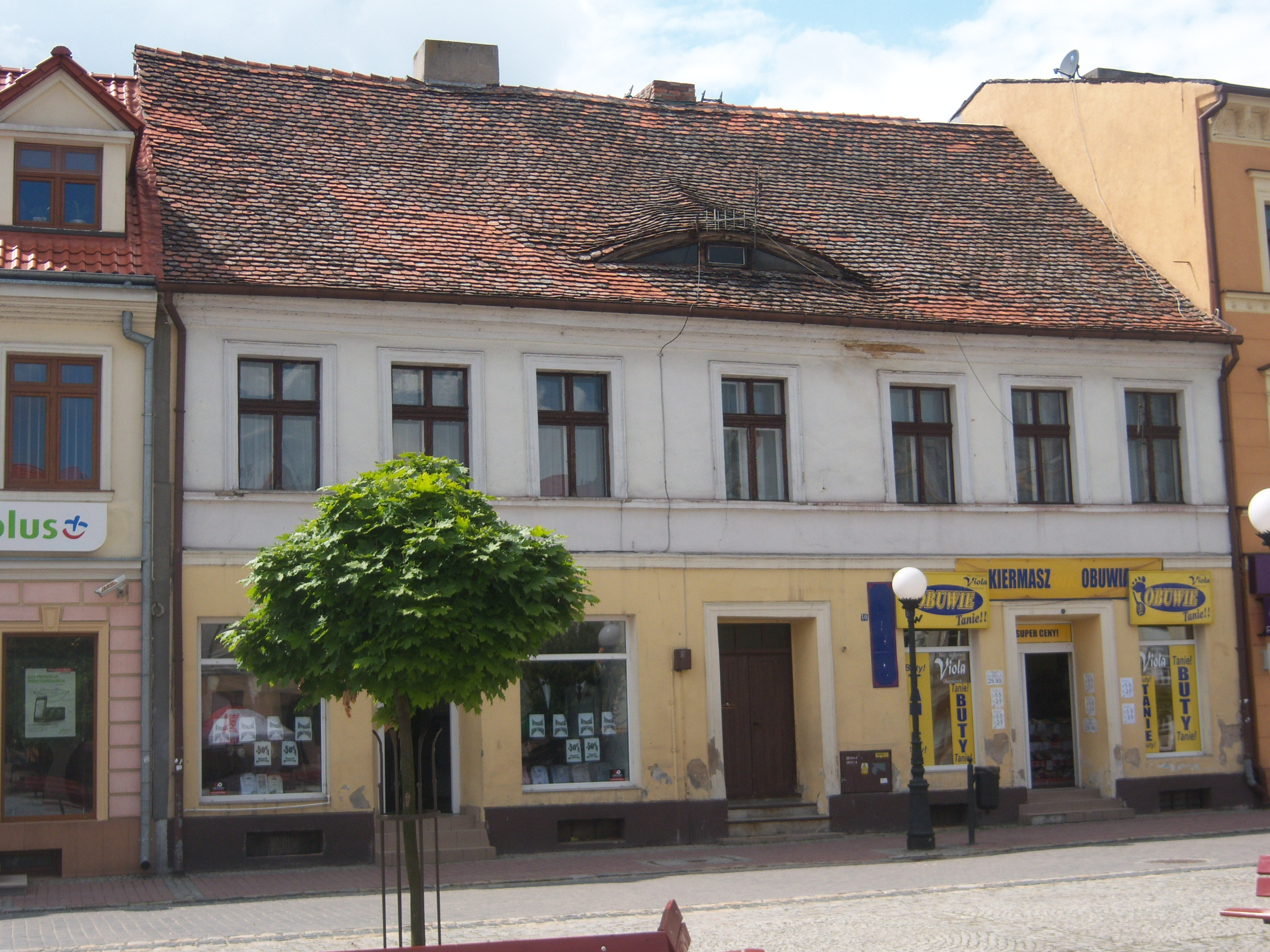
No. 10 Wolności Square

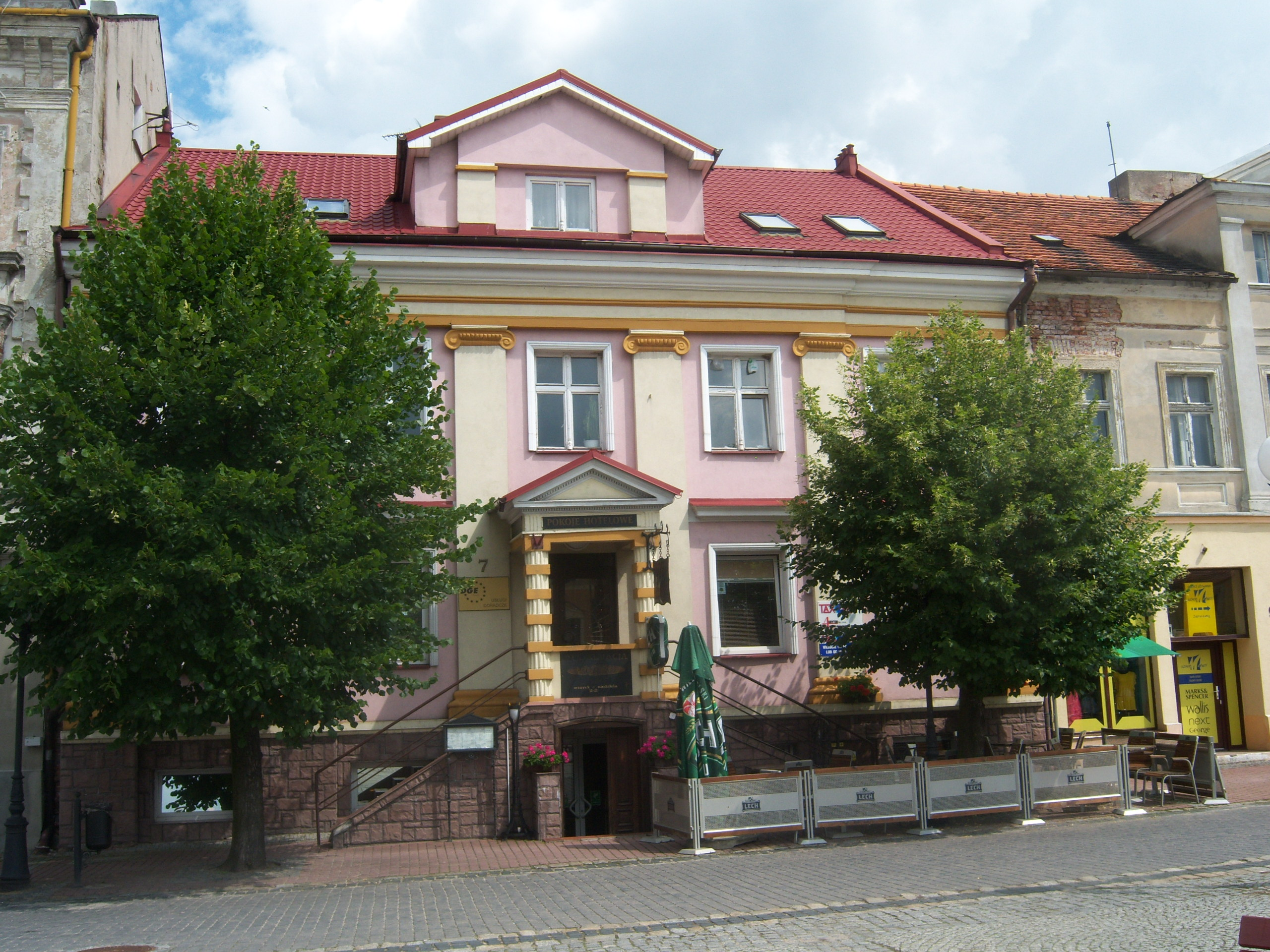
No. 7 Wolności Square

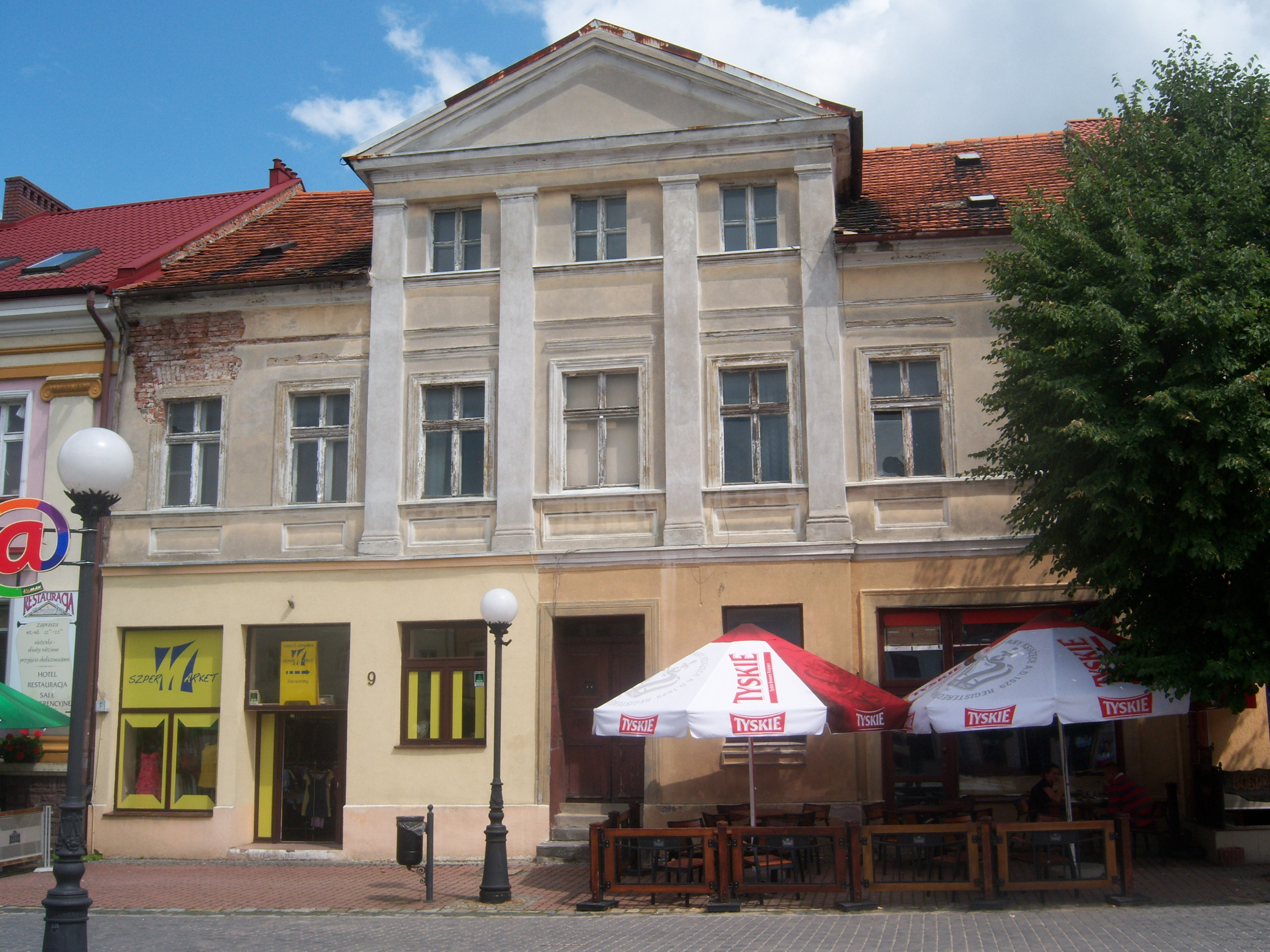
No. 9 Wolności Square

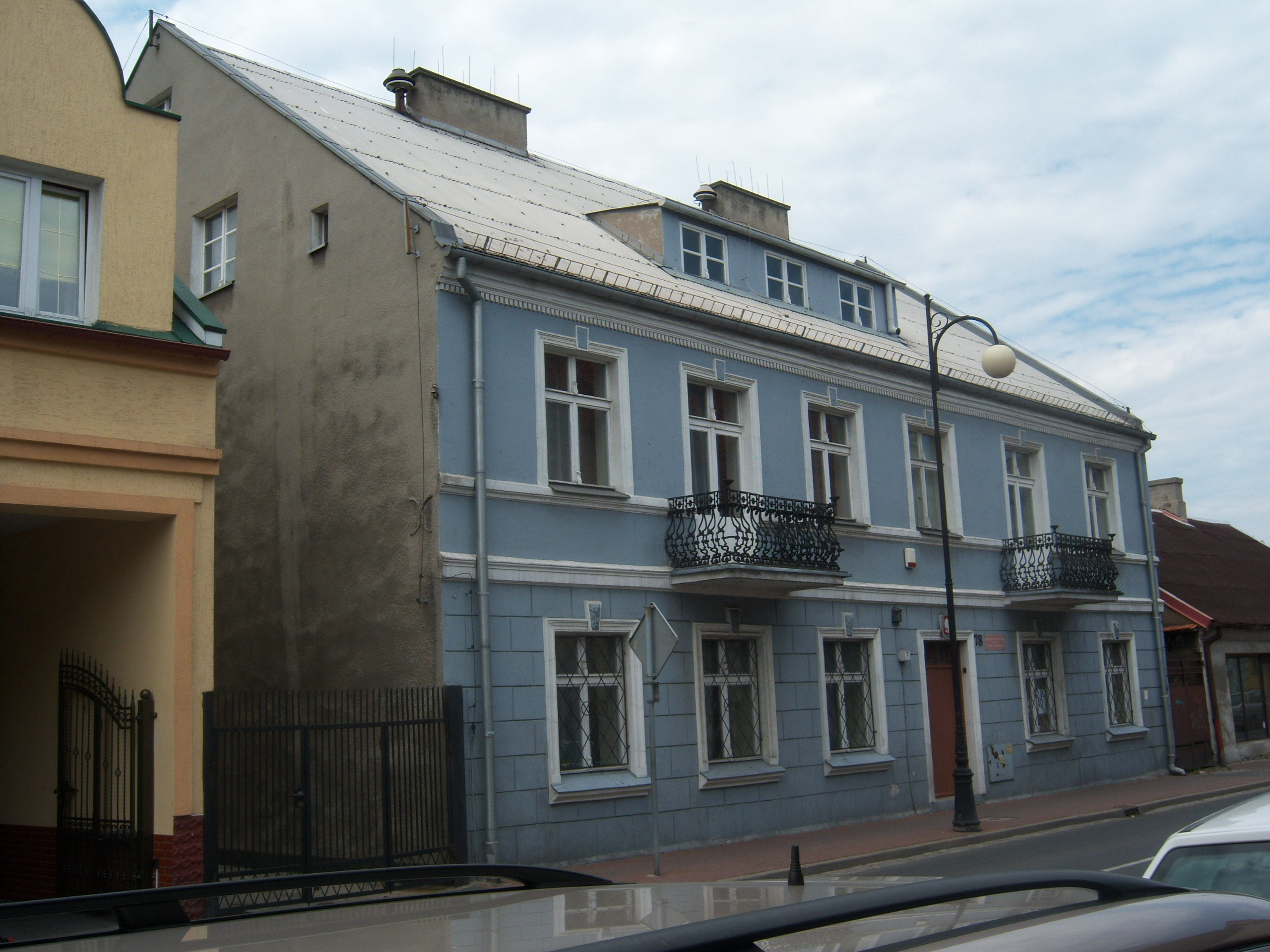
No. 78 3 Maja Street

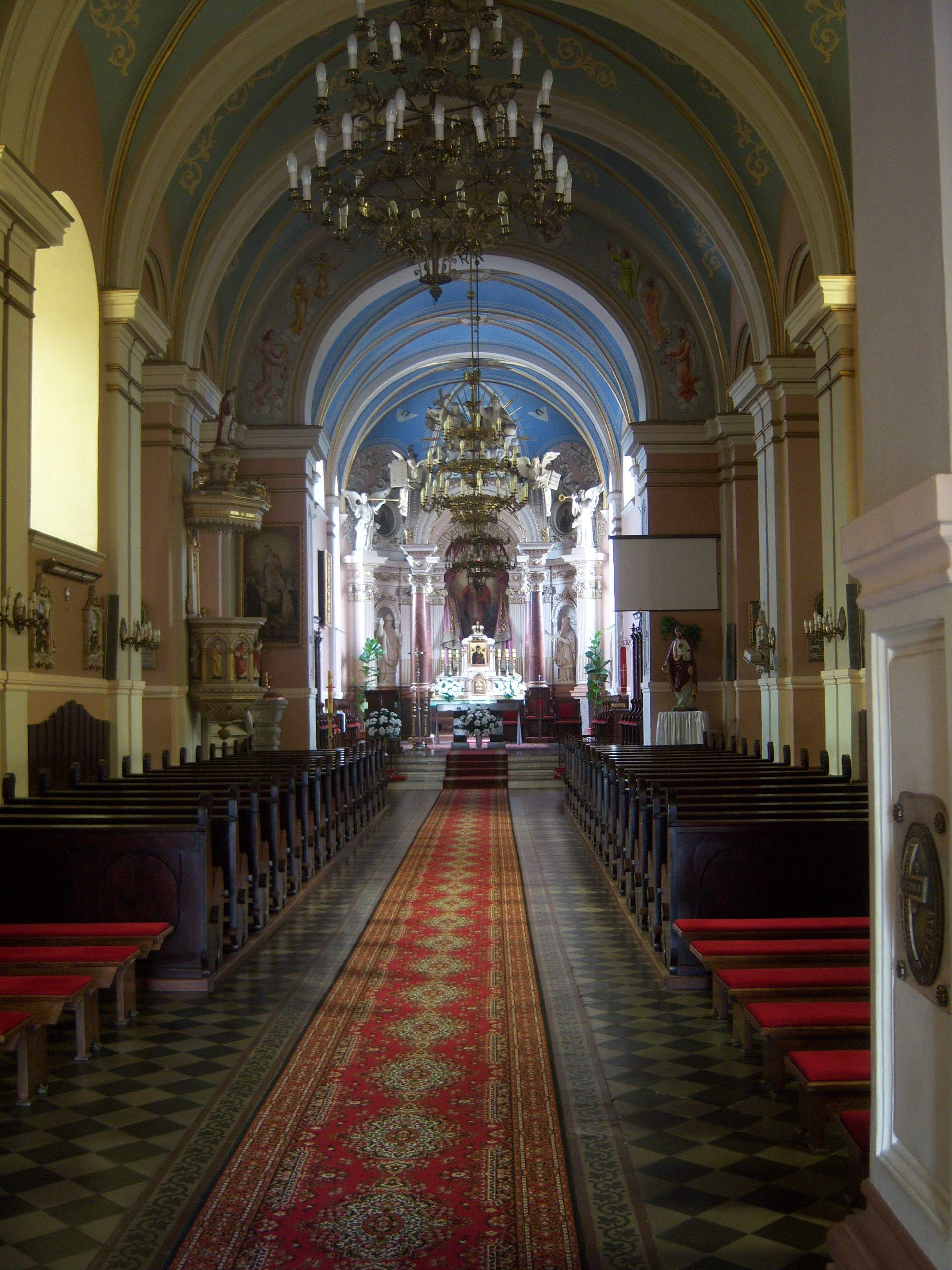
Interior of St. Adalbert's Church

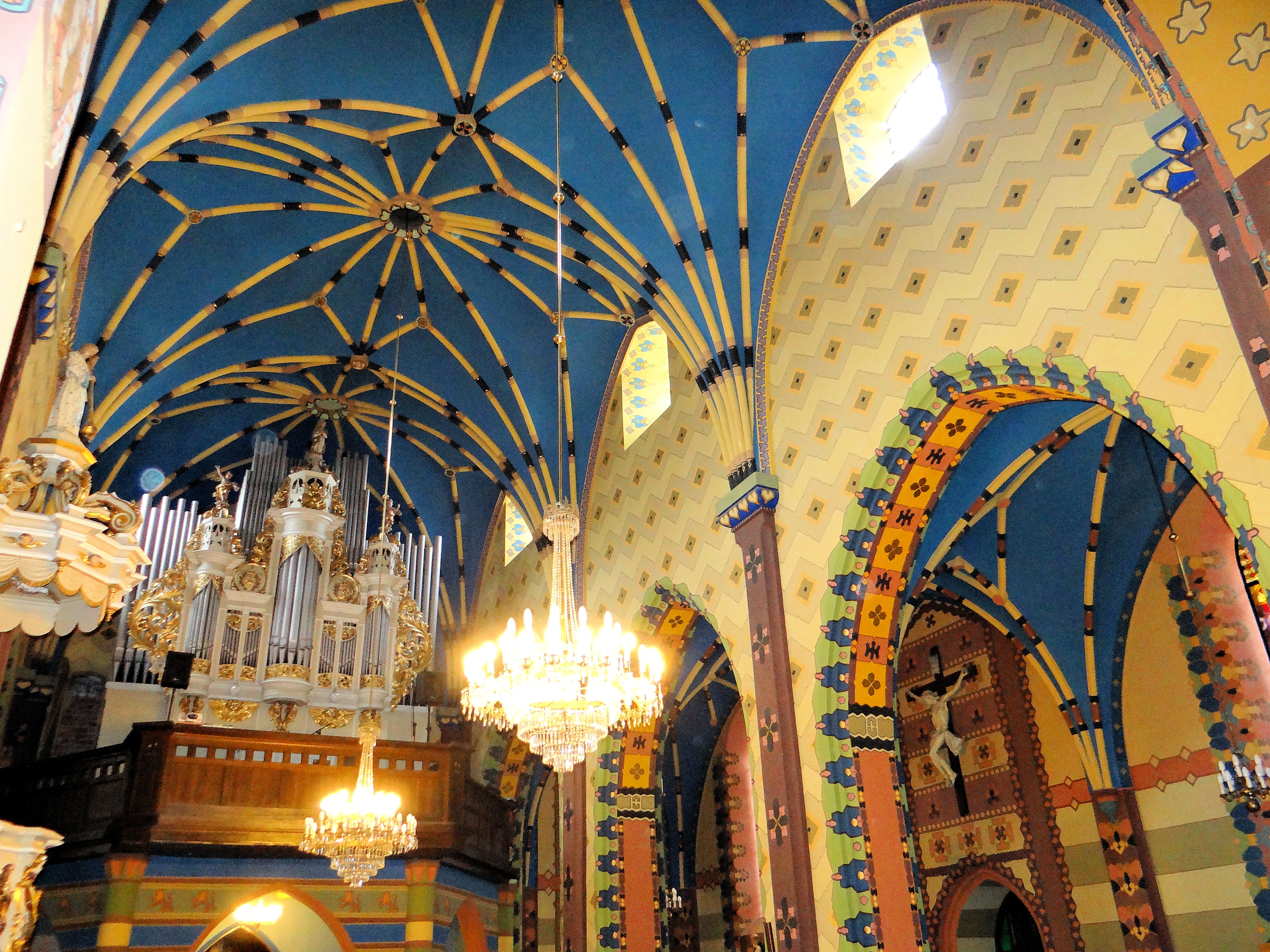
Pipe organ of St. Bartholomew's Church

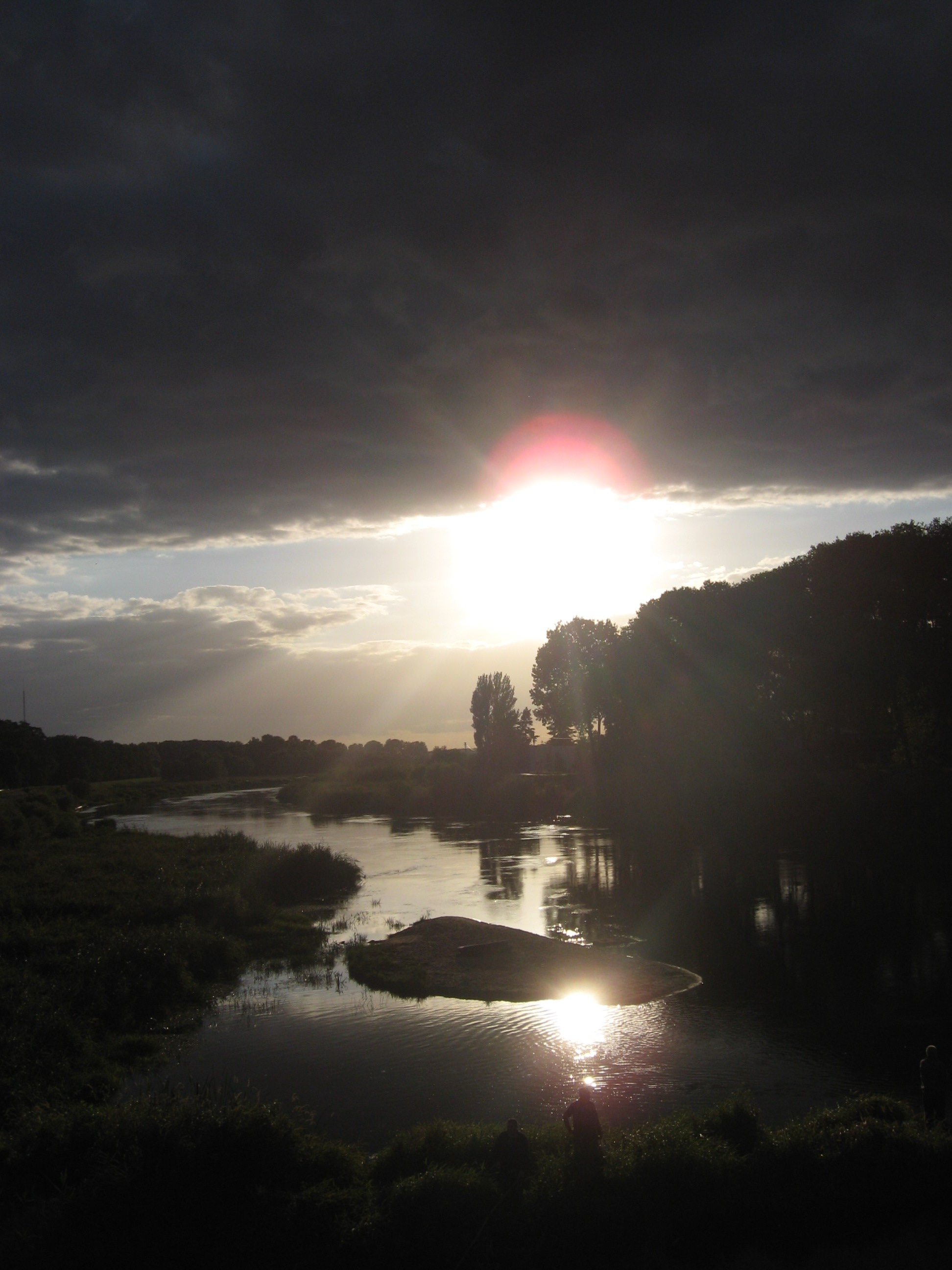
August Sunset, Konin 2008

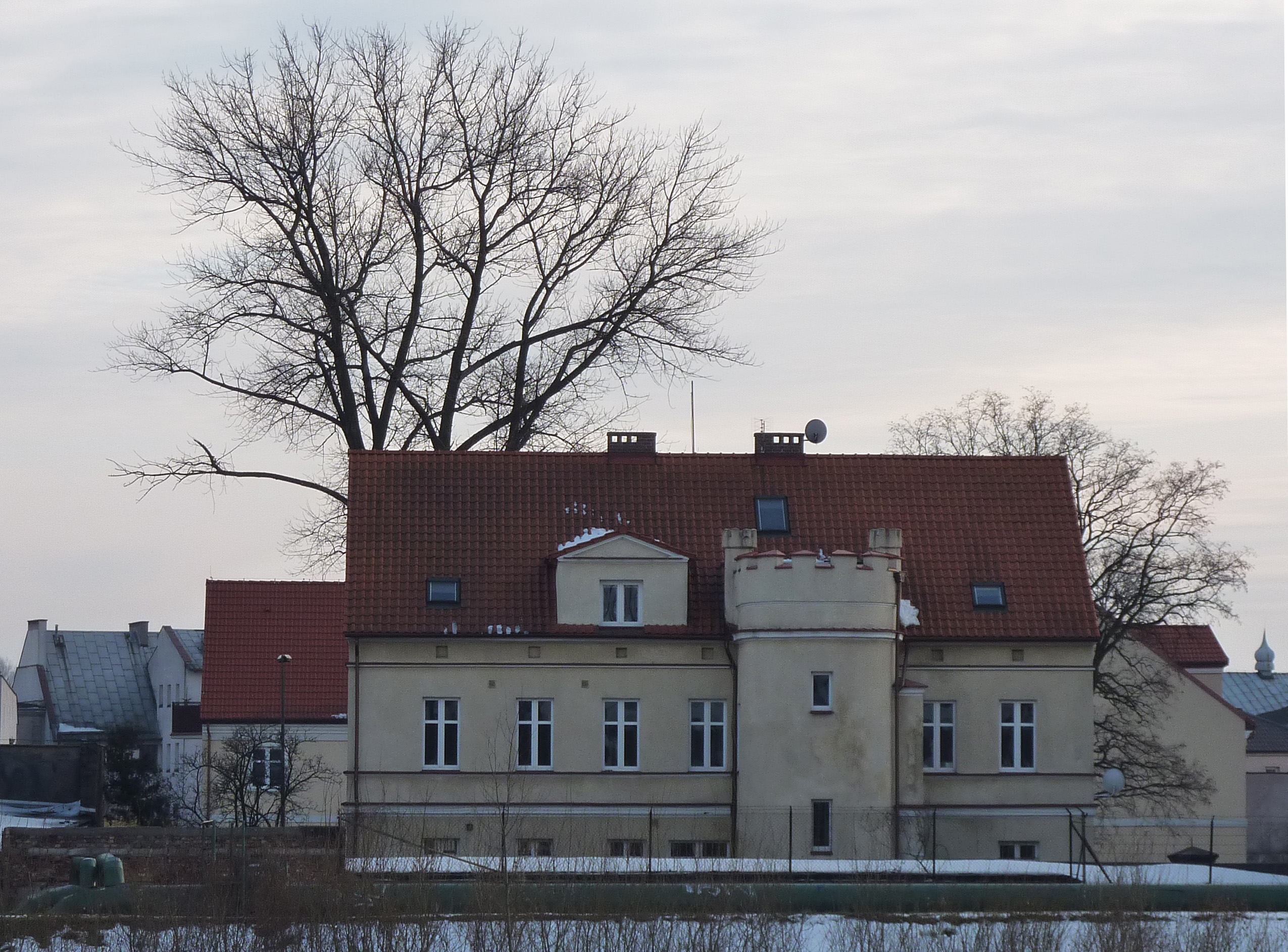
Kasy Powiatowej House, on the Warta

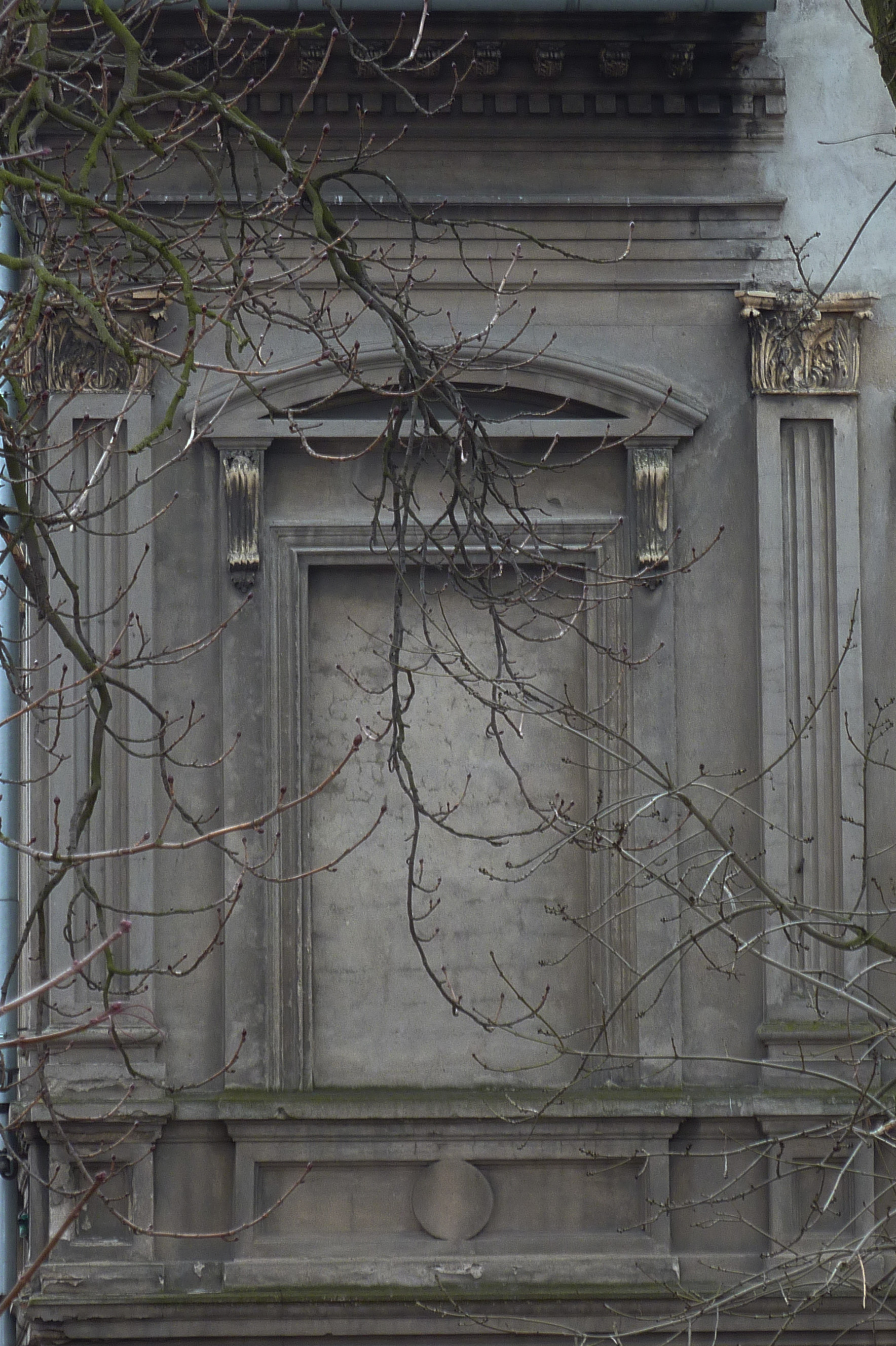
Sikorski Building, Kilińskiego Street

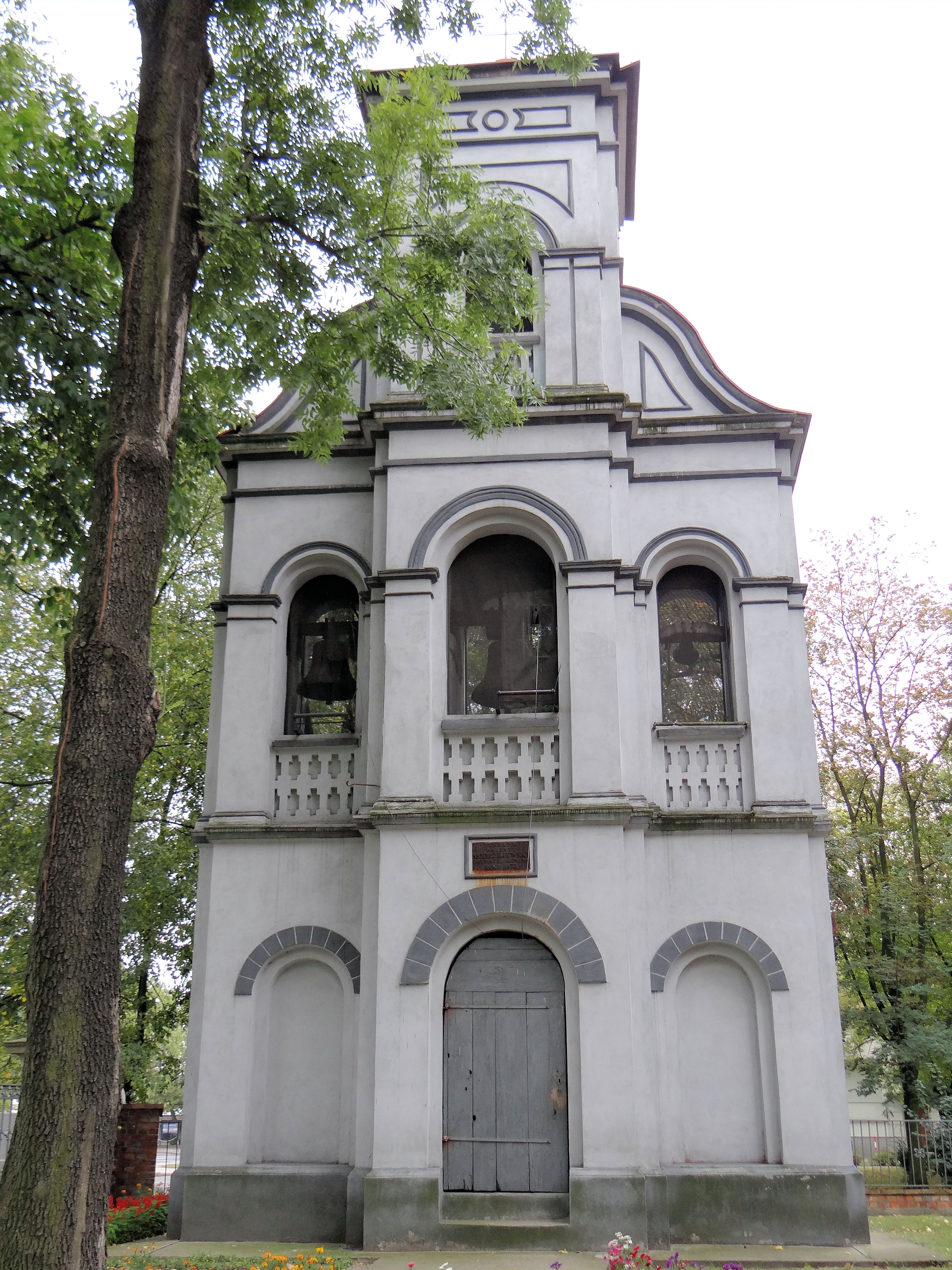
Belfry of St. Bartholomew's Church

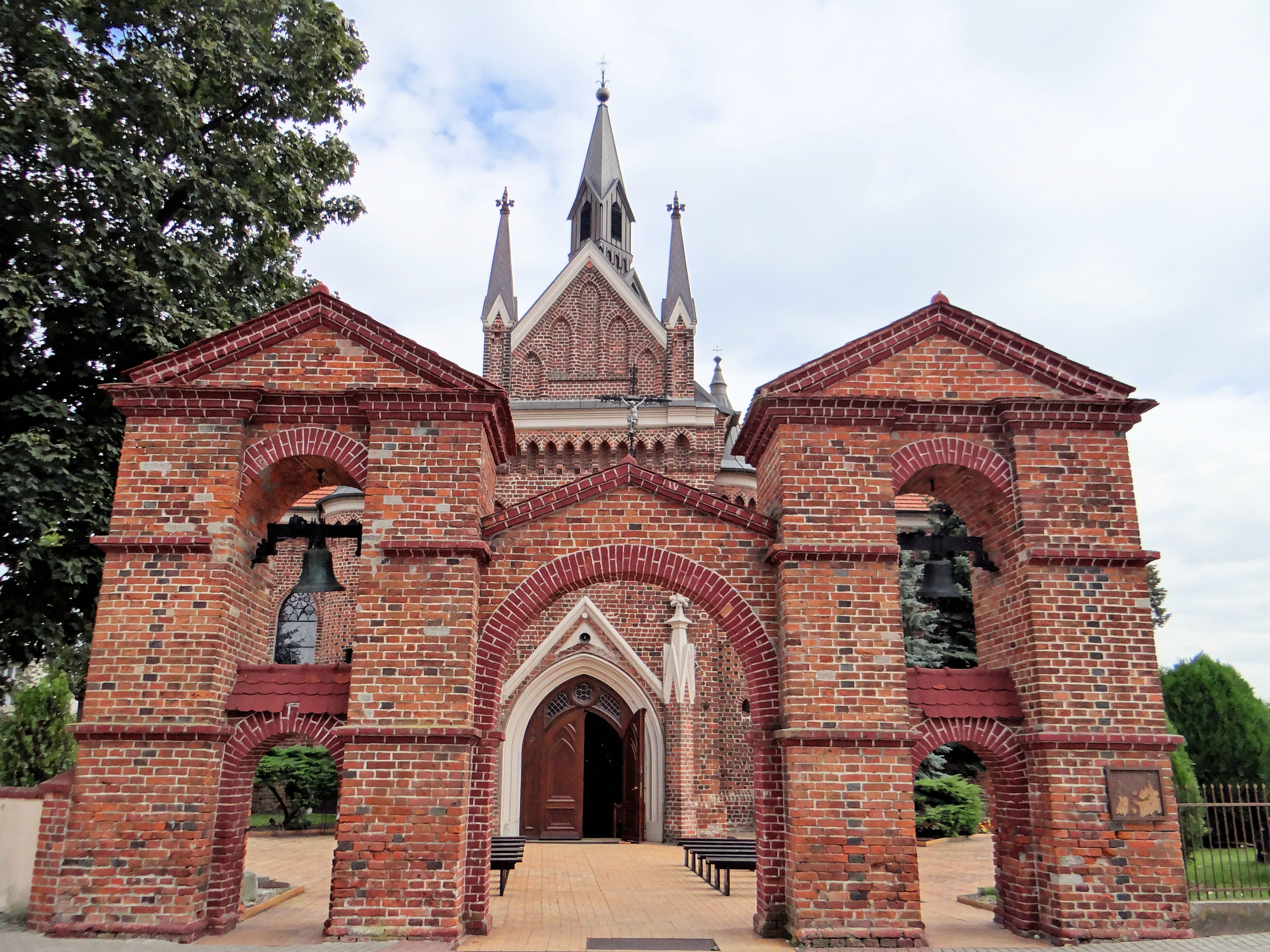
Belfry of St. Andrew's Church

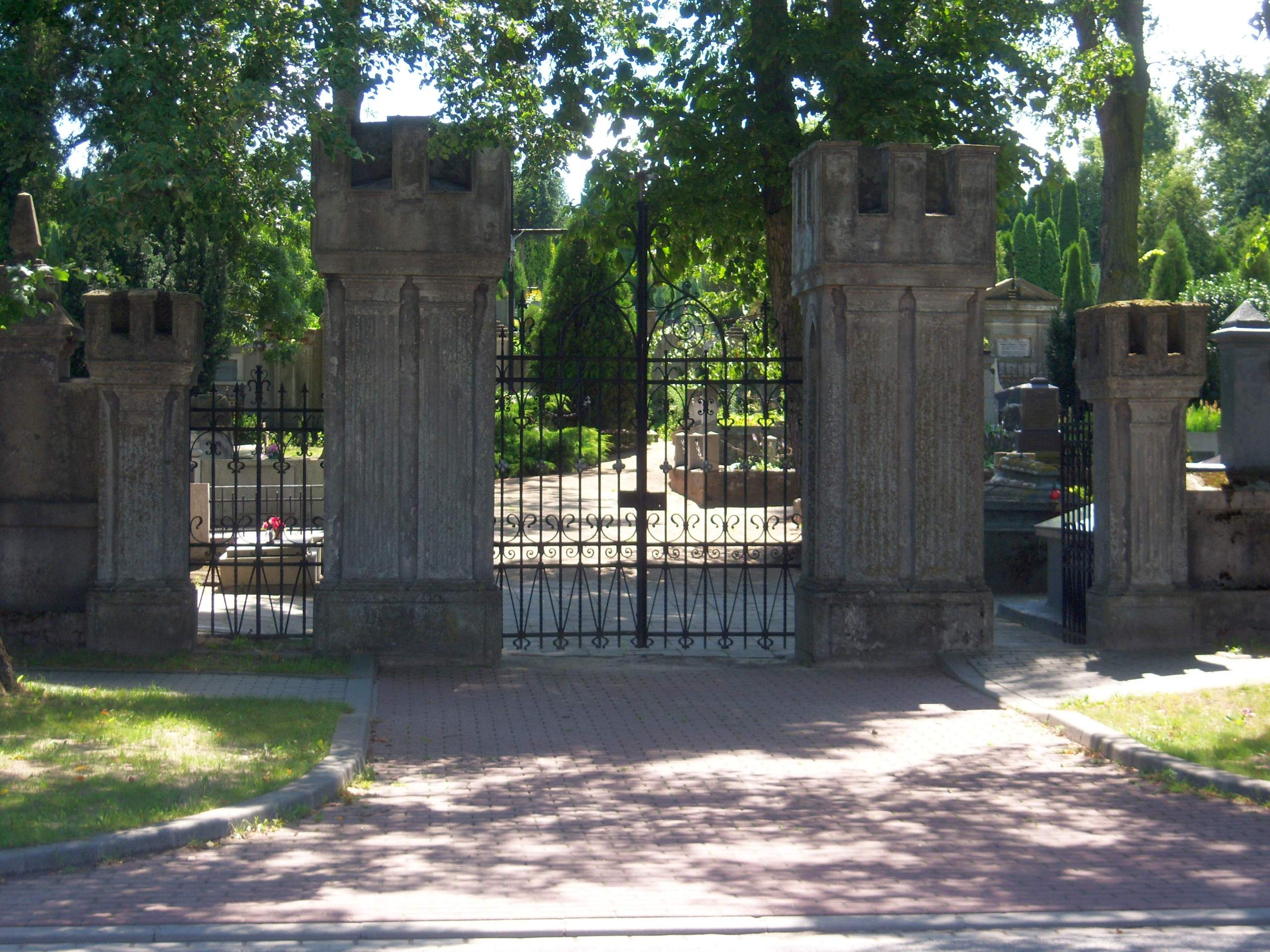
Kolska Street gate of the Lutheran Cemetery

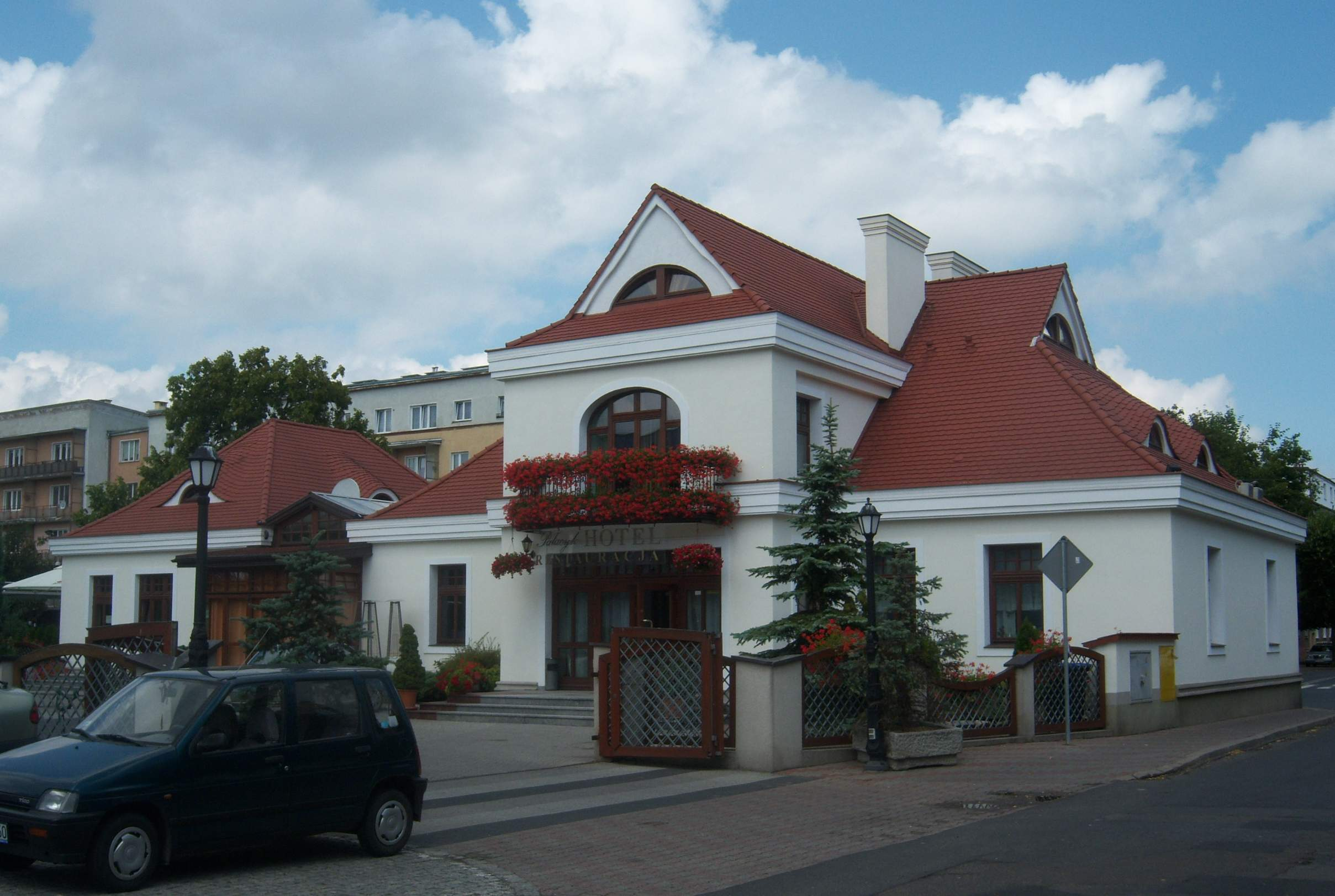
Hotel Pałacyk

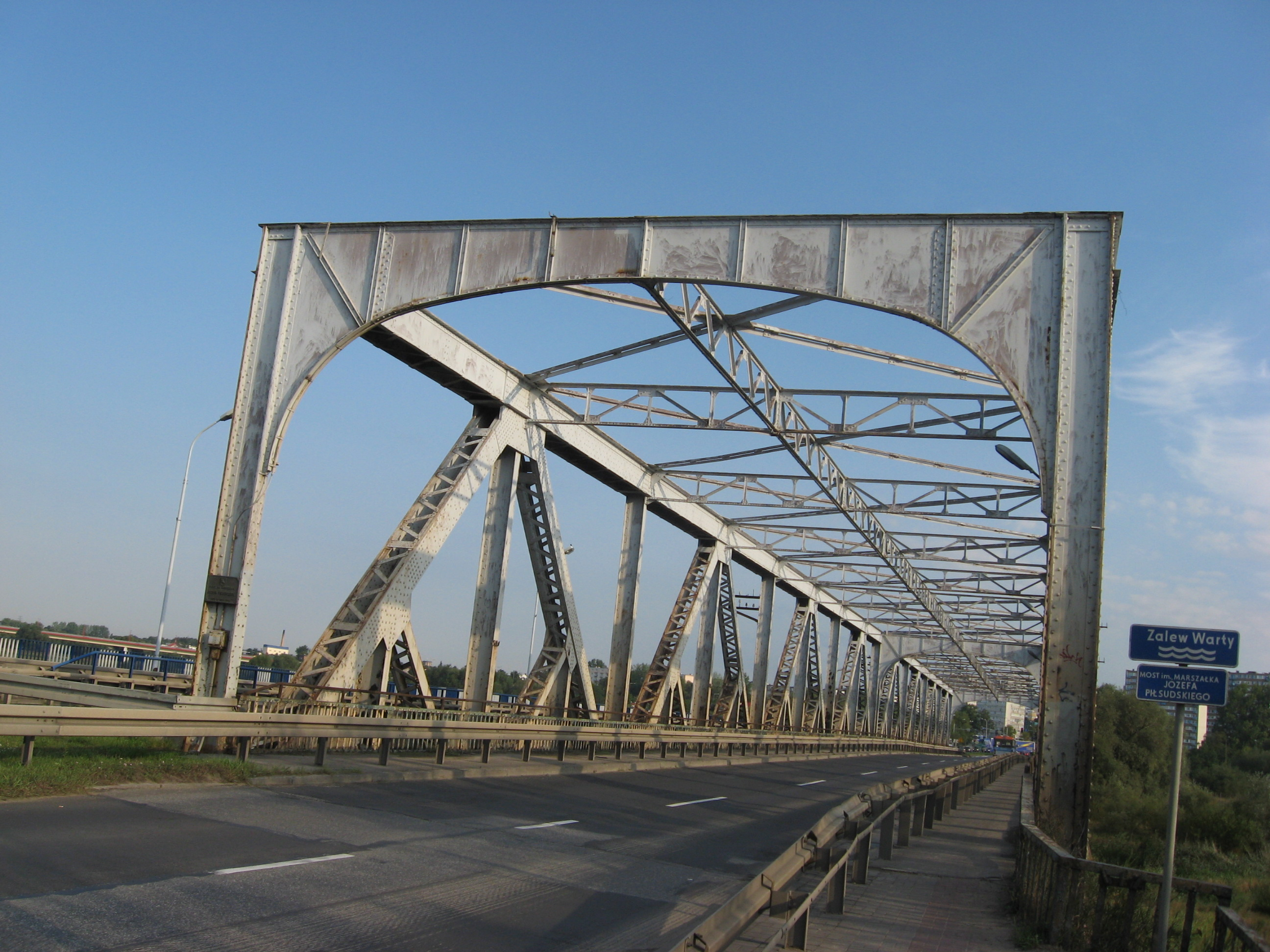
A bridge on Józef Piłsudski Road

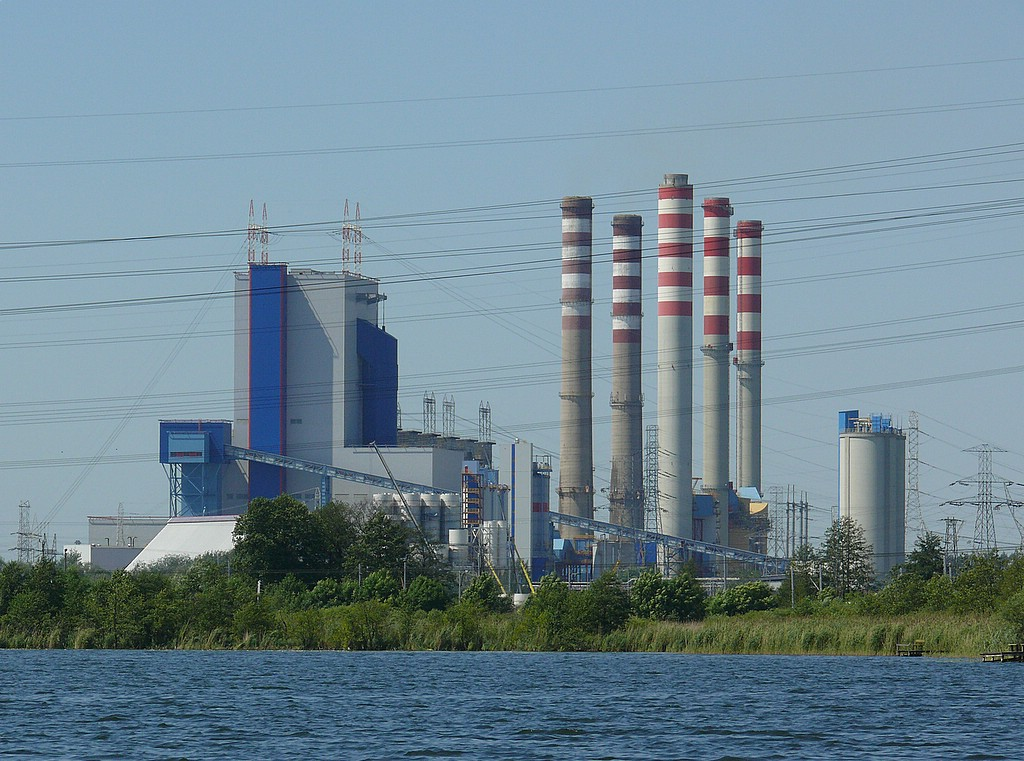
Europe's most modern coal powered plant (2008), in the Pątnów district

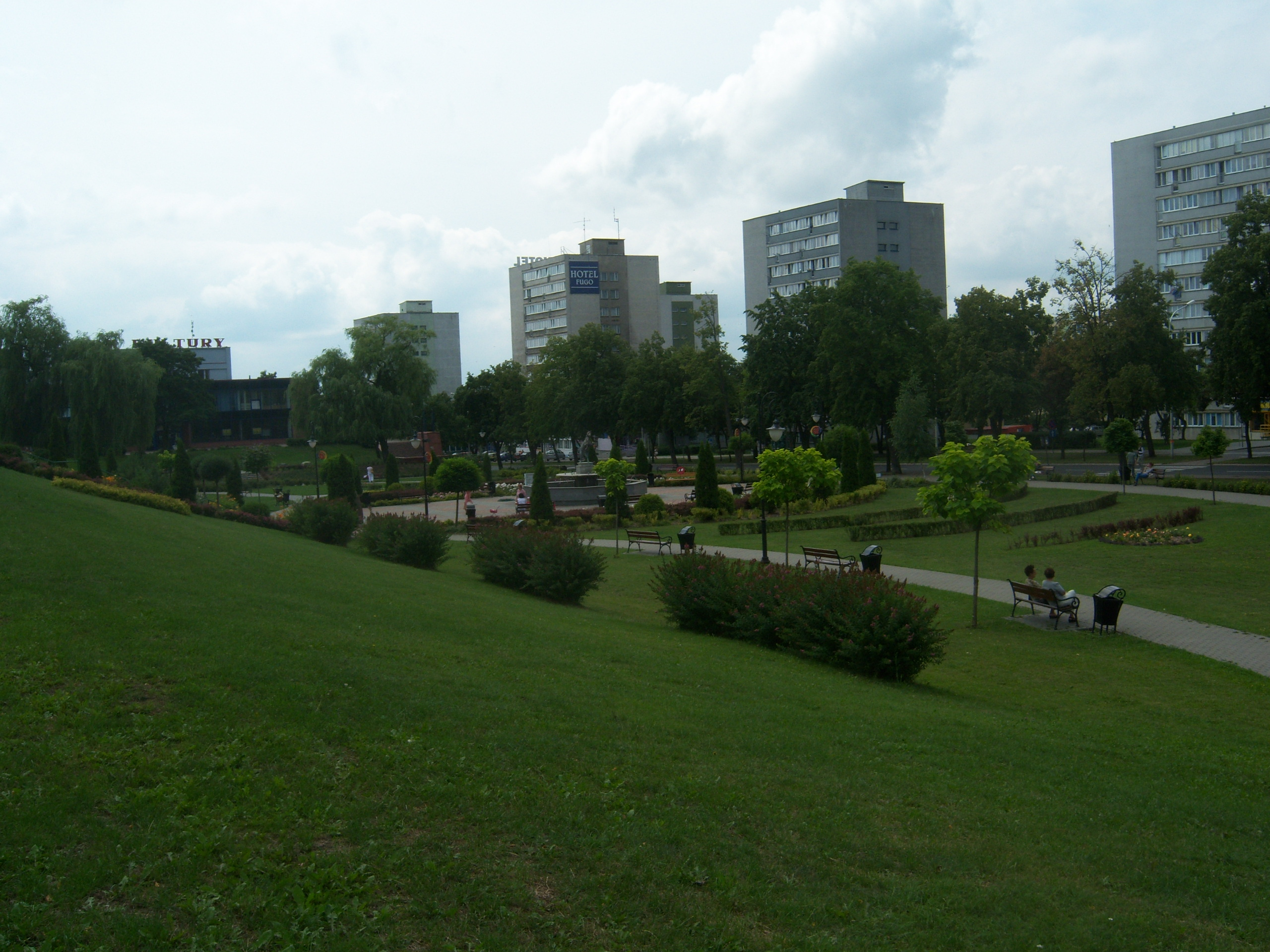
Park at the corner of 1 Maja and Dworcowa Streets

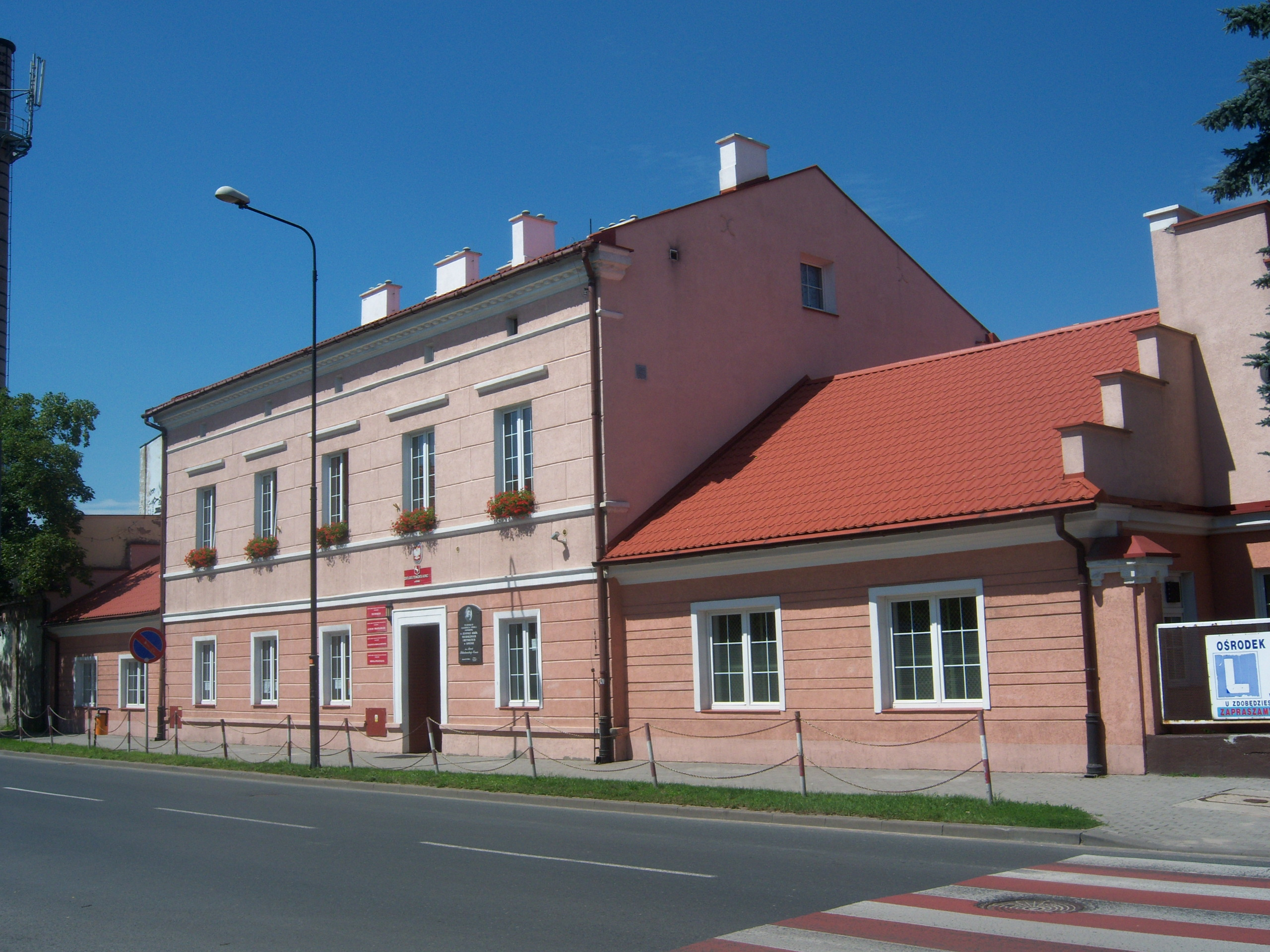
Former hospital in Kolska Street, now a secondary school

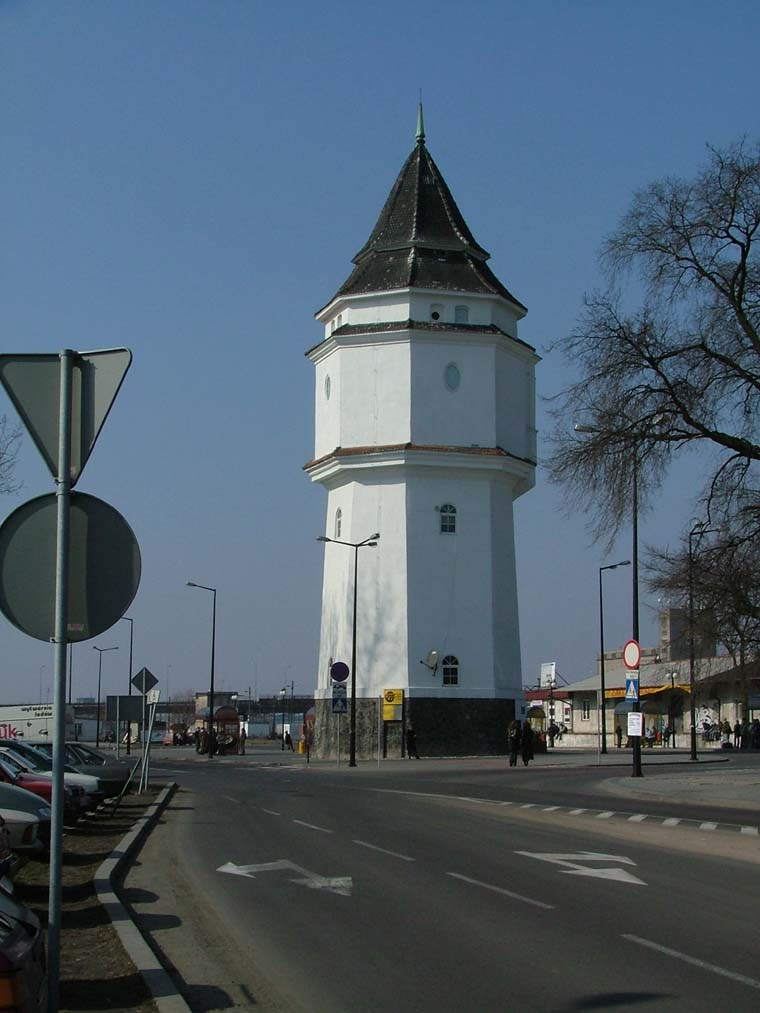
The Old Water Tower

== Transport ==
Konin is a major road junction lying at the intersection of national roads 25, 92 and 72.

The A2 motorway passes to the south of Konin. The Modła and Konin Wschód exits of the motorway provides for quick access to Poznań and Warsaw.

Vovoideship road 266 also comes into Konin.

Konin has a station on the Berlin-Warsaw railway line.

== Education ==
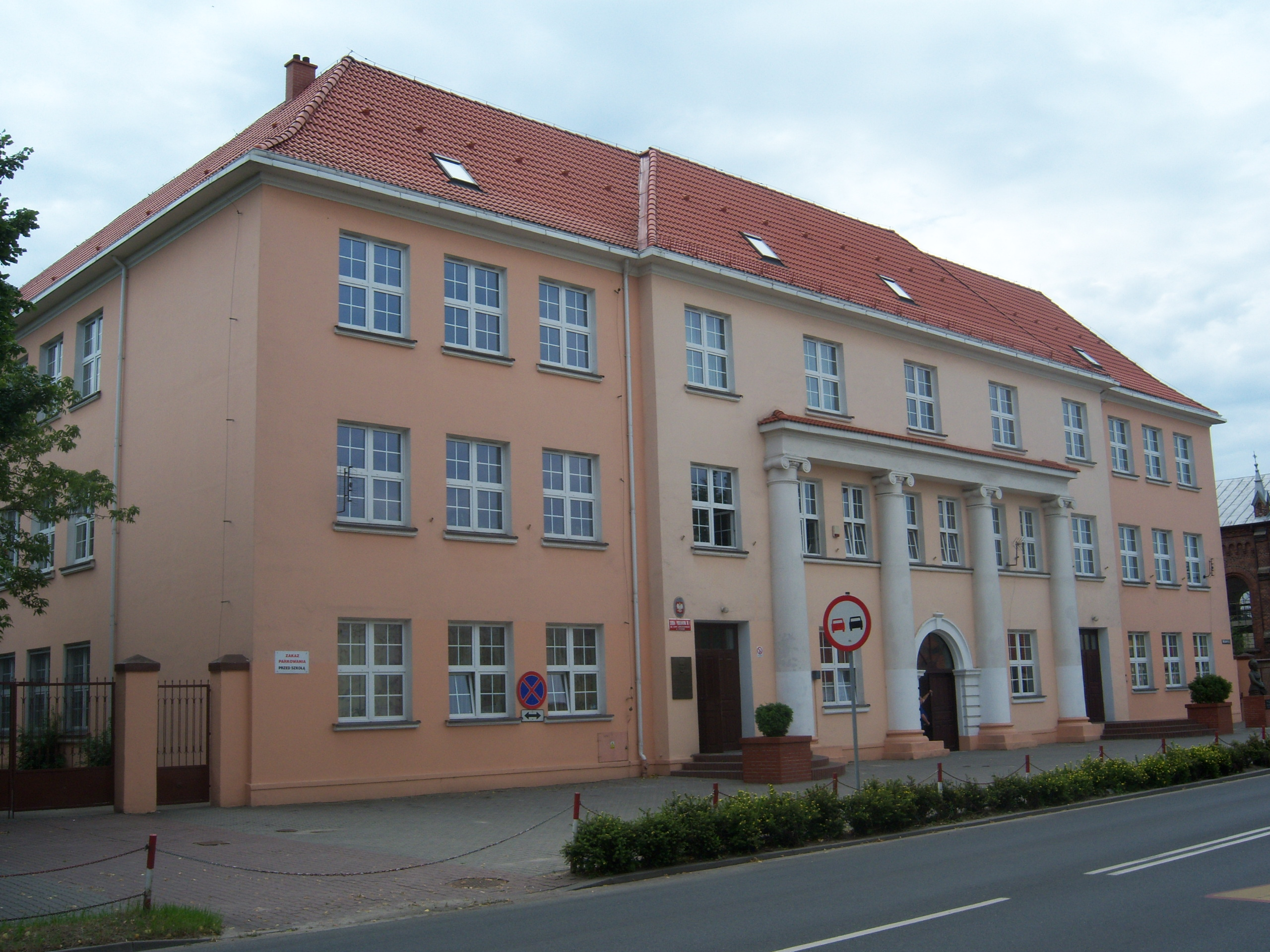
Primary School No. 1

- Wyższa Szkoła Kupiecka in Łódź, branch in Konin
- Akademia Nauk Stosowanych w Koninie (University of Applied Sciences in Konin) - see https://www.ans.konin.pl/
- Akademia Humanistyczno-Ekonomiczna in Łódź, branch in Konin

== Sports ==
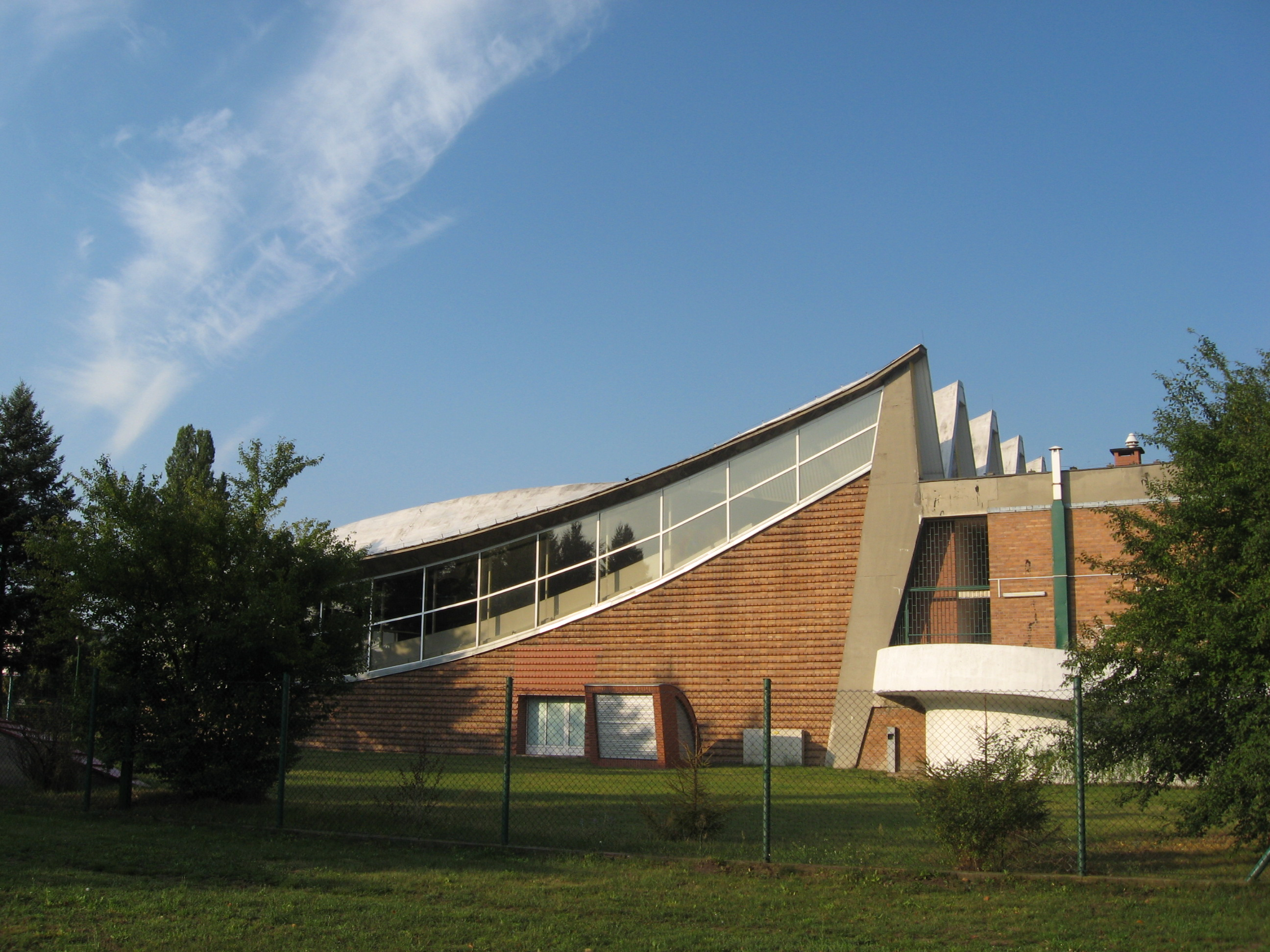
Rondo Hall Centre for Sport, in New Town

- Górnik Konin - football team, currently playing in the Polish fourth division, also playing in the second division in the 1990s and 2000s, 1998 Polish Cup runner-up
- KKPK Medyk Konin - women's football team, playing in the top division, multiple Polish champion

== Greenpeace Climate Rescue Station ==
Greenpeace chose the town to set up its Climate Rescue Station. A four-story energy self-sufficient globe replica was erected beside the Jozwin IIB open-cast coal mine. The location of the Rescue Station was intended to draw attention to Poland's over-reliance on coal and formed part of Greenpeace's campaign to get its message across at the United Nations' global warming Conference in nearby Poznań. The presence of Greenpeace was generally well received by locals who came in the hundreds to participate in activities and listen to lectures about the environmental situation. The Rescue station moved to Poznań following its stay at Konin.

== Politics ==
Members of Parliament (Sejm) elected from Konin constituency

- Paweł Arndt, PO
- Alfred Budner, non-party
- Zbigniew Dolata, PiS
- Eugeniusz Grzeszczak, PSL
- Adam Hofman, PiS
- Tomasz Nowak, PO
- Józef Pilarz, non-party
- Andrzej Ruciński, PiS
- Tadeusz Tomaszewski, SLD

=== International relations ===
==== Twin towns—sister cities ====
Konin is twinned with:

| (United Kingdom) Wakefield, West Yorkshire, England; Herne, North Rhine-Westphalia, Germany; Akmene, Lithuania; Chernivtsi, Ukraine; Ungheni, Moldova | Dobele, Latvia; Hénin-Beaumont, Nord, France; Karlovo, Bulgaria; Santa Susanna, Catalonia, Spain; Sundsvall, Sweden; Joniškis, Lithuania |

=== Former twin towns ===
- Bryansk, Bryansk Oblast, Russia – On March 4, 2022, Konin broke the agreement due to the Russian invasion of Ukraine.

== Notable people ==
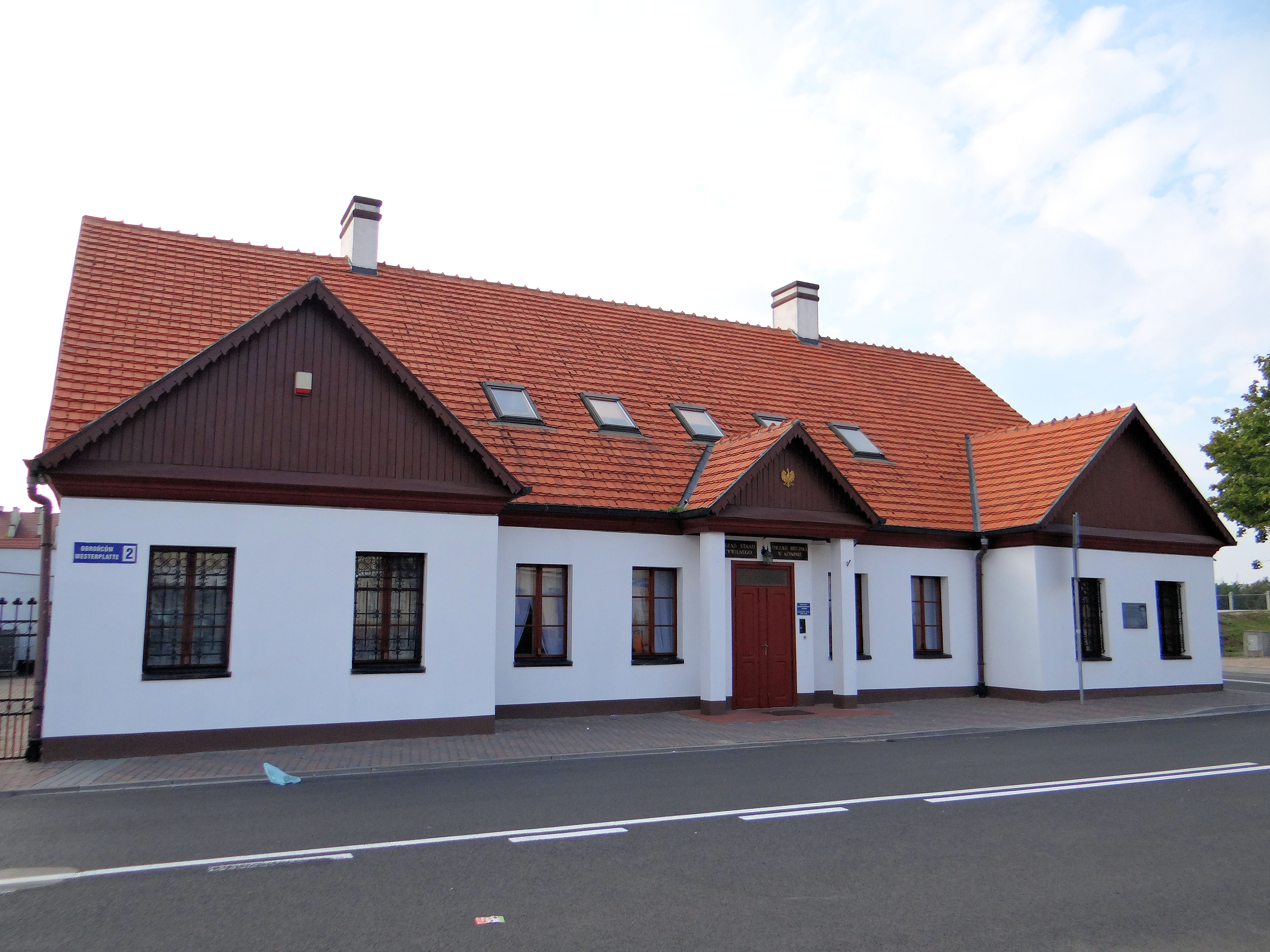
House of writer Zofia Urbanowska

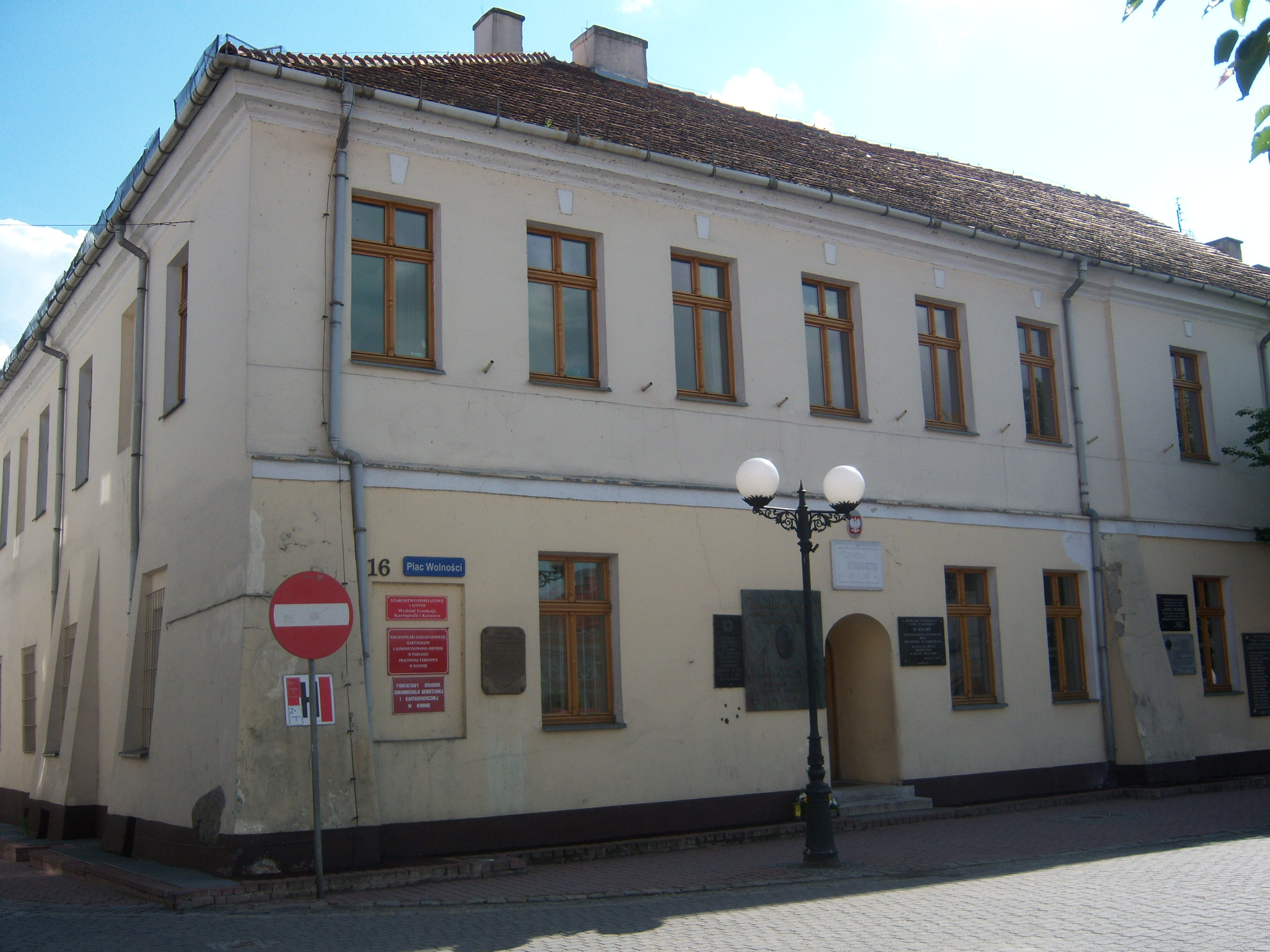
House of 16th-century physician Jan Zemełka

- Mieczysław G. Bekker (1905–1989), Polish engineer and scientist
- Krystian Bielik (born 1998), Polish Footballer
- Szymon Bobrowski (born 1972), Polish actor
- Antoni Czubiński (1928–2003), Polish historian
- Julius Fromm (1883–1945), Polish-German entrepreneur, chemist and inventor
- Gosław, first known chief officer of group of settlers in Konin from 1293 CE
- Leopold Infeld (1898–1968), Polish physicist
- Marcin Kamiński (born 1992), Polish footballer
- Jarosław Iwaszkiewicz (1894–1980), Polish poet, essayist, dramatist and writer
- Reni Jusis (born 1974), Polish pop singer, songwriter and producer
- Jan A. P. Kaczmarek (born 1953), Polish Academy Award-winning composer
- Józef Lewandowski (1923–2007), Polish-born Swedish historian
- Przemysł II (1257–1296), Polish ruler who possibly founded the town of Konin by signing up a charter to settlers in 1284 CE, or 1292 CE
