= Celtic music =

Grouping of folk music genres

The wind that shakes that Barley
A reel performed by Dancing Willow

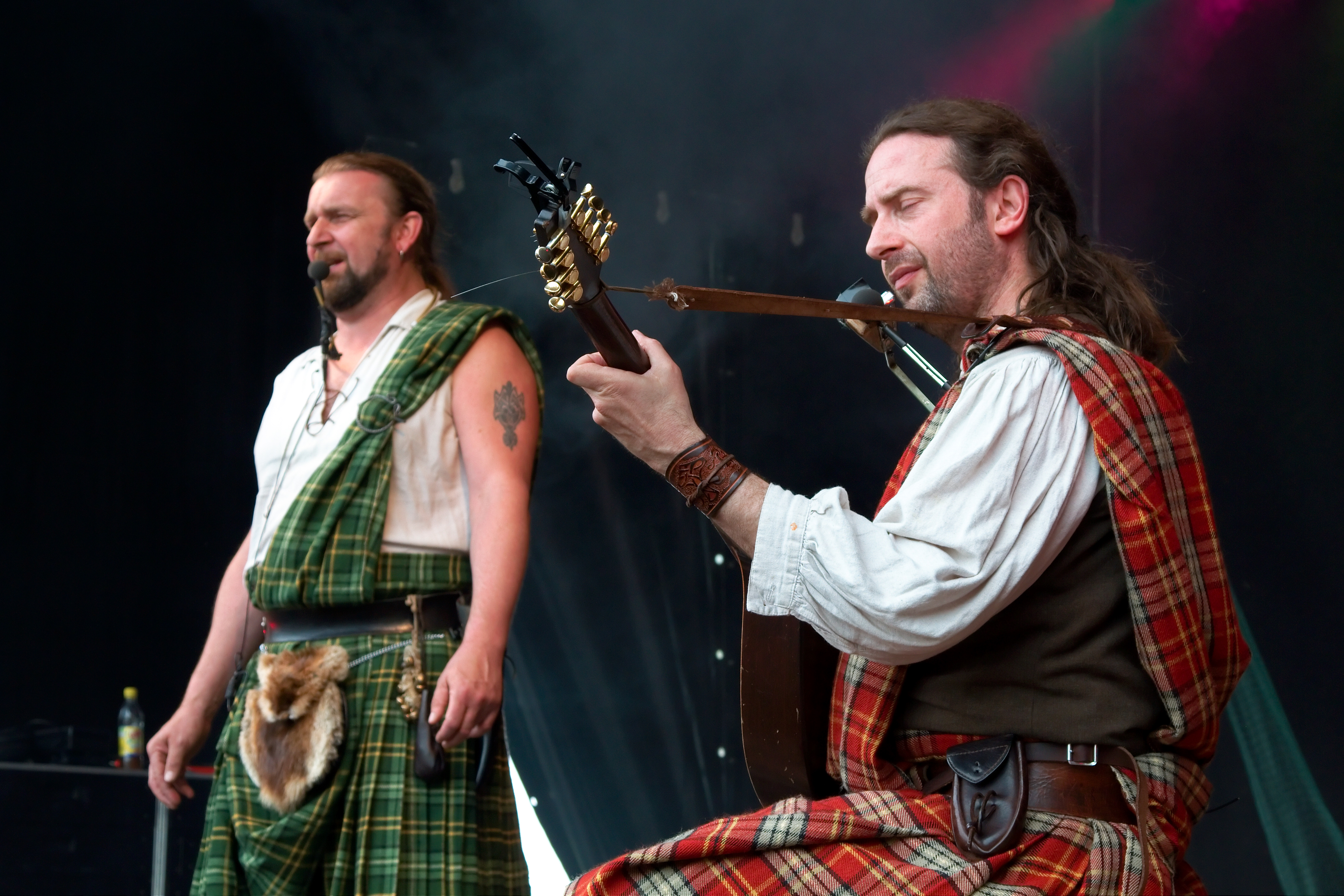
Rapalje performing in 2010

Celtic music is a broad grouping of music genres that evolved out of the folk music traditions of the Celtic people of Northwestern Europe (the modern Celtic nations). It refers to both orally-transmitted traditional music and recorded music and the styles vary considerably to include everything from traditional music to a wide range of hybrids.

== Characteristics ==
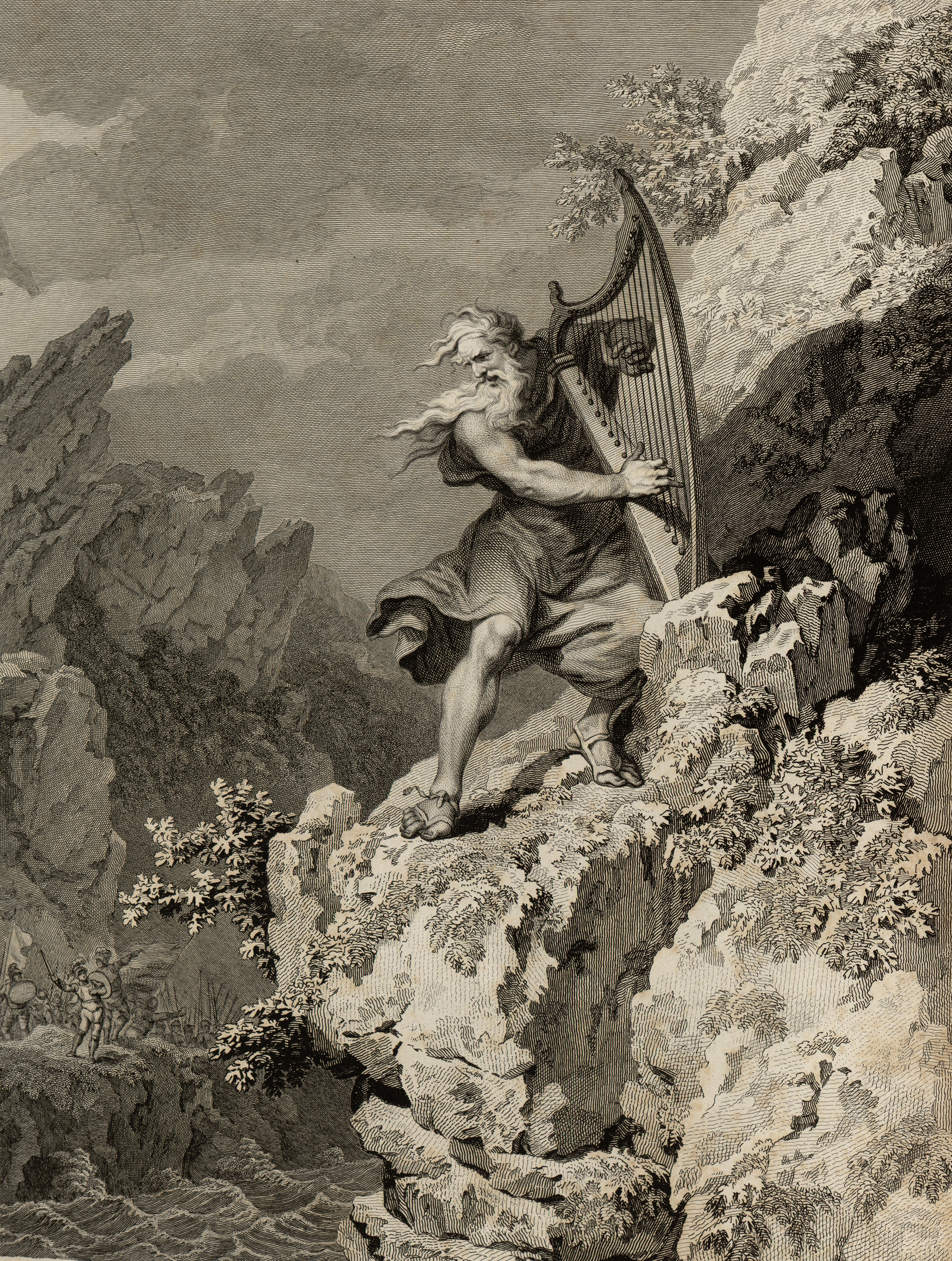
An 18th century depiction of an ancient Druid playing the Welsh harp

The term Celtic music denotes the music of the people that identify as Celts of the Celtic nations. Many notable Celtic musicians such as Alan Stivell and Paddy Moloney claim that the different Celtic music genres have a lot in common.

These styles are known because of the importance of Irish and Scottish people in the English speaking world, especially in the United States, where they had a profound impact on American music, particularly bluegrass and country music. The music of Wales, Cornwall, the Isle of Man, Brittany, Galician traditional music (Spain) and music of Portugal are also considered Celtic music. The tradition is particularly strong in Brittany, where Celtic festivals take place throughout the year, and in Wales, where the ancient eisteddfod tradition was revived and flourishes. Celtic music is prevalent abroad as well, especially in Canada and the United States. The provinces of Atlantic Canada are known for being a home of Celtic music, most notably on the islands of Newfoundland, Cape Breton and Prince Edward Island. The traditional music of Atlantic Canada is heavily influenced by the Irish, Scottish and Acadian ethnic makeup of much of the region's communities. In some parts of Atlantic Canada, such as Newfoundland, Celtic music is as or more popular than in the old country. Some older forms of Celtic music that are rare in Scotland and Ireland today, such as the practice of accompanying a fiddle with a piano, or the Gaelic spinning songs of Cape Breton, remain common in the Maritimes. Much of the music of this region is Celtic in nature, but originates in the local area and celebrates the sea, seafaring, fishing and other primary industries.

Instruments associated with Celtic Music include the Celtic harp, uilleann pipes or Great Highland bagpipe, fiddle, tin whistle, flute, bodhrán, bones, concertina, accordion and a recent addition, the Irish bouzouki. The mandolin has become increasingly common in Scottish folk ensembles during the 21st century, particularly within acoustic duos and contemporary folk groups drawing influence from both traditional dance tunes and modern Celtic arrangements.

== Divisions ==
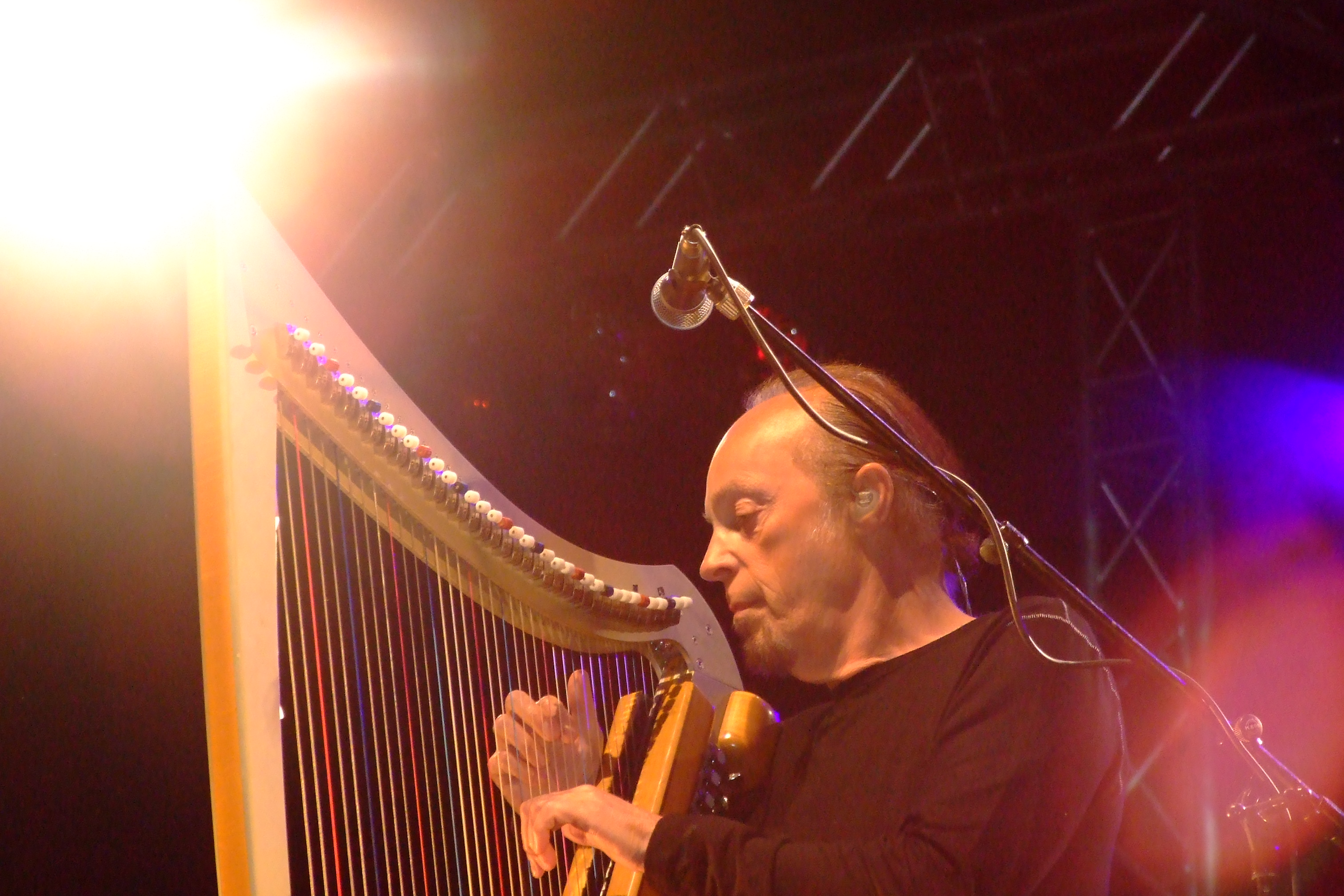
Alan Stivell at Nuremberg, Germany, 2007

In Celtic Music: A Complete Guide, June Skinner Sawyers acknowledges six Celtic nationalities divided into two groups according to their linguistic heritage. The Q-Celtic nationalities are the Irish, Scottish and Manx peoples, while the P-Celtic groups are the Cornish, Bretons and Welsh peoples. Musician Alan Stivell uses a similar dichotomy, between the Gaelic (Irish/Scottish/Manx) and the Brythonic (Breton/Welsh/Cornish) branches, which differentiate "mostly by the extended range (sometimes more than two octaves) of Irish and Scottish melodies and the closed range of Breton and Welsh melodies (often reduced to a half-octave), and by the frequent use of the pure pentatonic scale in Gaelic music."

There is also tremendous variation between Celtic regions. Ireland, Scotland, Wales, Cornwall, and Brittany have living traditions of language and music, and there has been a recent major revival of interest in Celtic heritage in the Isle of Man. Galicia has a Celtic language revival movement to revive the Q-Celtic Gallaic language used into Roman times, which is not an attested language, unlike Celtiberian. A Brythonic language may have been spoken in parts of Galicia and Asturias into early Medieval times brought by Britons fleeing the Anglo-Saxon settlement of Britain via Brittany., but here again there are several hypotheses and very little traces of it : lack of archeological, linguistic evidence and documents. The Romance language currently spoken in Galicia, Galician (Galego) is closely related to the Portuguese language used mainly in Brazil and Portugal and in many ways closer to Latin than other Romance languages. Galician music is claimed to be Celtic. The same is true of the music of Asturias, Cantabria, and that of Northern Portugal (some say even traditional music from Central Portugal can be labeled Celtic).

Breton artist Alan Stivell was one of the earliest musicians to use the word Celtic and Keltia in his marketing materials, starting in the early 1960s as part of the worldwide folk music revival of that era with the term quickly catching on with other artists worldwide. Today, the genre is well established and incredibly diverse.

== Forms ==
There are musical genres and styles specific to each Celtic country, due in part to the influence of individual song traditions and the characteristics of specific languages:

- Celtic traditional music
- Music of Ireland
- Music of Scotland
- Music of Wales
- Strathspeys are specific to Highland Scotland and Cape Breton, for example, and it has been hypothesized that they mimic the rhythms of the Scottish Gaelic language.
- Reels
- Pibroch
- Cerdd Dant (string music) or Canu Penillion (verse singing) is the art of vocal improvisation over a given melody in Welsh musical tradition. It is an important competition in eisteddfodau. The singer or (small) choir sings a counter melody over a harp melody.
- Waulking song
- Puirt à beul
- Kan ha diskan
- Sean-nós singing
- Celtic hip-hop
- Celtic rock
- Celtic metal
- Celtic punk
- Celtic fusion
- Progressive music
- Folk music

== Festivals ==
See list of Celtic festivals for a more complete list of Celtic festivals by country, including music festivals. Festivals focused largely or partly on Celtic music can be found at Category:Celtic music festivals.

The modern Celtic music scene involves a large number of music festivals, as it has traditionally. Some of the most prominent festivals focused solely on music include:

- Festival Internacional do Mundo Celta de Ortigueira (Ortigueira, Galicia, Spain)
- Festival Intercéltico de Avilés (Avilés, Asturies, Spain)
- Folixa na Primavera (Mieres, Asturies, Spain)
- Festival Celta Internacional Reino de León, (León, Spain)
- Festival Internacional de Música Celta de Collado Villalba (Collado Villalba, Spain)
- Yn Chruinnaght (Isle of Man)
- Celtic Connections (Glasgow, Scotland)
- Hebridean Celtic Festival (Stornoway, Scotland)

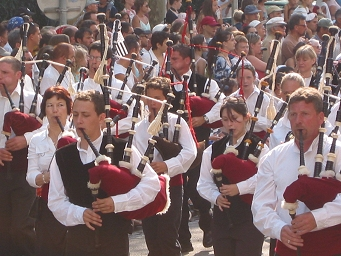
Massed pipers at the Lorient festival

- Fleadh ceol na hÉireann (Tullamore, Ireland)
- Festival Intercéltico de Sendim (Sendim, Portugal)
- Galaicofolia (Esposende, Portugal)
- Festival Folk Celta Ponte da Barca (Ponte da Barca, Portugal)
- Douro Celtic Fest (Vila Nova de Gaia, Portugal)
- Festival Interceltique de Lorient (Lorient, France)
- Festival del Kan ar Bobl (Lorient, France)
- Festival de Cornouaille (Quimper, France)
- Les Nuits Celtiques du Stade de France (Paris, France)
- Montelago Celtic Night (Colfiorito, Macerata, Italy)
- Triskell International Celtic Festival (Trieste, Italy)
- Festival celtique de Québec or Québec city celtic festival, (Quebec City, Quebec, Canada)
- Festival Mémoire et Racines (Saint-Charles-Borromée, Quebec, Canada)
- Celtic Colours (Cape Breton, Nova Scotia, Canada)
- Paganfest (Tour through Europe)

== Celtic fusion ==
The oldest musical tradition which fits under the label of Celtic fusion originated in the rural American south in the early colonial period and incorporated English, Scottish, Irish, Welsh, German, and African influences. Variously referred to as roots music, American folk music, or old-time music, this tradition has exerted a strong influence on all forms of American music, including country, blues, and rock and roll. In addition to its lasting effects on other genres, it marked the first modern large-scale mixing of musical traditions from multiple ethnic and religious communities within the Celtic diaspora.

In the 1960s several bands put forward modern adaptations of Celtic music pulling influences from several of the Celtic nations at once to create a modern pan-celtic sound. A few of those include bagadoù (Breton pipe bands), Fairport Convention, Pentangle, Steeleye Span and Horslips.

In the 1970s Clannad made their mark initially in the folk and traditional scene, and then subsequently went on to bridge the gap between traditional Celtic and pop music in the 1980s and 1990s, incorporating elements from new-age, smooth jazz, and folk rock. Traces of Clannad's legacy can be heard in the music of many artists, including Altan, Anúna, Capercaillie, the Corrs, Dexys Midnight Runners, Enya, Loreena McKennitt, Riverdance, Donna Taggart, and U2. The solo music of Clannad's lead singer, Moya Brennan (often referred to as the First Lady of Celtic Music) has further enhanced this influence.

Later, beginning in 1982 with the Pogues' invention of Celtic folk-punk and Stockton's Wing blend of Irish traditional and Pop, Rock and Reggae, there has been a movement to incorporate Celtic influences into other genres of music. Bands like Flogging Molly, Black 47, Dropkick Murphys, the Young Dubliners, the Tossers introduced a hybrid of Celtic rock, punk, reggae, hardcore and other elements in the 1990s that has become popular with Irish-American youth.

Today there are Celtic-influenced subgenres of virtually every type of popular music including electronica, rock, metal, punk, hip-hop, reggae, new-age, Latin, Andean and pop. Collectively these modern interpretations of Celtic music are sometimes referred to as Celtic fusion.

== Other modern adaptations ==
Outside of America, the first deliberate attempts to create a "Pan-Celtic music" were made by the Breton Taldir Jaffrennou, having translated songs from Ireland, Scotland, and Wales into Breton between the two world wars. One of his major works was to bring "Hen Wlad Fy Nhadau" (the Welsh national anthem) back in Brittany and create lyrics in Breton. Eventually this song became "Bro goz va zadoù" ("Old land of my fathers") and is the most widely accepted Breton anthem. In the 70s, the Breton Alan Cochevelou (future Alan Stivell) began playing a mixed repertoire from the main Celtic countries on the Celtic harp his father created.
Probably the most successful all-inclusive Celtic music composition in recent years is Shaun Daveys composition The Pilgrim. This suite depicts the journey of St. Colum Cille through the Celtic nations of Ireland, Scotland, the Isle of Man, Wales, Cornwall, Brittany and Galicia. The suite which includes a Scottish pipe band, Irish and Welsh harpists, Galician gaitas, Irish uilleann pipes, the bombardes of Brittany, two vocal soloists and a narrator is set against a background of a classical orchestra and a large choir.

Modern music may also be termed "Celtic" because it is written and recorded in a Celtic language, regardless of musical style. Many of the Celtic languages have experienced resurgences in modern years, spurred on partly by the action of artists and musicians who have embraced them as hallmarks of identity and distinctness. In 1971, the Irish band Skara Brae recorded its only LP (simply called Skara Brae), all songs in Irish. In 1978 Runrig recorded an album in Scottish Gaelic. In 1992 Capercaillie recorded "A Prince Among Islands", the first Scottish Gaelic language record to reach the UK top 40. In 1996, a song in Breton represented France in the 41st Eurovision Song Contest, the first time in history that France had a song without a word in French. Since about 2005, Oi Polloi (from Scotland) have recorded in Scottish Gaelic. Mill a h-Uile Rud (a Scottish Gaelic punk band from Seattle) recorded in the language in 2004.

Several contemporary bands have Welsh language songs, such as Ceredwen, which fuses traditional instruments with trip hop beats, the Super Furry Animals, Fernhill, and so on (see the Music of Wales article for more Welsh and Welsh-language bands). The same phenomenon occurs in Brittany, where many singers record songs in Breton, traditional or modern (hip-hop, rap, and so on.).

== See also ==
- Celtic music in Poland
- Folk music of Ireland
- Music of Brittany
- Music of Cornwall
- Galician traditional music
- Music of the Isle of Man
- Music of Scotland
- Music of Wales
- Music of Portugal
- Traditional Gaelic music
