= Scottish diaspora =

Emigrants from Scotland and their descendants

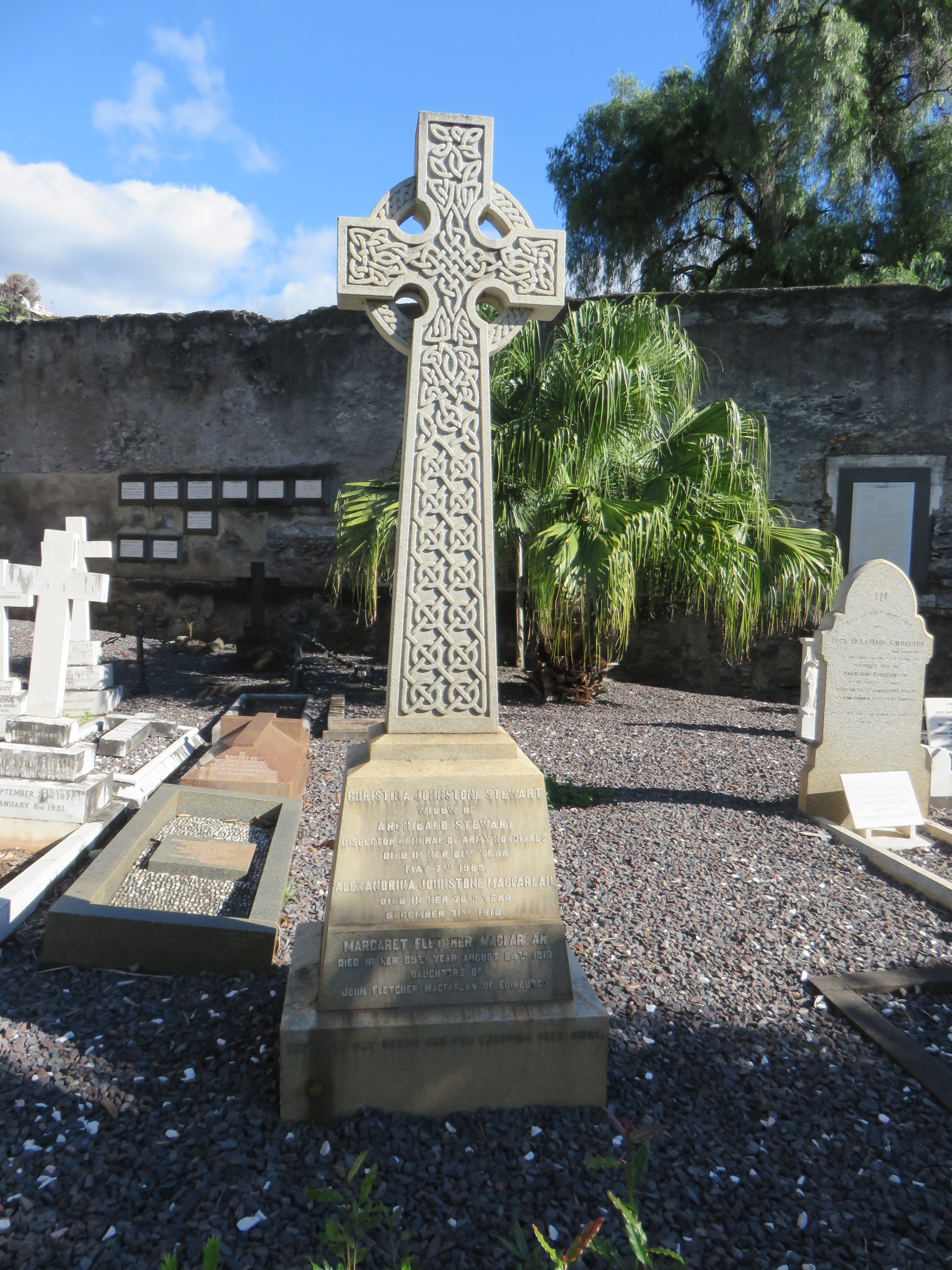
- Grave of the MacFarland sisters of Edinburgh, British Cemetery of Funchal, Madeira

Total population
- c. 28–40 million worldwide^{A}

Regions with significant populations
- Scotland 4,446,000 (2011) (Scottish descent only.)
- United States^{B}: 8,500,000
- Canada^{C}: 4,719,850
- Australia^{H}: 2,176,777
- England^{D}: 795,000
- Argentina: 200,000
- Brazil: 80,000
- France: 45,000
- Poland: 15,000
- New Zealand^{F}: 12,792
- South Africa^{F}: 11,160
- Isle of Man: 2,403
- Hong Kong^{G}: 1,459
- Philippines: 1,403
- Norway: 1,400
- Spain: 1,390
- Netherlands: 1,380
- Switzerland: 1,377
- Germany: 1,373
- Italy: 1,370
- Sweden: 1,367

Languages
- Scottish English • Scottish Gaelic • Scots

Religion
- Historically or Traditionally Protestant Christianity, mainly Presbyterianism, also Episcopalism, with smaller Catholic minority and others. Increaslingly irreligious. For further information see Religion in Scotland
- ^{A} These figures are estimates based on official census data of populations and official surveys of identity.^{B} Scottish Americans and Scotch-Irish Americans.^{C} Scottish Canadians.^{D} Scottish-born people in England only^{E} Ulster-Scots^{F} missing^{G} Number of people born in Scotland. missing^{H}Scottish Australians

The Scottish diaspora consists of Scottish people who emigrated from Scotland and their descendants. The diaspora is concentrated in countries such as the United States, Canada, Australia, England, New Zealand, Ireland (especially Ulster), and to a lesser extent Argentina, Chile, and Brazil. The Scottish diaspora has been estimated by the Scottish Government to be between 28 and 40 million people worldwide. Other estimates have ranged as high as 80 million.

According to Marjory Harper (2003) of the University of Aberdeen, Scottish emigrants and their descendants have maintained connections to Scotland though formal and informal means including "church, school and Scottish society" and "place names, correspondence, family and community networks, and chain migration". Rogers Brubaker (2005) wrote that immigrants from Scotland have regarded the ancestral homeland as "an authoritative source of value, identity and loyalty". According to Lauren Brancaz (2016) of the Centre for Breton and Celtic Research: "Scottish culture has not been contained within the borders of Scotland. It has lived on in the minds of migrants who have remained attached to it".

== Americas ==
=== Argentina ===
A Scottish Argentine population has existed at least since 1825. There are an estimated 200,000 Argentines of Scottish ancestry, the most of any country outside the English-speaking world. Scottish Argentines have been incorrectly referred to as English.

=== Canada ===
Scottish people have a long history in Canada, dating back several centuries. Many towns, rivers and mountains have been named in honour of Scottish explorers and traders such as Mackenzie Bay and the major city of Calgary, Alberta, is named after a Scottish beach. Most notably, the Atlantic province of Nova Scotia is Latin for New Scotland. Once Scots formed the vanguard of the movement of Europeans across the continent. In more modern times, emigrants from Scotland have played a leading role in the social, political and economic history of Canada, being prominent in banking, labour unions, and politics.

The first documented Scottish settlement in the Americas was of Nova Scotia (New Scotland) in 1629. On 29 September 1621, the charter for the foundation of a colony was granted by James VI of Scotland to Sir William Alexander. Between 1622 and 1628, Sir William launched four attempts to send colonists to Nova Scotia; all failed for various reasons. A successful occupation of Nova Scotia was finally achieved in 1629. The colony's charter, in law, made Nova Scotia (defined as all land between Newfoundland and New England) a part of mainland Scotland. The Scots have influenced the cultural mix of Nova Scotia for centuries and constitute the largest ethnic group in the province, at 29.3% of its population. Many Scottish immigrants were monoglot Scottish Gaelic speakers from the Gàidhealtachd (Scottish Highlands). Canadian Gaelic was spoken as the first language in much of "Anglophone" Canada, such as Nova Scotia, Prince Edward Island, and Glengarry County in Ontario. Gaelic was the third most commonly spoken language in Canada.

As the third-largest ethnic group in Canada and amongst the first Europeans to settle in the country, Scottish people have made a large impact on Canadian culture since colonial times. According to the 2011 Census of Canada, the number of Canadians claiming full or partial Scottish descent is 4,714,970, or 15.10% of the nation's total population.

=== Chile ===
A large proportion of Scottish Chileans are sheep farmers in the Magallanes region of the far south of the country, and the city of Punta Arenas has a large Scottish foundation dating back to the 18th century. A famous Scot, Thomas, Lord Cochrane (later 10th Earl of Dundonald) formed the Chilean Navy to help liberate Chile from Spain in the independence period. Chile developed a strong diplomatic relationship with Great Britain and invited more British settlers to the country in the 19th century. In 1820 the Scottish sailor Andrew MacFarlane, former lieutenant of the Chilean Navy, possibly discovered the continental Antarctic territory landing on the Antarctic Peninsula, he continued his life in Valparaíso, and his ship was known as the Dragon of Valparaíso.

The Chilean government land deals invited settlement from Scotland and Wales in its southern provinces in the 1840s and 1850s. The number of Scottish Chileans is still higher in Patagonia and Magallanes regions. The Mackay School, in Viña del Mar is an example of a school set up by Scottish Chileans. The Scottish and other British Chileans are primarily found in higher education as well in economic management and the country's cultural life.

=== Mexico ===
Scottish people came to Mexico as a component of larger British ventures that facilitated the nation's economic growth following its independence.

=== United States ===
Scottish ancestry in the United States, 1700–2013
Year	Ethnic group	Population	% of total population	Ref.
1700 est.	Scottish	7,526	3.0%	
1755 est.	Scottish & Scots-Irish		4.0% & 7.0% (11.0%)	
1775 est.	Scottish & Scots-Irish		6.6% & 7.8% (14.4%)	
1790 est.	Scottish & Scots-Irish		6.6% & 4.8% (11.4%)	
1980	Scottish	10,048,816	4.44%	
1990	Scottish & Scots-Irish	5,393,581 & 5,617,773	2.2% & 2.3% (4.5%)	
2000	Scottish & Scots-Irish	4,890,581 & 4,319,232	1.7% & 1.5% (3.2%)	
2010 (ACS)	Scottish & Scots-Irish	5,460,679 & 3,257,161	1.9% & 3.1% (5%)	
2013 (ACS)	Scottish & Scots-Irish	5,310,285 & 2,976,878	1.7% & 1% (2.7%)	

The table shows the ethnic Scottish population in the United States from 1700 to 2013. In 1700, the total population of the American colonies was 250,888 of whom 223,071 (89%) were white and 3.0% were ethnically Scottish. In the 2000 census, 4.8 million Americans self-reported Scottish ancestry, 1.7% of the total US population. Another 4.3 million self-reported Scots-Irish ancestry, for a total of 9.2 million Americans self-reporting some kind of Scottish descent.

The 2008 US Census 2008 American Community Survey figures showed approximately 5.8 million Americans self-identified as being of Scottish ancestry, and another 3.5 million Scots-Irish, for 9.3 million total. In the 2013 American Community Survey, 5.3 ;million identified as Scottish and another nearly 3 million as of Scots-Irish descent, for about 8.3 million total.

Self-reported numbers are regarded by demographers as massive under-counts, because Scottish ancestry is known to be disproportionately under-reported among the majority of mixed ancestry, and because areas where people reported "American" ancestry were the places where, historically, Scottish and Scots-Irish Protestants settled in North America (that is: along the North American coast, Appalachia, and the Southeastern United States). The number of actual Americans of Scottish descent today is estimated to be 20 to 25 million (up to 8.3% of the total US population), and Scots-Irish, 27 to 30 million (up to 10% of the total US population), the subgroups overlapping and not always distinguishable because of their shared ancestral surnames.

Large-scale emigration from Scotland to America began in the 1700s after the Battle of Culloden, when the Clan structures were broken up. Anti-Catholic persecution and the Highland Clearances also obliged many Scottish Gaels to emigrate. The Scots went in search of a better life and settled in the thirteen colonies, mainly around South Carolina and Virginia.

The majority of Scots-Irish originally came from Lowland Scotland and the Scottish Borders before migrating to the province of Ulster in Ireland mostly in the 17th century and from there, beginning about five generations later, to North America in large numbers during the 18th century.

Later Scottish Americans descended from 19th-century Scottish immigrants tend to be concentrated in the West, while others in New England are the descendants of immigrants from the Maritime Provinces of Canada, especially in the 1920s.

Americans who identify themselves as of Scottish descent outnumber the population of Scotland, where 4,459,071 or 88.09% of people identified as ethnic Scottish in the 2000 Census. There are many US-based Scottish clan societies and other heritage organizations (such as the Saint Andrews societies, Caledonian societies, An Comunn Gàidhealach America, Slighe nan Gàidheal), through which "Scottish migrants have remained attached to their homeland".

== Asia-Pacific ==
=== Australia ===
Scottish ancestry in Australia, 1986–2021 (Census)
Year	Population	Percent of pop.	Ref
1986	740,522	4.7%	
2001	540,046	2.9%	
2006	1,501,200	7.6%	
2011	1,792,622	8.3%	
2016	2,023,468	8.6%	
2021	2,176,777	8.6%	

A steady rate of Scottish immigration continued into the 20th century, with substantial numbers of Scots continued to arrive after 1945. From 1900 until the 1950s, Scots favoured New South Wales, as well as Western Australia and Southern Australia. A strong cultural Scottish presence is evident in the Highland games, dance, Tartan day celebrations, Clan and Gaelic speaking societies found throughout modern Australia.

According to the 2021 Australian census 118,496 Australian residents were born in Scotland, while 2,176,777 claimed Scottish ancestry, either alone or in combination with another ancestry. This is the fourth most commonly nominated ancestry and represents 8.6% of the total population of Australia.

=== New Zealand ===
The settlement of English in the North Island and northern South Island and Scottish in the Deep South is reflected in the dominance of Anglicanism and Presbyterianism in the respective regions.

Scottish migration to New Zealand dates back to the earliest period of European colonisation, with a large proportion of Pākehā New Zealanders being of Scottish descent. However, identification as "British" or "European" New Zealanders can sometimes obscure their origin. Many Scottish New Zealanders also have Māori or other non-European ancestry.

The majority of Scottish immigrants settled in the South Island. All over New Zealand, the Scots developed different means to bridge the old homeland and the new. Many Caledonian societies were formed, well over 100 by the early twentieth century, who helped maintain Scottish culture and traditions. From the 1860s, these societies organised annual Caledonian Games throughout New Zealand. The games were sports meets that brought together Scottish settlers and the wider New Zealand public. In so doing, the games gave Scots a path to cultural integration as Scottish New Zealanders.

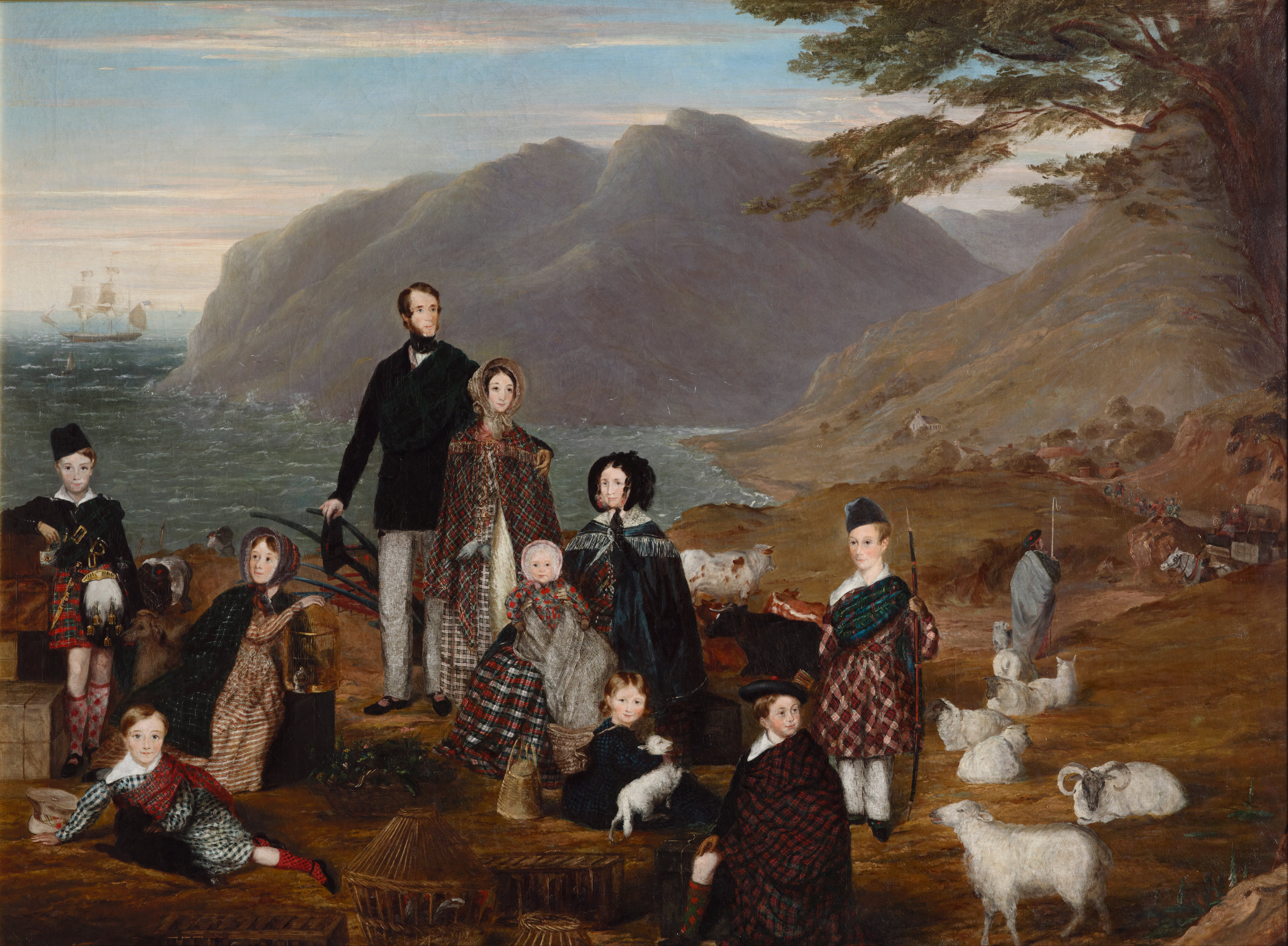
Scottish Highland family migrating to New Zealand

The Lay Association of the Free Church of Scotland founded Dunedin at the head of Otago Harbour in 1848 as the principal town of its Scottish settlement. The name comes from Dùn Èideann, the Scottish Gaelic name for Edinburgh, the Scottish capital. Charles Kettle, the city's surveyor, instructed to emulate the characteristics of Edinburgh, produced a striking, "Romantic" design. The result was both grand and quirky streets as the builders struggled and sometimes failed to construct his bold vision across the challenging landscape. Captain William Cargill, a veteran of the war against Napoleon, was the secular leader. The Reverend Thomas Burns, a nephew of the poet Robert Burns, was the spiritual guide.

== Europe ==
=== Denmark ===
From 1570 to 1630, some 6,000 Scots served as mercenary soldiers of Denmark.

=== England ===
As England is Scotland's only land neighbour, there has been significant Scottish migration to England since the Union of the Crowns in 1603. London now has two Church of Scotland congregations, the ScotsCare charity (formerly the Royal Scottish Corporation), and Scottish social clubs.

Described by historian Dan Jackson as having a "symbiotic" relationship with Scotland, North East England's Scottish diaspora has been well-established since at least the 1500s. Newcastle upon Tyne alone had hundreds of Scottish inhabitants in the 16th century, including John Knox (1514-1572), who would later lead the Scottish Reformation. Many of Newcastle's miners recorded in 1637 were Scottish and, in 1740 over 50% of the city's keelmen were born in Fife, Stirlingshire or Lothian. By November 1914, there was a Tyneside Scottish Brigade of the British Army.

During the late 18th and early 19th centuries, Scots in England became prominent figures in fields such as finance, engineering and medicine. John Macadam, John Rennie and Thomas Telford designed many English infrastructure projects including bridges, roads, canals and railways. Between 1860-1882, over 1,115 Scots-born medical graduates had spent some or all of their careers in England; Scottish doctors were found in almost every English county, with the greatest numbers found in London, Yorkshire and Lancashire. The Industrial Revolution had been a pull for Scottish migrants to England. By 1851, there were 131,000 Scots residing in England and Wales. Scots entrepreneurs James McConnel, John Kennedy, as well as Adam and George Murray were influential to the growth of the Manchester cotton industry, with many Scots themselves employed in the city's mills. The glass industry in the Lancashire town St Helens attracted many Scots workers; as of 1851, around 7% of the town's glass workers were Scottish (as was 3% of the total population).

Corby in Northamptonshire is known for its large Scottish diaspora community, with the town sometimes being nicknamed "Little Scotland". A major inrush from Scotland to the town occurred in the 1930s, when many flocked to Stewarts & Lloyds steelworks. By 1961, over a third of the town's population was Scottish-born. In 2001, Corby had the highest concentration of Scottish-born people in the UK outside of Scotland.

Following the decline of coal mining in Scotland in the 1950s and 1960s, many Scottish miners sought work in the South Yorkshire Coalfield, including at Maltby and Kellingley. Mining communities in Nottinghamshire also saw an influx of Scottish mining families in the 20th century.

=== France ===
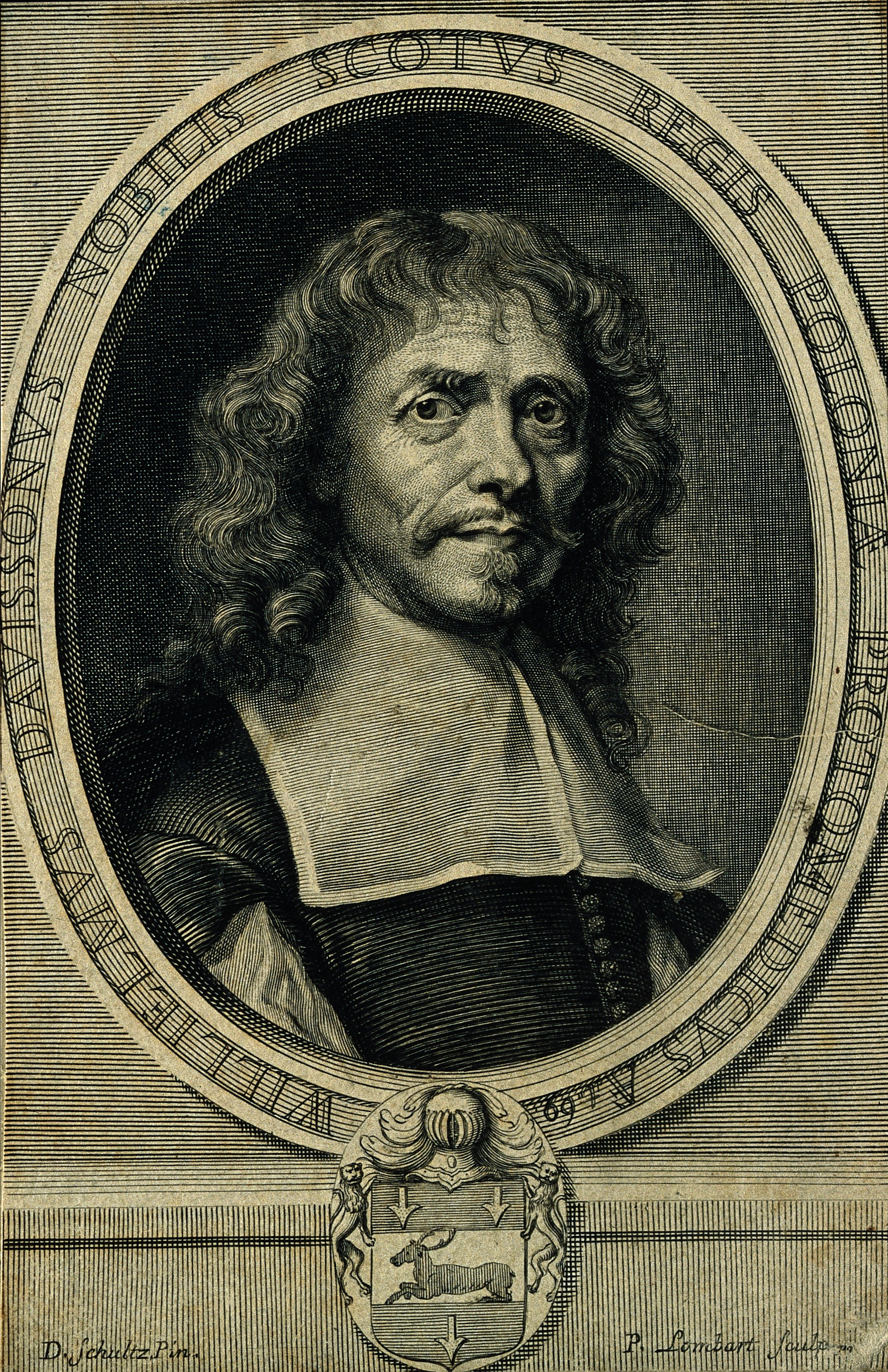
William Davidson, court doctor of Kings of France and Poland

Between 1570 and 1630, some 11,000 Scots served as mercenary soldiers of France.

William Davidson (c. 1593–c. 1669) was an authority on medicine, pharmacy and chemistry in France, court doctor of the French king, and the first native of the British Isles to become a professor of chemistry in France.

=== Ireland ===
The Ulster-Scots, commonly known as Scots-Irish outside of Ireland, are an ethnic group in Ireland, found mostly in Ulster, the northern province in Ireland, and to a lesser extent in the rest of Ireland. Their ancestors were mostly Protestant Lowland Scottish migrants, the largest numbers coming from Galloway, Lanarkshire, Stirlingshire, and Ayrshire, although some came from the Scottish Borders region, and others from further north in the Scottish Lowlands (Perthshire and the North East) and also to a lesser extent from the Highlands.

These Scots migrated to Ireland in large numbers both as a result of the government-sanctioned Plantation of Ulster and the previous and contemporary settlement of Scots in County Antrim and County Down by James Hamilton, Hugh Montgomery, and Lord Randal MacDonnell; the former a planned process of colonisation beginning in 1610 which took place under the auspices of King James VI and I on land confiscated from members of the Gaelic nobility of Ireland who fled Ulster, and the latter a private scheme beginning in 1606, but also authorised by King James. These arrivals joined other Scots already in the area from centuries of smaller-scale immigration by Scottish gallowglass mercenaries and their families.

Ulster-Scots emigrated onwards from Ireland in significant numbers to what is now the United States and to all corners of the then-worldwide British Empire; Canada, Australia, New Zealand, South Africa, the West Indies, British India, and to a lesser extent Argentina and Chile. Scotch-Irish is a traditional term for Ulster-Scots in North America.

=== Lithuania ===
The Scots, forming a significant diaspora in Poland (see Poland section below), rarely settled in the Lithuanian part of the Polish–Lithuanian Commonwealth; however, they conducted trade there, and there were Scottish communities in Kėdainiai and Słuck. Out of gratitude for the opportunity to settle in Kėdainiai, the Scottish burghers funded scholarships for students from Lithuania at the University of Edinburgh. Many of them intermixed with ethnic Lithuanians, and as a result, there are some Lithuanians with partial Scottish ancestry today.

=== Low Countries ===
A Scottish diaspora has been established in the Low Countries (Belgium, Luxembourg and the Netherlands) since at least the 16th century. There was a Scots Brigade of the Dutch States Army from 1586 until 1782. A Scots Kirk in the Dutch city of Rotterdam was established in 1640 by merchants and religious exiles. Dutch and Scottish Calvinism were similar in outlook, and the Dutch state funded the Scottish Kirk. As of the 1680s, there were over 1000 Scottish-born residents in Rotterdam.

=== Poland ===
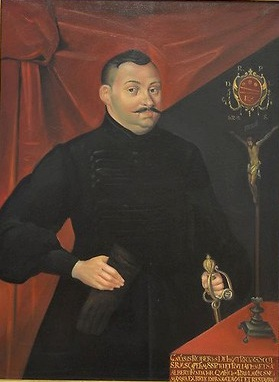
Robert Gilbert Porteous, wealthiest merchant of 17th-century Krosno

Since the mid-16th century, historical records document the presence of Scots trading, serving as mercenary soldiers, and settling in Poland. The vast majority were traders, from wealthy merchants to the thousands of pedlars who ensured that the term szot became synonymous in the Polish language with "tinker". A "Scotch Pedlar's Pack in Poland" became a proverbial expression. It usually consisted of cloths, woollen goods and linen kerchiefs (head coverings). Itinerants also sold tin utensils and ironware such as scissors and knives. By 1562 the community was sizeable enough that the Scots, along with the Italians, were recognized by the Sejm as traders whose activities were harming Polish cities; in 1566, they were banned from roaming and peddling their wares.

However, from the 1570s onward, it was recognized that such bans were ineffectual. A heavy tax was placed upon them instead. Thomas Chamberlayne, an English eyewitness, described them disapprovingly in a 1610 letter to Robert Cecil, Earl of Salisbury, stating that "[t]hese Scotts for the most parte are height landers [i.e. highlanders] men of noe credit, a Company of pedeling knaves..." Linked to some degree of persecution and their role in the Danzig uprising, protection (and by extension, a form of control) was offered by King Stephen Báthory in the Royal Grant of 1576, assigning Scottish immigrants to a district in Kraków. By the first half of the 17th century, the affairs of the Scottish community were regulated by twelve Brotherhoods with seats across various Polish cities; this included a tribunal that met to adjudicate disputes in the Royal city of Toruń. In 1603, the office of the Scottish General (Generał Szkocki) was created to collect taxes and organize the judiciary over all Scots in Poland, with Captain Abraham Young appointed by King Sigismund III Vasa as the first superior.

Scottish mercenary soldiers first served in large numbers in the late 1570s. Many were former traders. According to Spytko Wawrzyniec Jordan, one of King Stephen Báthory's captains, they were former pedlars who, "having abandoned or sold their booths ... buckle on their sword and shoulder their musket; they are infantry of unusual quality, although they look shabby to us ... 2000 Scots are better than 6000 of our own infantry." It is possible that the shift from peddling to military occupations was connected to the implementation of heavy taxation on pedlars in the 1570s. Scottish mercenary soldiers were recruited specifically by King Stephen Báthory following his experience with them in forces raised by Danzig against him in 1577. Báthory commented favourably upon the Scots and expressed a wish for them to be recruited in campaigns that he was planning against Muscovy. A steady stream of Scots soldiers served the Polish–Lithuanian Commonwealth from this point forward.

Records from 1592 mention Scots settlers granted citizenship of Kraków, and give their employment as trader or merchant. Fees for citizenship ranged from 12 Polish florins to a musket and gunpowder, or an undertaking to marry within a year and a day of acquiring a holding.

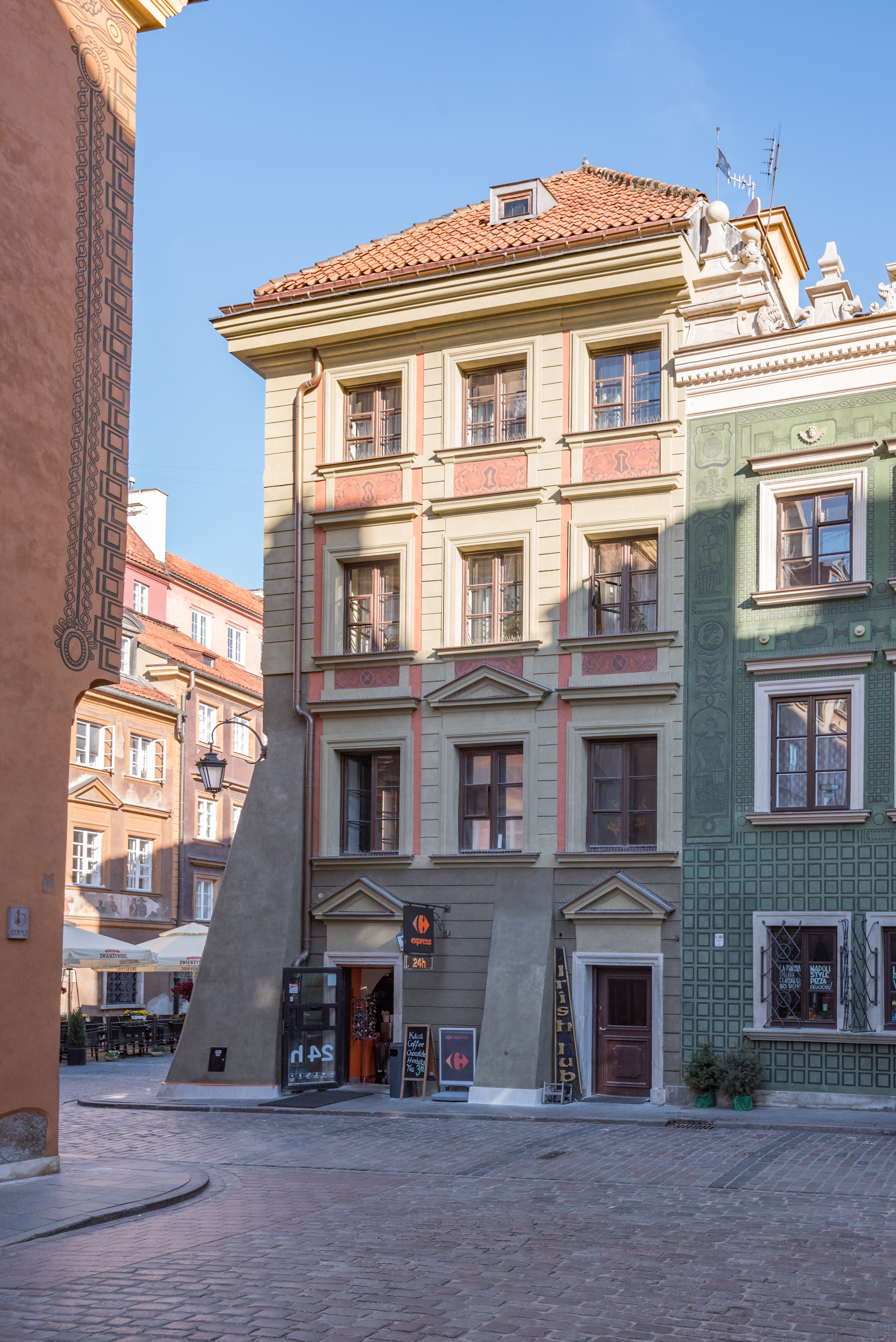
Home of Alexander Chalmers, mayor of Warsaw

By the 17th century, an estimated 30,000 to 40,000 Scots lived in the Polish–Lithuanian Commonwealth. Many came from Dundee and Aberdeen. The largest Scottish communities could be found in Gdańsk, Kraków, Lublin, Lwów, Poznań, Warsaw and Zamość, and sizeable numbers of Scots also lived in Brzeziny, Bydgoszcz, Człopa, Krosno, Łobżenica, Raciąż, Sieradz, Sierpc, Tarnów, Tuchola, Wałcz, Warta and Zakroczym. Small communities also existed in Biały Bór, Borek Wielkopolski, Brody, Chojnice, Czarne, Człuchów, Gniew, Gostyń, Iłża, Jedlińsk, Koronowo, Opole Lubelskie, Puck, Skoki, Starogard, Szamotuły, Szydłowiec, Świecie and Węgrów. Settlers from Aberdeenshire were mainly Episcopalians or Catholics, but there were also large numbers of Calvinists. As well as Scottish traders, there were also many Scottish soldiers in Poland. In 1656, a number of Scottish highlanders travelled to Poland, serving under the King of Sweden in his war against it.

The Scots integrated well and many acquired great wealth. They contributed to many charitable institutions in the host country, but did not forget their homeland; for example, in 1701 when collections were made for the restoration fund of the Marischal College, Aberdeen, Scottish settlers in Poland gave generously.

Many royal grants and privileges were granted to Scottish merchants until the 18th century, at which time the settlers began to assimilate more and more into the native population. Charles Edward Stuart ("Bonnie Prince Charlie") was half Polish, since he was the son of James Francis Edward Stuart, the "Old Pretender", and Maria Clementina Sobieska, granddaughter of John III Sobieski, king of Poland. There were instances of Scottish immigrants being elected mayors of Polish cities, i.e. Michael Wolson in Wałcz, James Gordon in Węgrów and Alexander Chalmers in Warsaw.

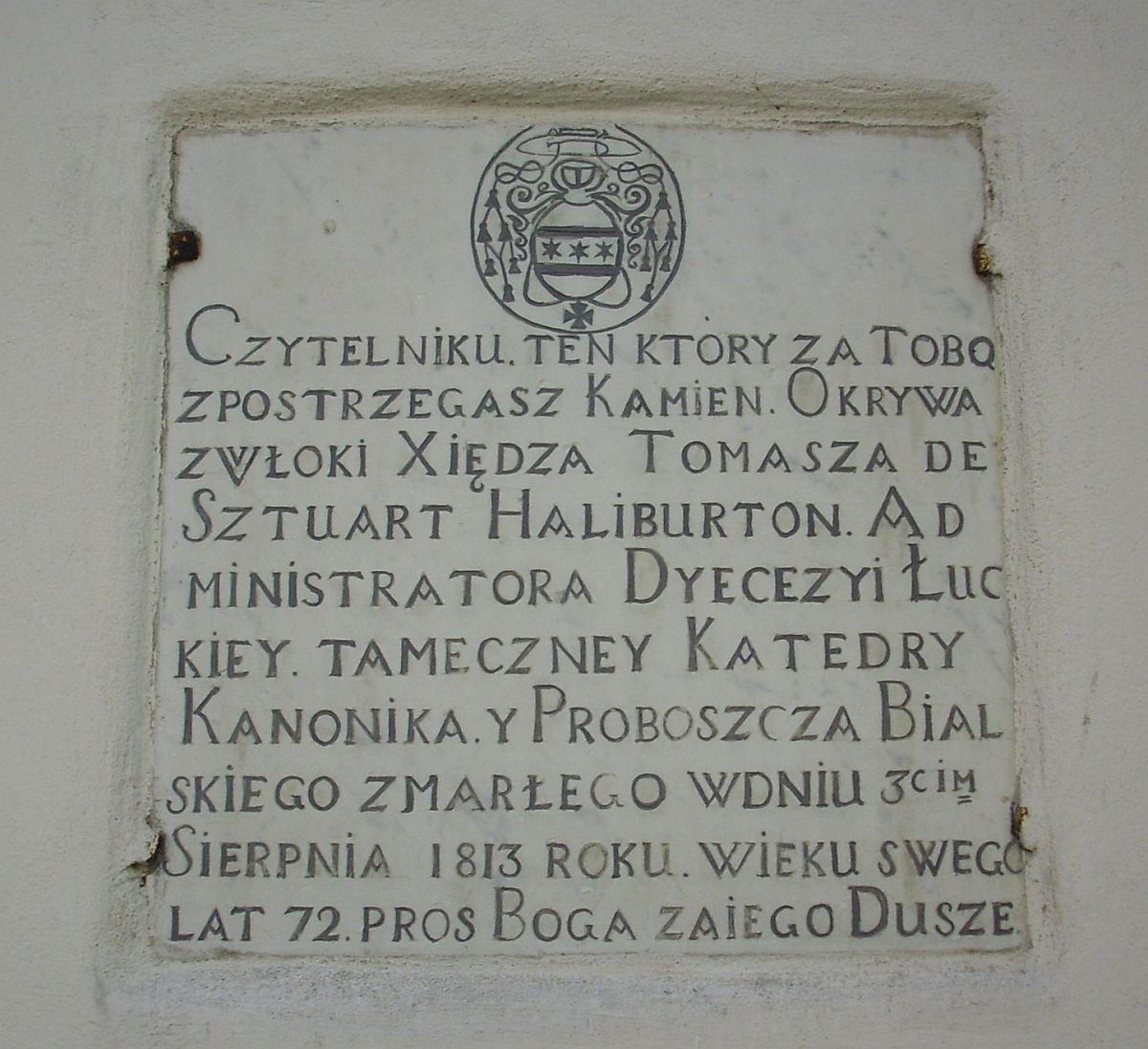
Epitaph of Scottish parish priest Thomas de Stuart Haliburton at the Saint Anne church in Biała Podlaska

There are places named after Scottish immigrants in Poland, i.e. Stare Szkoty ("Old Scots"), a former suburb of Gdańsk, today a neighborhood within the city limits, inhabited by Scots since the 15th and 16th centuries, and the village of Szkocja ("Scotland"), founded in 1823. The Mier Barracks, Mier Halls and Mirów neighbourhood in Warsaw are named after Wilhelm Mier, Polish major general of Scottish origin.

In 1879, Scottish specialists were brought to Warsaw to run a newly established hornware factory of Polish industrialist Ludwik Józef Krasiński.

In the 2011 Polish census, 632 people declared Scottish nationality.

Notable people include:

- James Murray (c. 1500s – c. 1600s), naval captain and shipbuilder
- Robert Abercromby (1536–1613), Jesuit missionary, lecturer at the Collegium Hosianum in Braniewo
- William Bruce (c. 1560–after 1613), professor and lecturer at the Zamoyski Academy in Zamość, later diplomat of King James VI of Scotland.
- William Davidson (c. 1593–c. 1669), court doctor of King John II Casimir Vasa of Poland
- Robert Gilbert Porteous (c. 1600–1661), wealthiest merchant of 17th-century Krosno
- Patrick Gordon (1635–1699), student of the Collegium Hosianum, officer in the Polish Army
- Alexander Chalmers (1645–1703), merchant, jurist, city mayor in Warsaw
- Wilhelm Mier (c. 1680–1758), major general in the Polish army

=== Russia ===
The first identifiable Scots reached Russia in small numbers during the 17th century, mainly as soldiers or technical experts. Their presence expanded greatly in the seventeenth century, when the Tsarist government recruited large numbers of foreign officers, engineers and doctors.Scots became a notable element within military group, particularly under Peter the Great. Unlike in Poland–Lithuania, however, Scots in Russia generally faced restrictions on assimilation due to religious and social barriers, and mostly remained a distinct foreign community.

=== Sweden ===
From 1570 to 1630, some 30,000 Scots served as mercenary soldiers of Sweden.

== See also ==
- English-speaking world
- European diaspora
- Celtic diaspora (disambiguation)
- Scottish Business Network

== Bibliography ==
- Feduszka, Jacek (2009). "Szkoci i Anglicy w Zamościu w XVI-XVIII wieku". Czasy Nowożytne (in Polish). Vol. 22. Zarząd Główny Polskiego Towarzystwa Historycznego. ISSN 1428-8982.
- Wijaczka, Jacek (2010). "Szkoci". In Kopczyński, Michał; Tygielski, Wojciech (eds.). Pod wspólnym niebem. Narody dawnej Rzeczypospolitej (in Polish). Warszawa: Muzeum Historii Polski, Bellona. ISBN 978-83-11-11724-2.
