= In Defence of Our Earth =

Studio album by Oi Polloi
- Released: 1990
- Recorded: January 1990
- Venue: Edinburgh, Scotland
- Studio: Pier House Studios
- Genre: Anarcho-punk, Scottish hardcore
- Label: Words of Warning

Oi Polloi chronology
Unite and Win (1987)	In Defence of Our Earth (1990)	Omnicide.... (1991)

In Defence Of Our Earth is an anarcho-punk album, by the band Oi Polloi. It was released in 1990 on Words Of Warning Records.

== Track listing ==
1. Thin Green Line
2. 23 Hours
3. When Two Men Kiss
4. Whale Song
5. What Have We Done?
6. Victim of a Chemical Spillage
7. Anarcho-Pie
8. Clachan Chalanais
9. Free The Henge
10. Nazi Scum
11. World Park Antarctica
