= Ceàrr =

Studio album by Mill a h-Uile Rud
- Released: 2004
- Genre: Gaelic Punk
- Label: Clàran Droch-Shùil

Mill a h-Uile Rud chronology
Ceàrr	Ceòl Gàidhlig mar Sgian nad Amhaich

Ceàrr was the first album by the Celtic rock band Mill a h-Uile Rud. Ceàrr was the first CD of all-new Gaelic songs ever released and was also the first CD produced with exclusively Gaelic liner notes. Runrig's album Play Gaelic was the first album of all-Gaelic music in a modern, rock and roll style, but along with new compositions, featured rock re-workings of several traditional songs, and Oi Polloi's EP, Carson?, was the first vinyl record of all-new rock compositions in Gaelic. Ceàrr is also notable for its sexual themes and strong obscenity; a rarity in the ultra-conservative modern Gaelic music scene. The name of the album means wrong in Gaelic, and the band chose this name as a statement of their belief that you should use Gaelic, even if you don't feel entirely confident in the language.

== Track listing ==
1. Dè mu a Dheidhinn, 2:53
2. Air An Achadh Bhàn, 2:38
3. Feumaidh Sinn Ruith, 2:41
4. Spàrr nad Thòn E, 2:49
5. Fèis Feise, 2:42
6. Mill a h-Uile Rud, 2:20
7. El Castillito, 2:10
