= Ar Cànan, Ar Ceòl, Ar-a-mach =

Ar Ceòl Ar Cànan Ar-A-Mach

Studio album by Oi Polloi
- Released: May 2006
- Recorded: February 2006
- Genre: Scottish Gaelic punk Anarcho-punk
- Label: Self-Released (CD); Musi Canard (LP)

Oi Polloi chronology
Outraged by the System (2002)	Ar Ceòl Ar Cànan Ar-A-Mach (2006)

Ar Cànan, Ar Ceòl, Ar-A-Mach ("Our Language, Our Music, Rebellion") is an anarcho-punk album, by the band Oi Polloi. It was released in 2006 by the band on CD, and on vinyl in 2007. This was the first full-length rock LP sung entirely in Gaelic since Runrig released their Play Gaelic LP in 1979.

== Track listing ==
1. "Ar Ceòl 's Ar Cànan"
2. "Brosnachadh Catha"
3. "Ramalair Rùisgte"
4. "Ceud Mìle Fàilte"
5. "Là na Sabaid"
6. "Daibhidh Sneddon"
7. "Sgrùdadh 2323"
8. "Bas dhan t-Siostam"
9. "Union Jack? Thall 's Cac!"
10. "Fear a' Bhàta"
11. "Càit a Bheil an Armachd Lèir-Sgrios?"
12. "9-11"
13. "Coin-Chaorach is Madaidhean-Allaidh"
14. "SS Politician"
