= Omnicide (disambiguation) =

Omnicide refers to the destruction of all life or all human life.

Omnicide can also refer to:

- Omnicide (album), an album by Scottish punk band Oi Polloi
- Omnicide – Creation Unleashed, an album by German melodic death metal band Neaera
