= William Davison (physician) =

Franco-Scottish chemist and physician

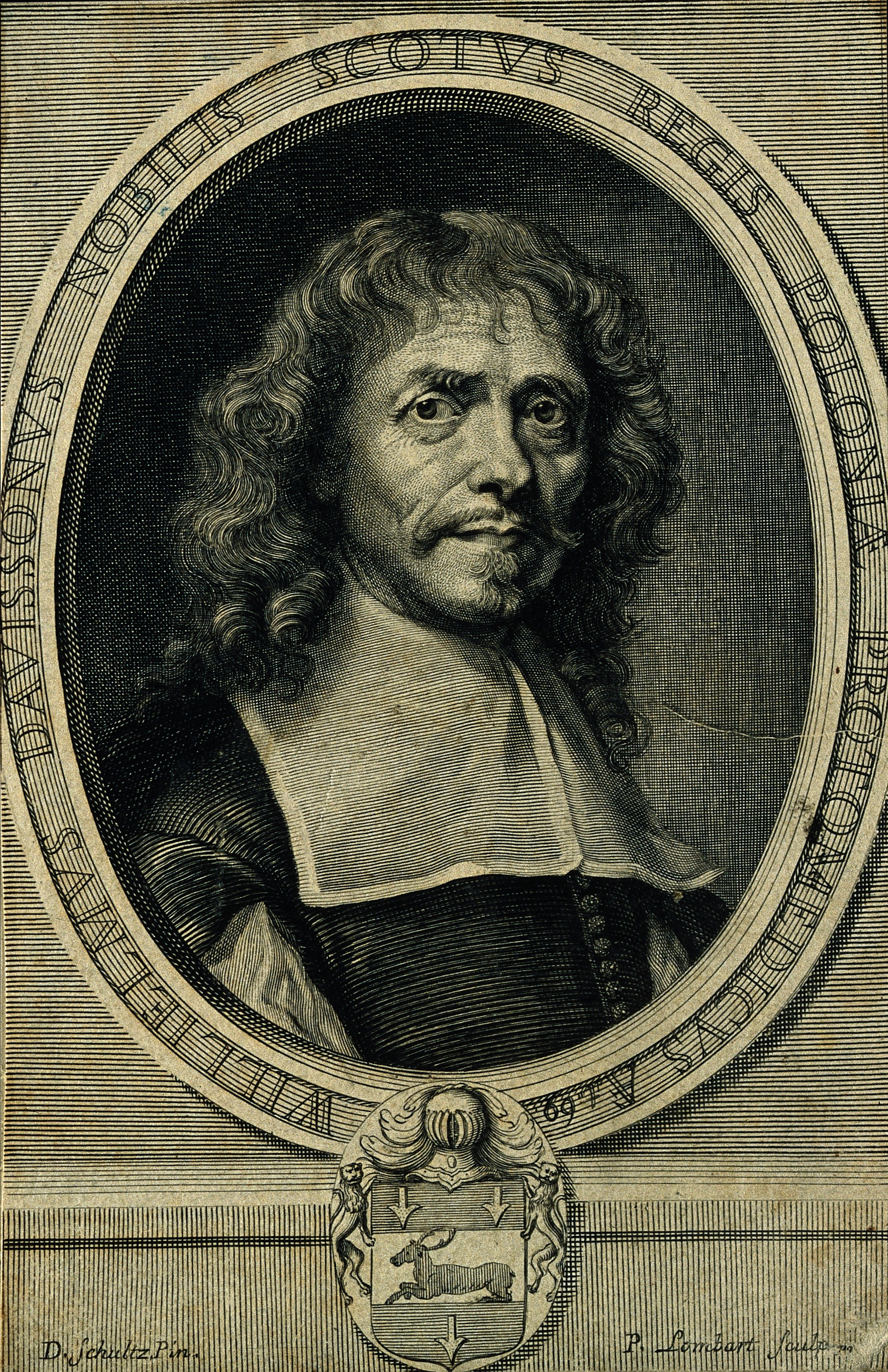
- Occupations: Chemist and physician

William Davison, or Davidson, (fl. 1635–1660) was a Franco-Scottish chemist and physician.

== Biography ==
Davison was of Scottish descent, but at an early period settled in Paris, and, through the patronage of Henrietta Maria, wife of Charles I, was named physician to the king of France.

Lord Scudamore, English ambassador in Paris, writing to Secretary Windebank, promises to ‘signify to Dr. Davison his majesty's [Charles I] gracious favour. He has been rightly informed concerning the worth of this man, and the benefit his Majesty's subjects receive by him’ (Cal. State Papers, Charles I, Dom. Ser. 1635–6, p. 321).

His name also occurs occasionally in subsequent volumes of the ‘Calendars of State Papers,’ in connection with those of persons of eminence who had consulted him. On the title-page of his ‘Prodromus,’ published at the Hague in 1660, he is styled ‘nobilis Scotus,’ formerly councilor and physician to the king of France, and keeper of the Royal Botanic Garden of Paris, and now senior surgeon to the king of Poland. The date of his appointment to be superintendent of the botanic gardens was 1648, and he resigned this appointment to go to Poland in 1650. Evelyn mentions in his ‘Diary’ having gone during his visit to Paris to ‘hear Dr. D'Avisson's lecture in ye physical garden and see his laboratorie, he being prefect of y't excellent garden and Professor Botannicus.’

He is mentioned by La Marolles, along with several other savants, as not less distinguished by their knowledge and skill than by their probity (Mémoires, Amsterdam, ed. 1755, iii. 354). Davison was more distinguished as a chemist than a botanist, and was an enthusiastic partisan of the ideas of Paracelsus.

His principal work is his Philosophia Pyrotechnica seu Cursus Chymiatricus nobilissima illa et exoptatissima Medicinæ parte Pyrotechnica instructus, multis iisque haud vulgaribus observationibus adornatus. Of this work, Pars tertia-quarta’ was published in 1633 and also in 1640 (Brit. Mus. Cat.), and Pars primasecunda in 1635 and 1642 (Cat., Advocates' Library, Edinburgh). In the copy in the British Museum of the complete edition of the Philosophia Pyrotechnica, with the date 1641, there is a portrait of Davison at the age of sixty-nine, but it bears evidence of having been inserted after the volume was bound, and it is improbable that Davison was so old as sixty-nine in 1641. Another edition of the Philosophia Pyrotechnica was published in 1657 (Lengley du Fresnoy, Histoire de la Philosophie Hermétique, iii. 3).

There is in the British Museum a French translation of the work by Jean Hellot, titled Eléments de la philosophie de l'art du feu, ou chemie, Paris, 1657. Another translation, according to Lenglet du Fresnoy by Davison himself, was published at Paris in 1675 under the title, Eléments de la philosophie de l'art du feu ou cours de chemie. In 1651, a book appeared in Paris titled Observations sur l'antimoine et sur la nécessité inevitable de la connoissance et usage de la chemie. Extraits de la Philosophie de l'art du feu ou chemique, du Sieur Davissone. This book, of which there is a copy in the British Museum, is probably a translation of the De Natura Antimonii mentioned by Lenglet du Fresnoy as published in Paris in 1641.

The other works of Davison in the library of the British Museum are: Oblatio Salis, sive Gallia Lege Salis condita, 1641; Commentariorum in sublimis philosophi et incomparabilis viri Petri Severini Dani ideam medicinæ philosophicæ prope diem proditurorum Prodromus, the Hague, 1660 (another edition was published at the Hague and at Rotterdam in 1668); and Theophrasti veridici Scoti Doctoris Medici Plicomastix seu plicæ e numero morborum apospasma, Danzig, 1668. This work was printed in Aberdeen. The Collectanea Chimica Medico-Philosophica Polonica Will. Davisonii appeared in Antwerp in 1698.
