= Scottish Business Network =

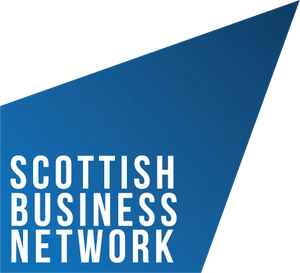
- Abbreviation: SBN
- Formation: 2016; 10 years ago
- Founder: Russell Dalgleish; Christine Esson
- Type: Nonprofit association
- Purpose: Uniting the Scottish diaspora for the benefit of Scotland
- Location: Linlithgow, West Lothian, Scotland
- Region served: Scotland
- Volunteers: 48 ambassadors (2023)
- Website: sbn.scot

Scottish Business Network (SBN) is a Scottish non-profit organisation based in Edinburgh.

SBN is led by Chair Russell Dalgleish and aims to connect the Scottish diaspora and support international business connectivity from Scotland. It organises Scottish International Week, a series of international events that promote trade, exports, and internationalisation opportunities for Scottish companies by facilitating connections with the diaspora.

== History ==
Scottish Business Network (SBN) was founded in 2016 by Russell Dalgleish and former Scottish Enterprise executive Christine Esson. The idea originated in 2008, when Dalgleish attended an art event in Trafalgar Square organised by Antony Gormley. While attending the event, Dalgleish reflected on his Scottish identity and his lack of connection to Scotland while living in London.

Initially, SBN hosted monthly events in London featuring Scottish companies such as Appointed to engage senior members of the Scottish diaspora and support commercial networking. Later, SBN established "soft landing" support centres in London and Dubai, offering facilities and local network access to help Scottish companies expand. It also held events in Hong Kong, Singapore, and Dubai. The organisation introduced a digital platform developed by Glasgow-based VeryConnect and a consultancy service to help Scottish businesses expand to new regions.

In 2017, SBN received a small grant from the Scottish Government and Scottish Enterprise to support sustainable economic growth in Scotland.

In February 2021, SBN established an office in the United States to support Scottish companies operating in North America and to facilitate trade between the regions. Previously, in 2020, it had appointed Ian Houston as ambassador in Washington, D.C., Tom Thomas in India, and Fraser Grier in New York City.

Since its founding in 2016, the network has expanded to include 48 voluntary ambassadors across 22 countries and focuses on facilitating global business connections for the Scottish diaspora.
