= Unite and Win =

Unite and Win!

Studio album by Oi Polloi
- Released: 1987
- Recorded: March 1987/June 1987
- Venue: Edinburgh, Scotland
- Studio: Pier House Studios
- Genre: Oi!, Anarcho-punk, hardcore punk
- Label: Oi! Records
- Producer: Oi Polloi and Peter Haigh

Oi Polloi chronology
Mad As Fuck L.P. (1987)	Unite and Win! (1987)	In Defence of Our Earth (1990)

Unite and Win! is an oi!/anarcho-punk album by the band Oi Polloi. It was originally released in 1987 on Oi! Records, and re-released in 2001 on Step 1 Records with eight extra songs.

The phrase "Unite and Win" refers to the desire for unification between the punk and skinhead subcultures. According to the band, if British working class people united, they would succeed in a fight against both the Margaret Thatcher government and totalitarian ideologies like communism and nazism (as described in the song, "Commies and Nazis").

== Track listing ==
1. "Punx 'n' Skins" – 3:40
2. "We Don't Need Them" – 2:35
3. "Kill the Bill" – 1:58
4. "Lowest of the Low" – 5:52
5. "Nuclear Waste" – 2:52
6. "Commies and Nazis" – 3:12
7. "Pigs for Slaughter" – 4:51
8. "Scum" – 2:02
9. "Thrown on the Scrapheap" – 3:40
10. "Punx Picnic in Prince's Street Gardens" – 3:50
11. "Mindless Few" – 4:34
12. "Unite and Win!" – 1:36
