= SS Politician (album) =

Compilation album by Oi Polloi
- Released: 2010
- Genre: Anarcho-punk

SS Politician is a compilation album, by the band Oi Polloi. It was released in 2010 on Skuld Records. Parts of the release are written in the Scottish Gaelic language. It includes the Mind The Bollocks EP, their side of the split with Israeli punk band Nikmat Olalim, a compilation track, and an extended version of SS Politician.

== Track listing ==
1. D.I.Y.
2. A Whole New Ballgame
3. Mutilation Of The Innocent
4. Violation
5. Òran Ball-coise
6. Deiseil 's Deònach
7. They Shoot Children
8. Saorsa Do Vanunu
9. Fuadaichean 2006
10. SS Politician (Extended Version)
