= Rapalje =

Dutch Celtic folk band

Rapalje is a Dutch Celtic folk band which performs Irish, Scottish and Dutch folk music and sings in English as well as in Dutch. The band consists of William van der Laan, David Myles, and Marcel "Maceál" Meijer. Former member Dieb den Boer left the band in April 2022.

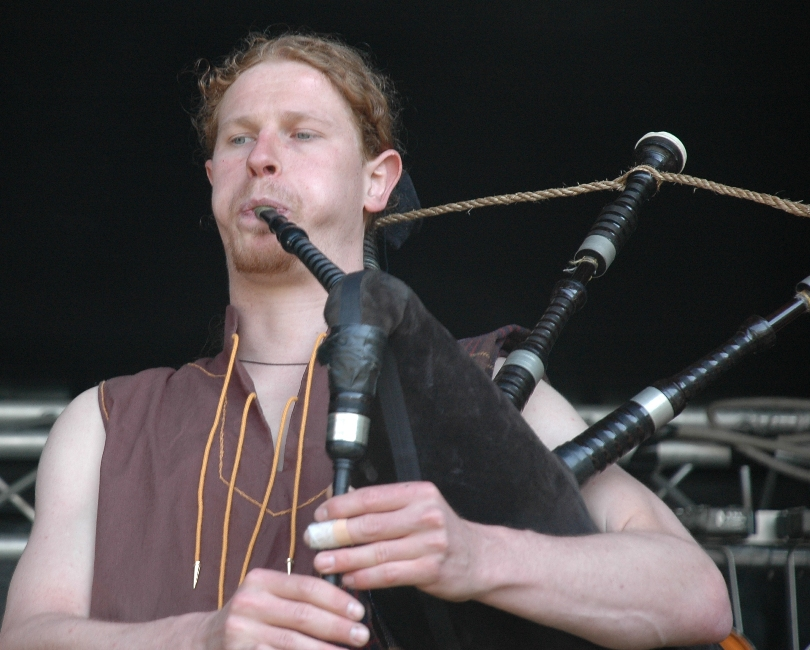
David Myles

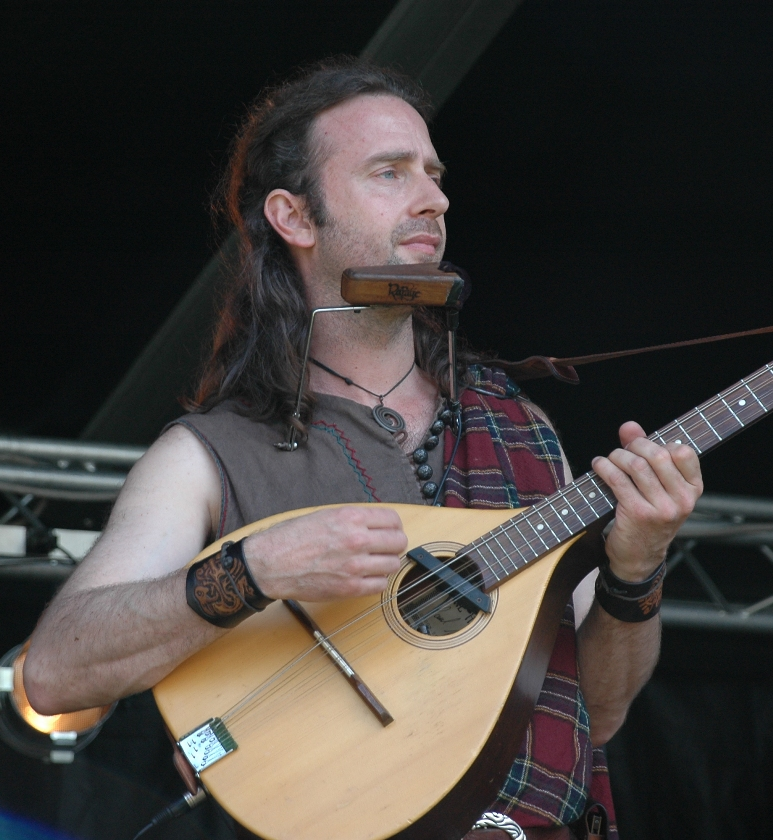
Maceál

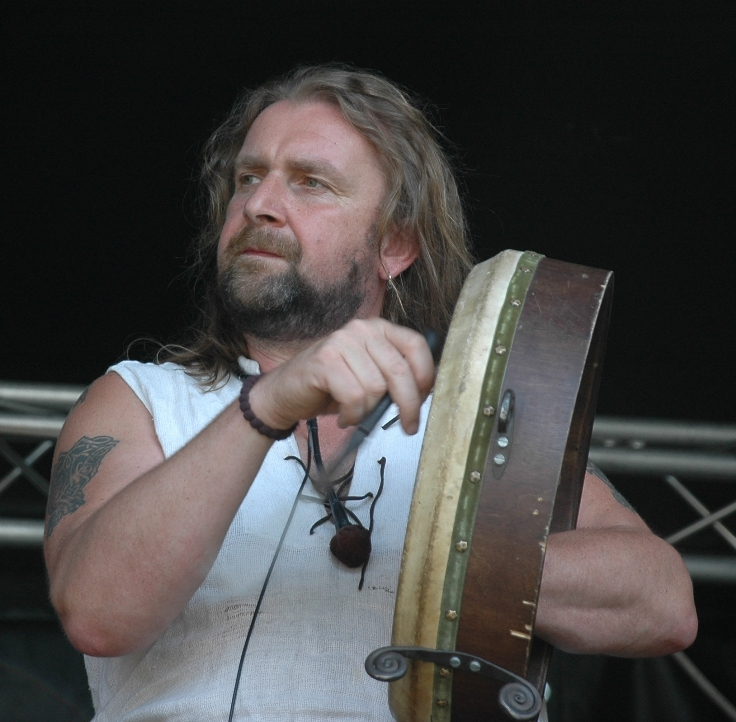
William

== Recordings ==
The band recorded 10 CD's, of which 3 were later compiled into 1 album, and 1 DVD.

- 1998: Into Folk
- 2000: Rakish Paddies (the compiled album)
- 2001: Alesia
- 2004: Spades / Schoppen
- 2004: Diamonds / Ruiten
- 2007: Celtic Fire (live recordings in theatres)
- 2008: Live DVD
- 2010: Double live CD
- 2012: Clubs
- 2014: Hearts
- 2019: Scotland's Story
