= Total Anarchoi =

Compilation album by Oi Polloi
- Released: 1992
- Genre: Anarcho-punk
- Label: Released Emotions Records

Oi Polloi chronology
Omnicide.... (1991)	Total Anarchoi (1992)	Fight Back! (1994)

Total Anarchoi is an anarcho-punk album, by the band Oi Polloi. It was released in 1992 both on CD and LP.

== Track listing ==
1. "Nuclear Waste"
2. "Boot Down The Door"
3. "Pigs For Slaughter"
4. "Scum"
5. "Thrown On The Scrap Heap"
6. "Punx Picnic In Prince's Street Gardens"
7. "Mindless Few"
8. "Unite And Win!" (Live)
9. "Omnicide" (Live)
10. "Americans Out" (Live)
11. "Pigs For Slaughter" (Live)
12. "Thugs In Uniforms" (Live)
13. "Nazi Scum" (Live)
14. "Nuclear Waste" (Live)
15. "Free The Henge" (Live)
16. "Punx Picnic In Prince's Street Gardens" (Live)
17. "State Violence, State Control" (CD Bonus)
18. "If The Kids Are United" (CD Bonus)
