= Scottish Gaelic punk =

Subgenre of punk rock

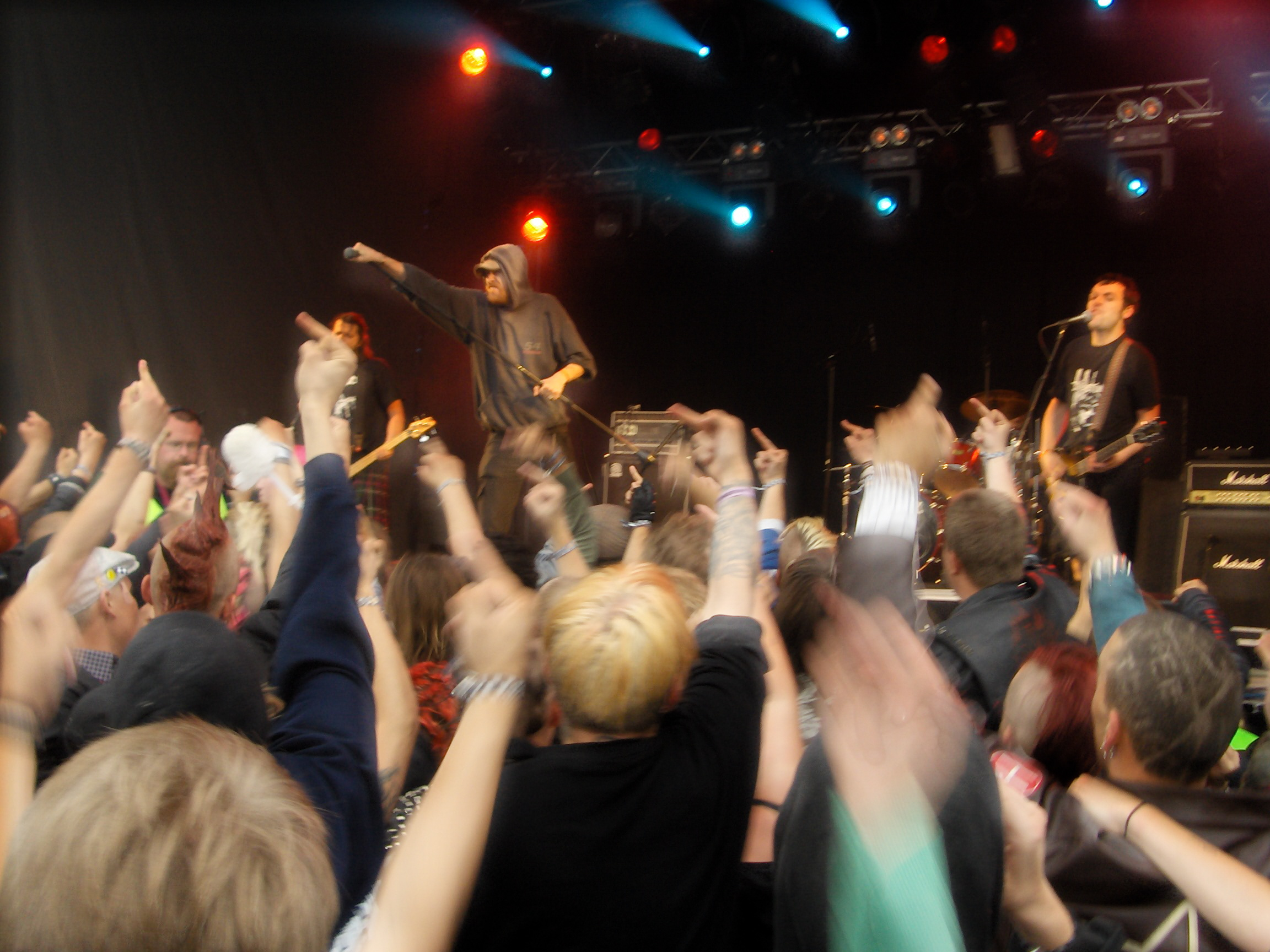
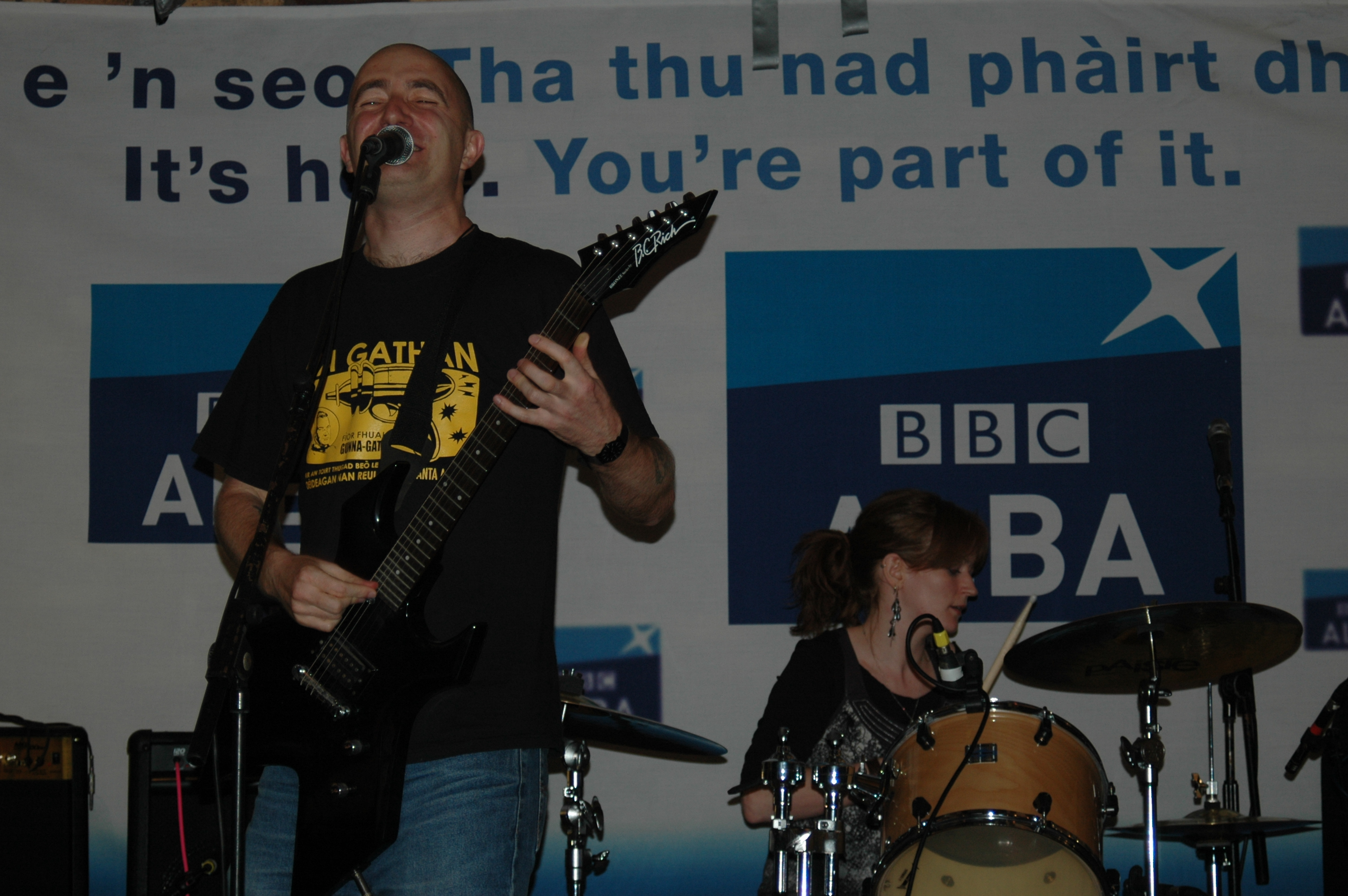
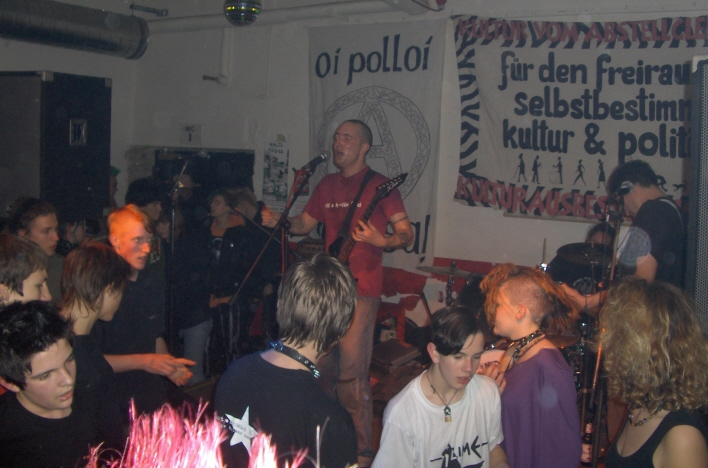
- , , From top to bottom: Scottish Gaelic punk bands Oi Polloi, Na Gathan and Mill a h-Uile Rud
- Other names: Gaelic punk
- Stylistic origins: Punk rock, Celtic rock, anarcho-punk
- Cultural origins: Scotland
- Typical instruments: Electric guitars, electric bass guitar, drum kit, vocals, electronic keyboard, bagpipes

Fusion genres
- Anarcho-punk

Other topics
- Scottish Gaelic, anarcho-punk, anarchism and the arts, Celtic punk

Scottish Gaelic punk (also known as Gaelic punk) is a subgenre of punk rock in which bands sing some or all of their music in Scottish Gaelic. The Gaelic punk scene is, in part, an affirmation of the value of minority languages and cultures. Gaelic punk bands express political views, particularly those related to anarchism and environmentalism.

== History ==
Punk in the Welsh language, particularly the bands connected with the Anhrefn record label, was an early inspiration to the Gaelic punk scene in Scotland. The Scottish rock band Runrig's first album (Play Gaelic) in 1978 is considered to be the first notable modern Scottish Gaelic-language music album; other than Ultravox's 1984 album "Lament", which contained some Gaelic lyrics in the song Man of Two Worlds, and mid-1990s grindcore band Scatha, from Tomintoul who featured Gaelic in several of their songs, there were no further albums of modern music all in Gaelic until spring 2005, when Oi Polloi and Mill a h-Uile Rud both released all-Gaelic EPs.

Mill a h-Uile Rud, based in Seattle, United States, formed in Scotland, and have played at least as many concerts in Europe as they have in the United States. All of their material is in Gaelic. They are occasionally active, although they have not released any new material in some time. Oi Polloi, from Edinburgh, Scotland started performing in English in 1981. They released a Gaelic EP, Carson?, in 2005, followed by an all-Gaelic LP, Ar Ceòl, Ar Cànan, Ar-a-mach, in 2006, and the all-Gaelic LP, Dùisg!, in 2012. Their live set features a mix of English and Gaelic material, although they tend to favour the Gaelic material when they play in Scotland. At some concerts in Portree and Stornoway, all of their songs and stage banter were in Gaelic.

The backgrounds of the musicians in the subgenre are diverse, from Tim (Mill a h-Uile Rud), who hails from Seattle in the United States, to Anna Rothach (Nad Aislingean and Oi Polloi), who was born and raised in South Uist. The uniting feature of all of these bands is that most of the Gaelic-speaking members have spent some time at Sabhal Mòr Ostaig, a Gaelic college on the Isle of Skye. In DIY-punk style, the Gaelic punks started out by teaching each other the language at Gaelic for Punks classes; first held at the Edinburgh European City of Punk festival in 1997. After these individuals gained fluency, they took advantage of scholarships available at Sabhal Mòr Ostaig, and there has been a small, but steady, stream of punks at the college ever since.

The Gaelic punk band Mill a h-Uile Rud were featured in the BBC arts documentary series Ealtainn, which followed them on a tour of Europe and filmed them at concerts in the Gaelic-speaking heartland of the Isle of Lewis. The Scotsman, a national Scottish paper based in Edinburgh, regularly covers the Gaelic punk scene, and the American publications Maximum Rocknroll and Punk Planet have carried features on the subgenre.

== Notable releases ==
- Carson? (2005), Oi Polloi. This vinyl EP was the release that launched the subgenre.
- "Ceàrr" (2005), Mill a h-Uile Rud. This CD EP was the first ever CD released of all-original new compositions in Gaelic. The liner-notes in the CD are also exclusively in Gaelic.
- "Ar Cànan, Ar Ceòl, Ar-a-mach" (2005), Oi Polloi. This is the first full-length rock LP sung entirely in Gaelic since Runrig released their Play Gaelic LP in 1979. Lyrics and sleeve-notes are entirely in Gaelic and English translations are only available on their website.
- "Ceòl Gàidhlig Mar Sgian Nad Amhaich" (2006). Four songs, one each by Oi Polloi, Mill a h-Uile Rud, Nad Aislingean and Atomgevitter.
- "Gàidhlig na Lasair" (2006). Fifteen songs by Oi Polloi, Mill a h-Uile Rud, Nad Aislingean and Atomgevitter, and the 80s new wave band The Thing Upstairs.
- "Togaibh Ur Guth" (2011) by An t-Uabhas.
- "Dùisg" (2012) by Oi Polloi.
- "Luathas-teichidh" le Drilseach (2014).
