= Mill a h-Uile Rud =

Seattle-based Scottish Gaelic band

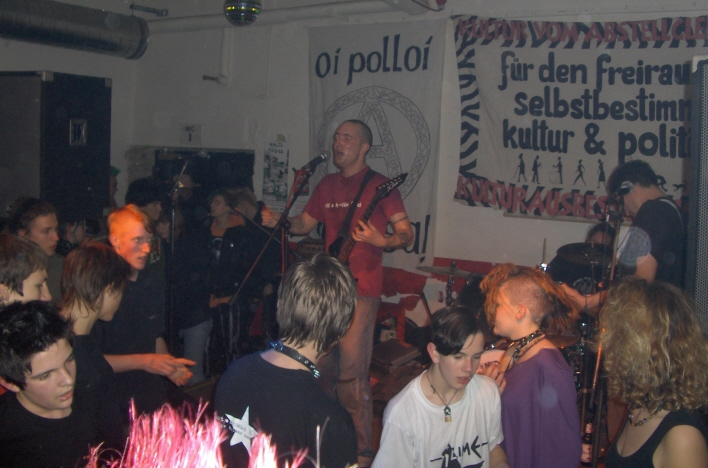
- Mill a h-Uile Rud playing at the KAW in Leverkusen, Germany

Background information
- Origin: Seattle, Washington, USA; Isle of Skye, Scotland, UK
- Genres: Celtic punk, Scottish Gaelic punk
- Years active: 2003–present
- Labels: Problem? Records
- Members: Tim Armstrong; Sgrios a h-Uile Rud; Sìne Nic Anndrais

Mill a h-Uile Rud ([ˈmiːʎ ə ˈxulə ˈrˠut̪]) is a Seattle-based band who sing in Scottish Gaelic.

== The band ==
The name translates as 'Destroy Everything'. The band sings entirely in Scottish Gaelic, which has proved something of a novelty in Scotland and has gained them considerable coverage in English, Scottish Gaelic, Irish language, and other Celtic language media.

Although Oi Polloi released the first Gaelic Punk album 'Carson?' in 2003, Mill a h-Uile Rud's 'Ceàrr' was the first CD of all new Gaelic songs ever released. Ceàrr was also the first CD produced with exclusively Gaelic liner notes and the official Mill a h-Uile Rud website was the first all-Gaelic band website. Ceàrr was recorded in a studio in Port Townsend Washington in 2005 for $400 (about £200) in just two days. The recording was virtually 'live'; the band only did two takes of each song. In 2006, the band recorded three other songs in a slightly more professional setting; these songs appeared on the compilation albums 'Ceòl Gàidhlig mar Sgian nad Amhaich' and 'Gàidhlig na Lasair.'

== Biography ==
The band formed in 2003 and retain their original line-up of Tim Armstrong (vocals, guitar), Sgrios a h-Uile Rud (vocals, bass) and Sìne Nic Anndrais (drums). (This Tim Armstrong is a different person from the Tim Armstrong from Berkeley who sings in the punk band Rancid.) Originally from Seattle, Armstrong was a member of several punk bands in Brunswick, Maine in the late eighties, including Officer Friendly. After spending some years living in Scotland and meeting other Gaelic-speaking punks such as Ruairidh of Oi Polloi, both Tim and Sìne, whose mother is from the Gaelic-speaking island of Benbecula, started learning Gaelic.

In April 2005, Mill a h-Uile Rud embarked on a European tour with Oi Polloi which took in Scotland, Belgium, the Netherlands, Germany and Poland. Much of this tour was filmed by BBC Alba for a Gaelic television documentary on Mill a h-Uile Rud and Gaelic punk. They have also played in Stornoway, on the sparsely populated Isle of Lewis, the largest town in the Western Isles of Scotland. They also recorded a live session for the BBC Radio nan Gaidheal nighttime 'Rapal' program which is broadcast nationally in Scotland. In 2005, Tim moved to Scotland full-time to study sociolinguistics and language revival—he is a lecturer at Sabhal Mòr Ostaig—and as such, the band is less active, although they still play from time to time when Tim is back in the Seattle. Tim was also involved in the Gaelic techno/hip-hop act, Nad Aislingean, the Gaelic rock band, Na Gathan and in 2013 published Air Cuan Dubh Drilseach, the first Scottish Gaelic science fiction novel, published by CLÀR. The book was launched in Edinburgh with Mill a h-Uile Rud's contemporaries Oi Polloi at an illegal street gig on Leith Walk outside Elvis Shakespeare, and later at The Cruz boat on The Shore with Comann Ceilteach Oilthigh Dhun Eideann and CLÀR. Sgrios remains quite active in the Seattle folk-punk scene and is involved in a number of bands in the city while Sìne now runs a goat cheese farm outside of Seattle and researches farming culture. Only their roadie, Erin, still lives on the remote punk commune in the mountains outside Seattle where the band was formed.

== Views and lyrical topics ==
Mill a h-Uile Rud broke new ground in Gaelic music, but they now admit that when they started they didn't fully understand the Gaelic music scene. In an interview aired on BBC Alba, Tim explained, "In the beginning we were so naive," and that it wasn't until later that they appreciated the novelty of what they were doing. Song topics frequently deal with sex which is unusual for contemporary Gaelic music. However the band and others contend that this is in keeping with Gaelic bardic tradition and traditional poets from past centuries such as Iain Lom and Alasdair MacMhaighstir Alasdair. As a band, Mill a h-Uile Rud are highly critical of much Celtic Punk that, in their opinion, sells a cheesy, beer-soaked stereotype of Gaelic culture. They are also noted for their hard-core stance on Gaelic use in and around the band. In a Gaelic music scene where the language is often exploited as a showcase without much actual practical use outside of the songs themselves, Mill a h-Uile Rud stand out for not only singing in Gaelic, but using it in packaging, on their websites, on the stage and with each other. Mill a h-Uile Rud have also never allowed any official translations of their songs.

They have also translated the Ramones' "Sheena Is a Punk Rocker" into Gaelic and play it in their live set.

== Discography ==
- 2004: Ceàrr (Clàran Droch-Shùil)
- 2005: Ceòl Gàidhlig mar Sgian nad Amhaich ("Steòrnabhagh"; one track on a four-band compilation single)
- 2006: Gàidhlig na Lasair ("Steòrnabhagh," "Oran Sabaid Sabhal Mòr Ostaig" and "Crath do Thòn"; three tracks on a five-band compilation CD)
