= Alexander Chalmers (mayor) =

Mayor of Old Warsaw

Mayor of Old Warsaw
- In office 1702–1703
- In office 1696–1696
- In office 1694–1694
- In office 22 February 1691 – 1692

Member of Old Warsaw Town Council
- In office 1697–1701
- In office 1692–1694
- In office 1688–1690

Advocate of Old Warsaw
- In office 1701–1701

Deputy mayor of Old Warsaw
- In office 1697–1697

Member of the Election Sejm
- In office 1697–1697
- Constituency: Old Warsaw

Member of the Board of Twenty of Old Warsaw
- In office 14 January 1681 – 1682

Personal details
- Born: 1645 Dyce, Scotland
- Died: 9 March 1703 (aged 57–58) Old Warsaw, Polish–Lithuanian Commonwealth (now Warsaw, Poland)
- Occupation: Merchant; jurist; city clerk

Alexander Chalmers (/ˈtʃɑːmərz/; 1645 – 9 March 1703; Polish: Aleksander Czamer, [a.lɛkˈsan.dɛr ˈt͡ʂa.mɛr]) was a Scottish-born Polish merchant, jurist, and politician. He was the mayor of the town of Old Warsaw (now part of Warsaw, Poland) from 1691 to 1692, from 1694, 1696, and from 1702 to 1703, and a member of the Old Warsaw Town Council from 1688 to 1690, from 1692 to 1694, and from 1697 to 1701.

== Biography ==
Alexander Chalmers was born in 1645, in Dyce, Kingdom of Scotland (now part of the United Kingdom). At some point he converted to Catholicism.

Chalmers emigrated to the Polish–Lithuanian Commonwealth in 1659, at the age of 14. He eventually settled in the town of Old Warsaw (now part of Warsaw, Poland). There, Chalmers married Krystyne Legowna (also listed in some sources as Christina Lang) and they both engaged in the textile trade. They both became citizens of the town in 1672. He also began using Polonised version of his name, which was Aleksander Czamer. In 1676, king John III Sobieski confirmed the rights of the eight Scottish merchants who served his court, including Chalmers. Chalmers was also a leader of the Scottish community in Old Warsaw.

He became involved in municipal activities in 1679. From 14 January 1681 to 1682, Chalmers was a member of the Board of Twenty of Old Warsaw, and from 1688 to 1690, from 1692, 1694, and from 1697 to 1701, he was a member of the Old Warsaw Town Council. From 1687, Chalmers was also the treasurer of Old Warsaw. On 22 February 1691, he was elected as the mayor of Old Warsaw, and served his first term until 1692. Chalmers served three more terms; in 1694, in 1696, and from 1702 to 1703. He was also the advocate of Old Warsaw in 1701.

Additionally, in 1697, Chalmers served as the deputy mayor of Old Warsaw. He was also participated in an election sejm during the 1697 Polish–Lithuanian royal election, representing Old Warsaw. While deputy mayor, Chalmers entered into a conflict with the Dominican Order, which organised congregation in the town without paying fees. It led to a riot in November 1767, near the St. Hyacinth Church. One person died during the riot, and the aftermath led to long-lasting disagreement between the town and the Catholic Church. Afterwards, the town court ruled in favour of the Dominican Order, and removed Chalmers from his position, and barred him from holding a public office for three years.

In addition to these roles, Chalmers was also an assessor from 1683 to 1687, and a lay judge in 1703. He was also a provisor of the Hospital of the Holy Spirit from 16 June 1695 to 28 February 1699.

Chalmers owned the Falkiewicz Tenement at 28 Old Town Market Square, and the Shoemakers Tenement at 10 Wąski Dunaj Street. In 1690, the town authorities decided to grant Chalmers and his wife, a piece of land in perpetuity for an annual fee of 20 florins.

Chalmers died on 9 March 1703, at the age of 58, and was buried in Archcathedral Basilica of St. John the Baptist.

He had a son, Wilhelm Czamer, who also served as the mayor of Old Warsaw in 1722.

== Legacy ==
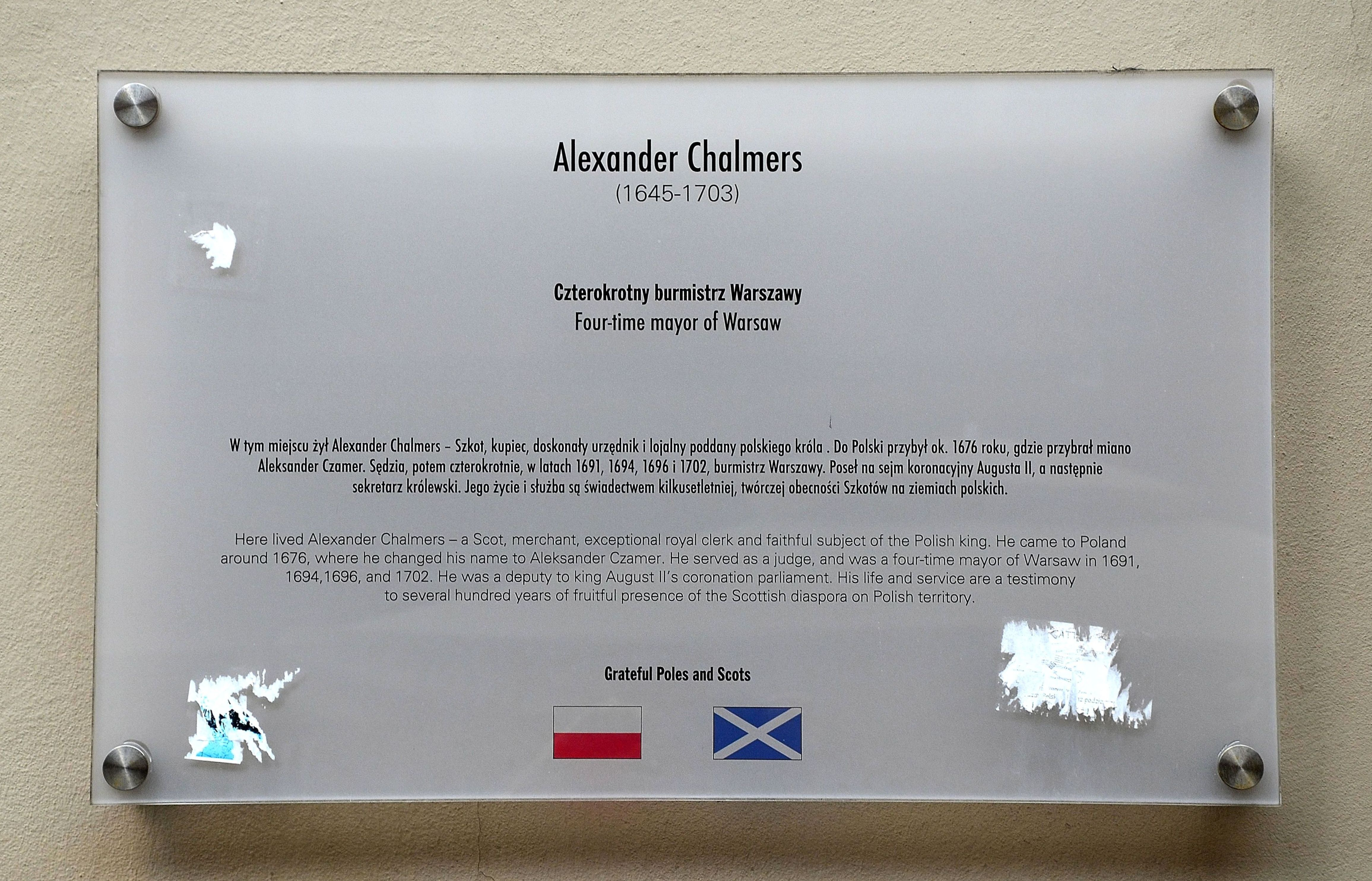
A plaque commemorating Alexander Chalmers, installed on the elevation of the Shoemakers Tenement, located at 10 Wąski Dunaj Street in Warsaw.

A plaque commemorating Alexander Chalmers is placed on the elevation of the Shoemakers Tenement, located at 10 Wąski Dunaj Street in Warsaw, at the corner with Szeroki Dunaj Street. The building used to be owned by him. The plaque was unveiled on 16 November 2008, by Linda Fabiani, the Minister for Europe, External Affairs, and Culture of the Scottish Parliament. The unveiling ceremony was attended by around thirty people.
