= Omnicide (album) =

Omnicide....

EP by Oi Polloi
- Released: 1991
- Venue: Edingburgh, Scotland
- Studio: Pier House Studios
- Genre: Anarcho punk
- Label: Words of Warning

Oi Polloi chronology
In Defence of Our Earth (1990)	Omnicide.... (1991)	Total Anarchoi (1992)

Omnicide.... is an anarcho-punk 7-inch EP, by the band Oi Polloi. It was released in 1991 by Words of Warning Records. The initial run of the record sold out and was never re-released. It has been commented by the band that they were not happy with the way this record turned out (Deek's vocals in particular are very unusual), which led to the re-recording of "Victims of a Gas Attack", and the tracks "Dealer in Death" and "Die for B.P." being rewritten as "John Major, Fuck You!" and "Let the Boots Do the Talking" respectively. These tracks can also be found on the "Six of the Best" compilation CD.

== Track listing ==
1. "Dealer in Death"
2. "Omnicide"
3. "Victims of a Gas Attack"
4. "Die for B.P."
5. "Rich Man's World"
