= Carson? =

EP by Oi Polloi
- Released: 2003
- Genre: Anarcho punk
- Label: Nikt Nic Nie Wie

Carson? is an EP-length vinyl record by the Gaelic punk group Oi Polloi. This release is significant as it is the first record of all-original rock songs in Scottish Gaelic, beating the EP CD, Ceàrr, by Mill a h-Uile Rud, to release by one month. Runrig's first album, Play Gaelic, was also all in Gaelic, but several of the tunes were rock re-workings of traditional songs. "Carson?" is Scottish Gaelic for "Why?", and the title track features an extended excerpt from a BBC radio interview with the Gaelic poet, Sorley MacLean, where the poet discussed the suppression of the Gaelic language.

== Track listing ==
1. "Carson" (3:20)
2. "An Drochaid Thoraidh" (2:43)
3. "Cumhachd Niuclach? Cha Ghabh Idir!" (2:36)
