= Oi Polloi =

Scottish punk rock band

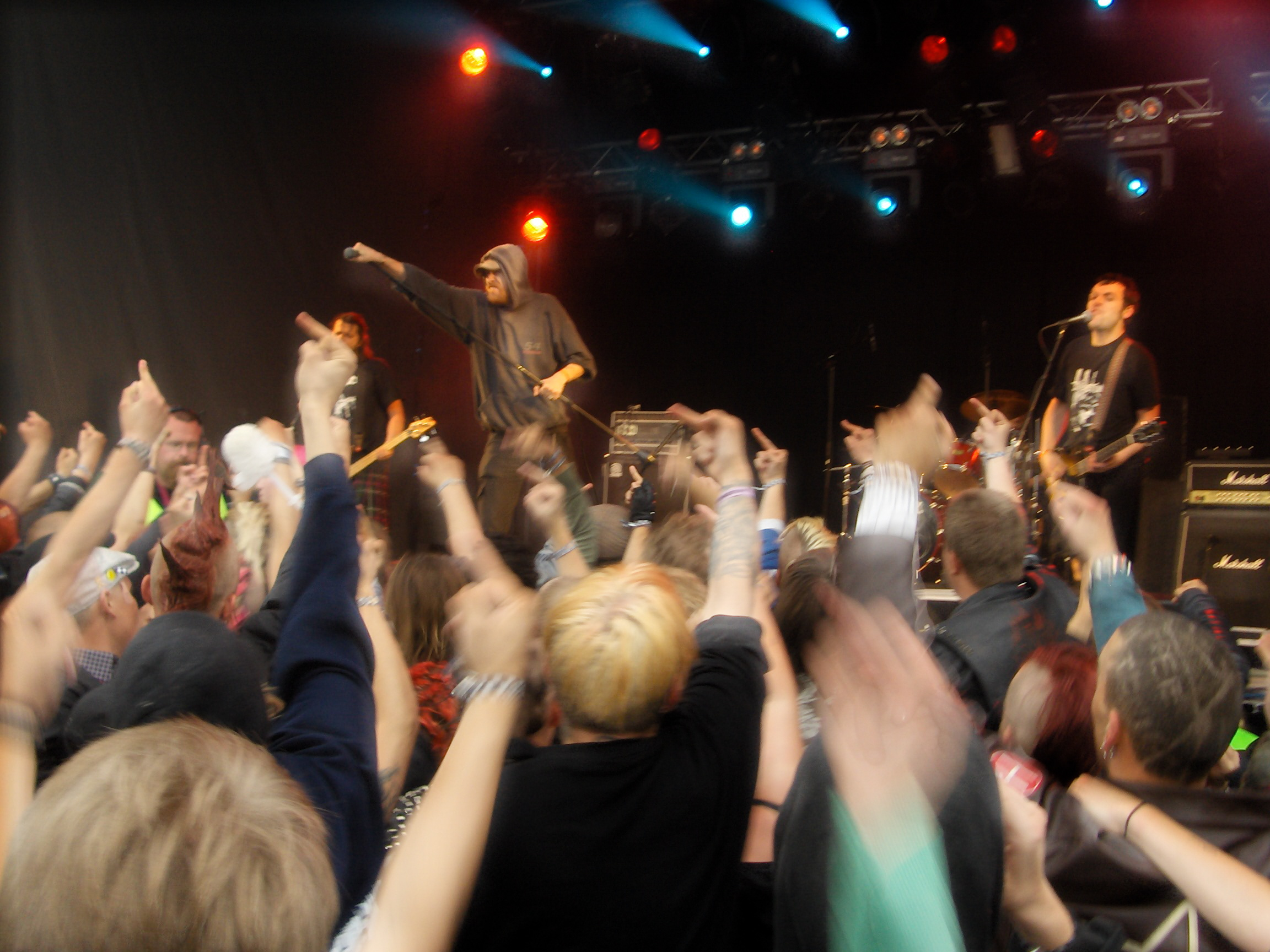
- Oi Polloi playing at Augustibuller in Sweden in 2005

Background information
- Origin: Edinburgh, Scotland
- Genres: Anarcho-punk; Oi!; hardcore punk; crust punk; Scottish Gaelic punk
- Years active: 1981–present
- Labels: Campary, Ruptured Ambitions, Words of Warning, Oi!, Green Vomit
- Spinoffs: Broccoli
- Members: Deek Allen Oigridh; Olsen = Andy MacVannan
- Past members: Ade (drummer); Matt Finch (guitar); Dirty Dave Campbell (guitar); Yaga (guitar); Derek Reid (bass); Riley Briggs (guitar); Murray Briggs (drums); Grant Thorburn (drums); Chris Low (drums) Kev McInally (drums); Graeme Gilmour (drums); Grant 'Muz' Munro (bass); Chris Willsher (drums); Goz (bass); Calum Mackenzie (bass); Brian Tipa; David Connolly (“Rat”)Cameron Tongs others

Oi Polloi are a punk rock band from Scotland that formed around 1981. Starting as an Oi! band, they are now generally more associated with the anarcho-punk genre. The band has become notable for their contributions to the Scottish Gaelic punk subgenre. The name comes from the Greek expression "οἱ πολλοί", Anglicized hoi polloi, meaning "the masses" or "the common people".

The band has gone through about 50 members since their formation, and their only permanent member has been vocalist Deek Allen, who has also been involved in Gaelic-language television. The band has included punks and skinheads. The members have been supporters of Anti-Fascist Action and Earth First!, and they use the motto "No Compromise in Defence of Our Earth," which is an adaptation of Earth First!'s motto. They support direct action in defence of the environment, hunt sabotage, as well as resistance to racism, sexism, homophobia, fascism and imperialism. They are also supporters of Linux and criticized Microsoft in their song, L.I.N.U.X.

== Career ==
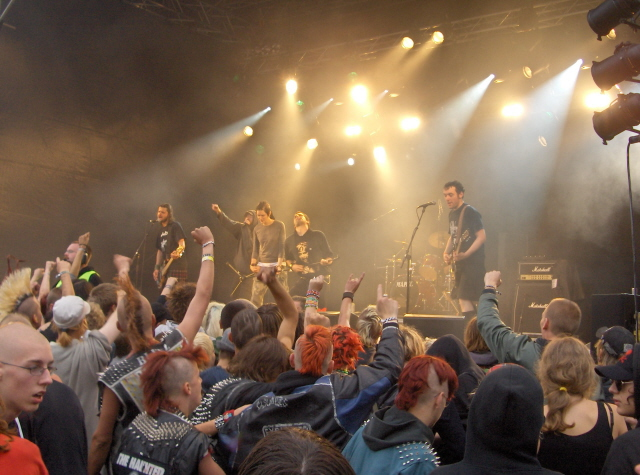
Oi Polloi performing at Augustibuller festival in Lindeberg, Sweden in August 2005.

After gigs in the Edinburgh area and the recording of the band's self-recorded first cassette demo, Last of the Mohicans, drummer Stu "Doccy" Dunn left to become a karate instructor. A second studio demo, Green Anarchoi and their first vinyl EP, Resist the Atomic Menace, followed.

Oi Polloi started singing in Scottish Gaelic in 1996, recording the Carson? EP, (2003), then recording and releasing the full-length LP Ar Ceòl Ar Cànan Ar-A-Mach in 2006. The band members also use Scottish Gaelic in day-to-day communications.

In 2013, they collaborated with CLÀR, a Scottish Gaelic publisher, to launch Air Cuan Dubh Drilseach, a Gaelic science fiction novel by Tim Armstrong, the singer of Mill a h-Uile Rud, at events at Elvis Shakespeare on Leith Walk and on The Cruz Boat at the shore in Leith.

== Legacy and influence ==
Steve Von Till of American avant-garde metal group Neurosis cited the band as an influence, along with other British Anarcho-punk bands of the early 80s.

== Discography ==
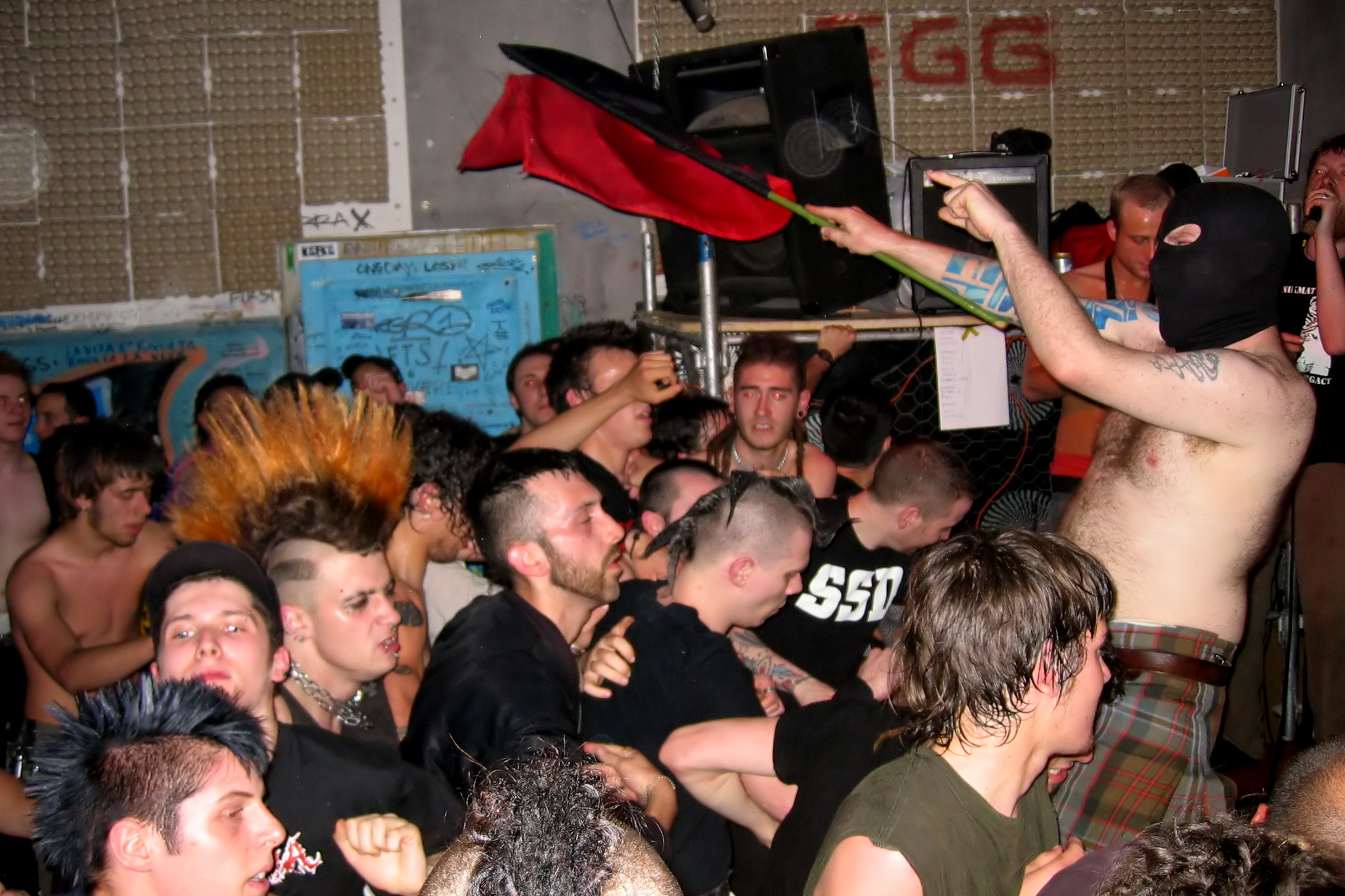
Oi Polloi live in 2006.

=== 12" LPs ===
- Skins 'N' Punks Volume Two (Split w Betrayed) 1986
- Unlimited Genocide (Split w A.O.A.) 1986
- Mad As... (Split w Toxik Ephex) 1987
- Unite And Win (Oi! Records) 1987
- In Defence of Our Earth (Words of Warning Records) 1990
- You've Heard It All Before (Track on The Crass Covers Compilation album) (Ruptured Ambitions Records) 1993
- Fight Back! (Re-Release of Old Split Material) 1994
- Total Anarchoi (Live/Studio Collection – CD/LP) 1996
- Fuaim Catha (Skuld Records) 1999
- Outraged by the System (Step-1 Music) 2002
- Heavenly Peace (split 12-inch EP w/ Nikmat Olalim, Campari Records) 2006
- Ar Ceòl Ar Cànan Ar-A-Mach (self release/Campari records/Nikt Nic Nie Wie) 2006
- Gaidhlig na Lasair (compilation of underground Gaelic punk and techno) (Problem? Records) 2006
- Total Resistance to the Fucking System (Plastic Bomb) 2008
- SS Politician (Chaosrurale Records/Active Rebellion) 2010
- Duisg! (Plastic Bomb/Active Rebellion) 2012
- Saorsa (Ruin Nation Records) 2016

=== 7" EPs ===
- Resist the Atomic Menace 1986 (re-released 1994)
- Outrage 1988
- Omnicide 1991 (Words of Warning Records)
- Guilty (Ruptured Ambitions Records) 1993
- Oi Polloi / Blownapart Bastards (Split) 1994
- Oi Polloi - s/t (Nikt Nic Nie Wie)
- Bare Faced Hypocrisy Sells Records The Anti-Chumbawamba EP w/Riot/Clone, The Bus Station Loonies, Anxiety Society, The Chineapple Punks, Love Chips and Peas, and Wat Tyler 1998 (Ruptured Ambitions Records)
- THC (Campary Rec.) 1998
- Let the Boots Do the Talking (Ruptured Ambitions Records) 1999
- Carson? (Nikt Nic Nie Wie) 2003
- Ceòl Gàidhlig mar Sgian nad Amhaich (compilation with Mill a h-Uile Rud, Atomgevitter and Nad Aislingean) (Problem Records) 2005
- Mind the Bollocks (Kämäset Levyt Records) 2007
- Cyklopen split EP with Kansalaistottelemattomuus 2010
- Split EP with Appalachian Terror Unit Profane Existence (US)/NNNW (Europe) 2011
- Split EP with Na Gathan (Limited May Tour Edition) Problem Records 2012

=== DVD ===
Oi Polloi: The Movie

== See also ==
- Mill a h-Uile Rud
- Dominic Waxing Lyrical
