= Celtic diaspora =

Celtic diaspora may refer to any of the following diasporas of Celtic people:

- Cornish diaspora
- Irish diaspora
- Scottish diaspora
- Welsh people § Welsh diaspora
