= Nicolas Lenglet Du Fresnoy =

French scholar, historian, geographer, philosopher and bibliographer of alchemy

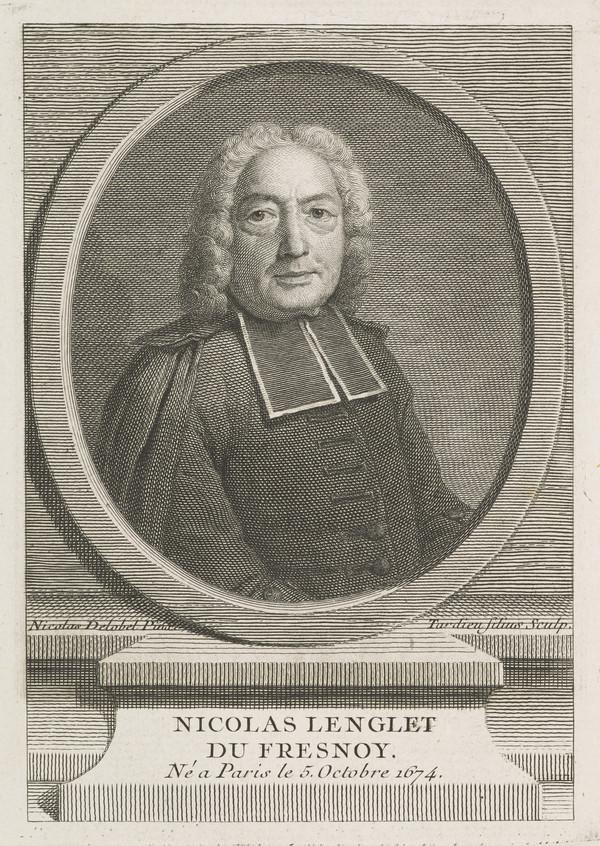
- Born: 5 October 1674; Beauvais, France
- Died: 16 January 1755 (aged 80); Paris, France
- Occupations: Historian; Geographer; Bibliographer

Nicolas Lenglet Du Fresnoy (5 October 1674 – 16 January 1755) was a French scholar, historian, geographer, philosopher, and bibliographer of alchemy.

== Biography ==
Lenglet Du Fresnoy first studied theology but quickly left it for diplomacy and politics. In 1705, Jean-Baptiste Colbert de Torcy appointed him Secretary for Latin and French languages to the Elector of Cologne, who lived in Lille. During the Regency, he returned to Paris, and in 1718 the Regent took advantage of his skill to discover some accomplices in the Cellamare Conspiracy.

Afterward, Lenglet busied himself with his scholarly work and refused all offers made to him in France or abroad. Biting and sarcastic, he had many enemies, which made him proud. As he put it, I want to be a frank Gaul in my style, as in my actions. His love of independence and opposition to royal censors earned him, under Louis XV, five periods of imprisonment in the Bastille, once in the Strasbourg citadel another time in the Château de Vincennes. He died at age 81 after falling in the fireplace close to which he was reading. He was buried in the church or in the cemetery of the Église Saint-Séverin in Paris.

Lenglet, whose books contain treasures of erudition, was interested both in literary criticism as in hermetic philosophy, history, and geography. He edited the Roman de la Rose, Marot, Sigogne, Régnier, Motin, Berthelot, Maynard, La Henriade by Voltaire, Mémoires by Philippe de Comines, Pierre de L'Estoile, etc.

He reviewed articles on history and even wrote some in full for the Encyclopédie by Diderot and D’Alembert. He wrote under the pseudonyms "Edward Melton," "Albert Van Heussen," "C. Gordon de Percel," and "Gosford." He also wrote in Latin under the pen name "Lengletius."

In 1681, Géraud de Cordemoy published an anti-protestantist book, the conférence entre Luther et le diable au sujet de la messe with his commentaries, republished and widely distributed in 1875 by Isidore Liseux with commentaries by Nicolas Lenglet Du Fresnoy.

== Bibliography ==
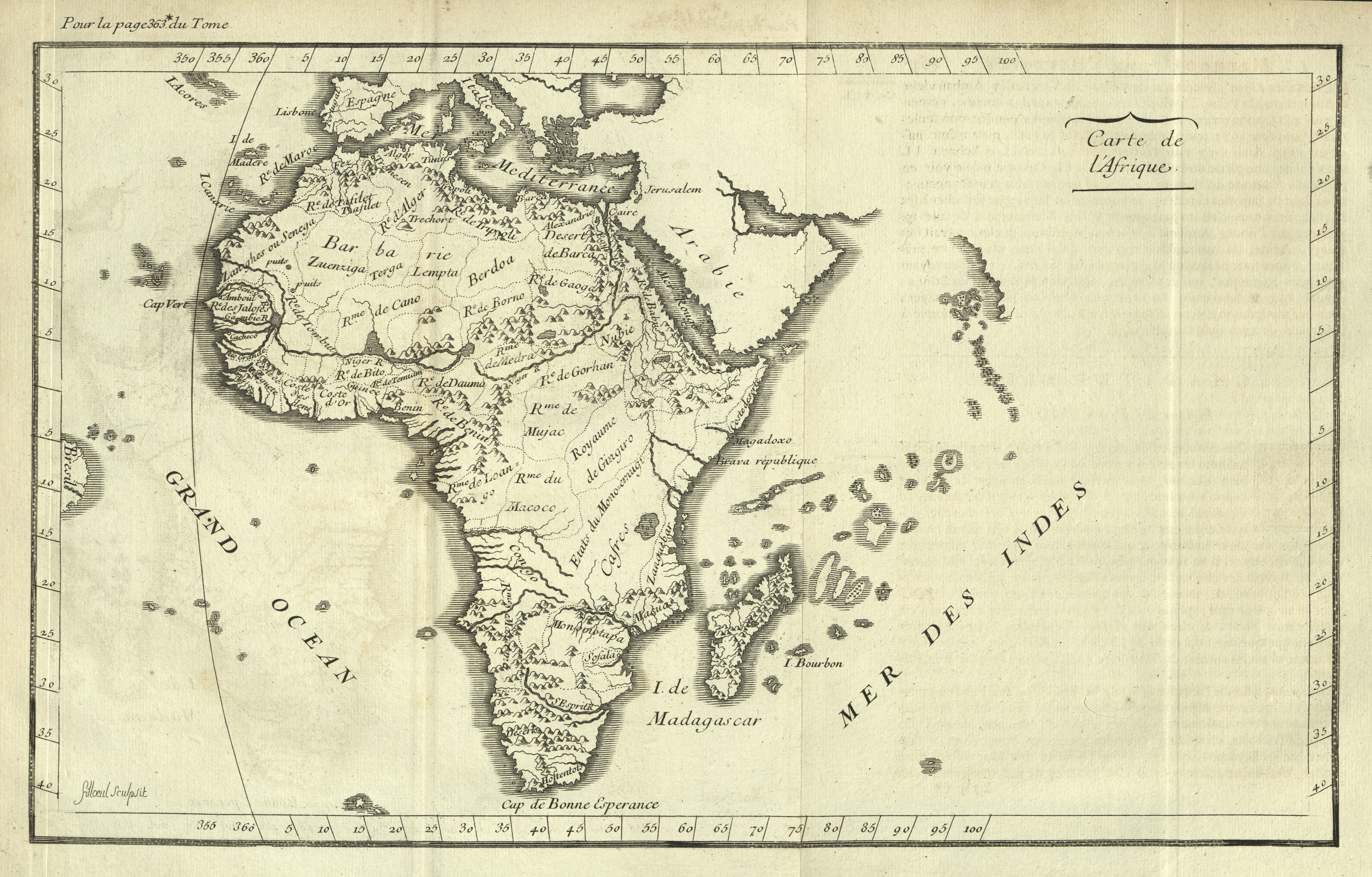
Lenglet Du Fresnoy's Carte de l'Afrique, 1729

- 1708: Traité historique et dogmatique du secret inviolable de la confession, où l’on montre quelle a toûjours été à ce sujet la doctrine, & la discipline de l’Eglise, avec resolution de plusieurs difficultez, qui surviennent tous les jours sur cette matière, Paris, Jean Musier.
- 1711: Cinquième [- sixième] mémoire sur les collations des canonicats de la cathédrale de Tournay, Tournay, Louis Varlé.
- 1711: Mémoires sur la collation des canonicats de l’église cathedrale de Tournay, faite par leurs hautes puissances nosseigneurs les Etats Généraux des Provinces Unies, Tournay, Louis Varlé.
- 1714: Méthode pour étudier l’histoire : Où après avoir établi les principes & l’ordre qu’on doit tenir la lire utilement, on fait les remarques nécessaires pour ne se pas laisser tromper dans sa lecture : avec un catalogue des principaux historiens, & des remarques critiques sur la bonté de leurs ouvrages, & sur le choix des meilleures editions, Brussels, Aux dépens de la Compagnie.
- 1718: Méthode pour étudier la geographie; Où l’on donne une description exacte de l’univers, formée sur les observations de l’Académie Royale des Sciences, & sur les auteurs originaux. Avec un discours préliminaire sur l’étude de cette science, & un catalogue des cartes, relations, voyages & descriptions nécessaires pour la géographie, Amsterdam, aux dépens de la Compagnie.
- 1729: Tablettes chronologiques de l’histoire universelle : sacrée et profane, ecclésiastique et civile, depuis la création du monde, jusqu’à l’an 1762 : avec des réflexions sur l’ordre qu’on doit tenir, & sur les ouvrages nécessaires pour l’étude de l’histoire, Paris, Pierre Gandouin.
- 1735: De l’usage des romans, où l’on fait voir leur utilité et leurs différents caractères : avec une bibliothèque des romans accompagnée de remarques critiques sur leur choix et leurs éditions, Geneva, Slatkine reprints, 1970. An analysis of this book can be found in the article Réflexions sur le roman au XVIIIe siècle.
- 1735: L’Histoire justifiée contre les romans, Amsterdam, Aux dépens de la Compagnie.
- 1735: Principes de l’histoire pour l’éducation de la jeunesse, par années et par leçons, Paris, Pierre Gandouin.
- 1736: Géographie des enfans, ou, Méthode abrégée de la géographie, divisée par leçons, avec la liste des principales cartes nécessaires aux enfans, Paris, Rollin fils, De Bure l’aîné.
- 1736: Défense de la nation Hollandoise, contre les calomnies répandues dans les Lettres sur les Hollandois, et dans la Méthode pour étudier l’histoire, The Hague.
- 1739: Lettre de M. l’Abbé Lenglet du Fresnoy a l’Auteur des Observations sur les ecrits modernes. Au sujet de la méthode pour étudier la géographie, The Hague, J. Neaulme.
- 1739: Supplément de la Méthode pour étudier l’histoire : avec un supplément au catalogue des historiens, & des remarques sur la bonté & le choix de leurs editions, Paris, Rollin fils, DeBure l’aîné.
- 1742: La messe des fideles, avec une explication historique et dogmatique du sacrifice de la Sainte Messe, et des pratiques de pieté : Pour honorer le Très-Saint Sacrement, avec des Maximes des Saints Peres pour tous les jours du mois., Paris, Damonneville.
- 1745: Lettres d’un pair de la Grande Bretagne à Milord Archevêque de Cantorberi sur l’état présent des affaires de l’Europe, London, Innys.
- 1745: L’Europe pacifiée par l’équité de la Reine de Hongrie, ou distribution légale de la Succession d’Autriche, Brussels, F. Foppens.
- 1745: Mémoires pour servir à l’histoire de Charles IX, et de Henri IV, rois de France: contenant, en quatre parties, les pieces importantes ... et quantite de remarques historiques et critiques, qui servent à leur éclaircissement, Paris, Aux frais & dépens de l’editeur.
- 1747: Recueil de romans historiques, London.
- 1751: Recueil de Dissertations, anciennes et nouvelles, sur les Apparitions, les Visions et les Songes, Avignon.
- 1751: Traité historique et dogmatique sur les apparitions, les visions & les révélations particulières. Avec des observations sur les dissertations du R.P. Dom Calmet, abbé de Senones, sur les apparitions & les revenans, Avignon and Paris, Leloup.
- 1753–1754 Histoire de Jeanne d’Arc, dite la Pucelle d’Orleans, vierge, héroïne et martyre d’état : suscitée par la providence pour rétablir la monarchie françoise, Paris, Coutellier.
- 1766: Géographie abrégée par demandes et par réponses, divisée par leçons, pour l’instruction de la jeunesse; avec une idée de l’ancienne géographie & des systèmes du monde, Paris, Tilliard.
- Histoire de la philosophie hermétique. Accompagnée d’un catalogue raisonné des écrivains de cette science, Hildesheim; New York, G. Olms, 1975.

== Sources ==
- Jean-Bernard Michault, Mémoires pour servir à l’histoire de la vie & des ouvrages de Monsieur l’abbé Lenglet du Fresnoy, Londres et se trouvent à Paris, chez Duchesne, (1761).
- Pierre-Yves Beaurepaire: La France des Lumières 1715–1789. Histoire de France. Belin, (2011), ISBN 978-2-7011-3365-2 S. 657
- Jean-Bernard Michault: Mémoires pour servir à l’histoire de la vie & des ouvrages de Monsieur l’abbé Lenglet du Fresnoy. Duchesne, Londres et se trouvent à Paris, (1761)
- Lester Abraham Segal: Nicolas Lenglet du Fresnoy (1674–1755): a study of historical criticism and methodology in early eighteenth-century France. Columbia University, (1968)
