= Na Gathan =

Scottish Gaelic rock band

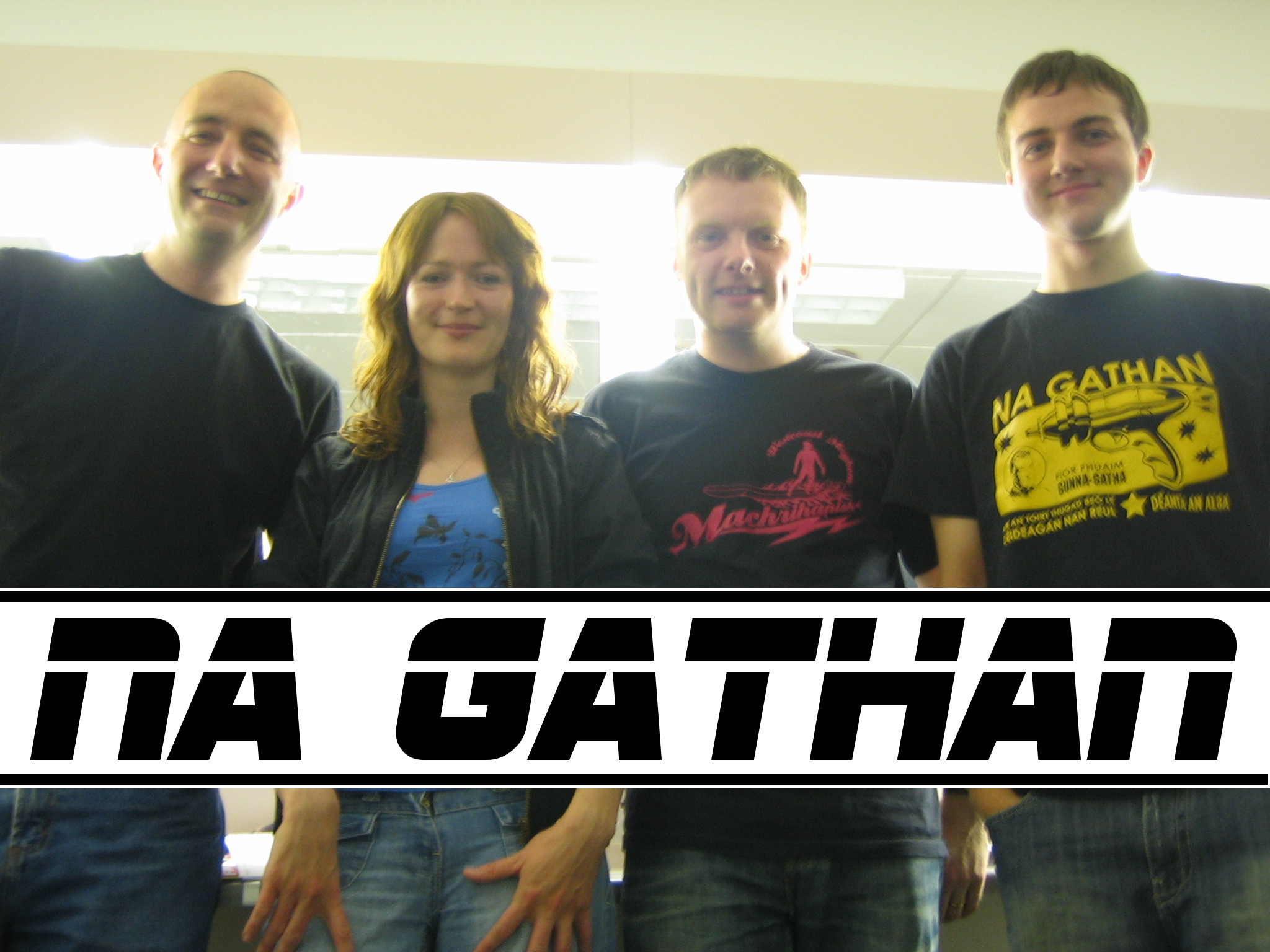
- pictured: Tim Armstrong, Kathryn NicAoidh, Greg MacThòmais, Tomaidh MacAilpein

Background information
- Origin: Isle of Skye, Scotland, United Kingdom
- Genres: Indie rock, Scottish Gaelic punk, garage punk
- Years active: 2007-present
- Labels: Ùr-sgeul; Problem? Records
- Members: Tim Armstrong; Kathryn NicAoidh; Sìleas Landgraf; Greg MacThòmais
- Past members: Tomaidh MacAilpein; Roddy Neithercut

Na Gathan is a Scottish Gaelic Indie rock band from the Isle of Skye.

== History ==
Na Gathan were formed in 2007 and first came to national attention in Scotland when they appeared in a piece on the Rapal music programme on BBC2 that documented their involvement in organizing the Celtic Connections unofficial fringe held in Glasgow early in 2008. In the spring of 2008, the band won the Best New Gaelic Song contest held by BBC Radio nan Gàidheal, with their song "Ruigidh Sinn Màrs", and in the autumn of 2008, the band again appeared on Rapal, this time as the featured band, performing four songs in front of a studio audience. In 2009, the band's second single, "Claigeann Damien Hirst," was shortlisted in the Nòs-ùr competition for a new song in a Celtic language or Scots. The song was inspired by the short story, An Claigeann aig Damien Hirst, written by Maoilios Caimbeul and published by CLÀR as part of the Ùr-sgeul new Gaelic fiction series. The story was in turn a response to the work of art by Damien Hirst, For the Love of God.

== Membership ==
The band was formed by Kathryn NicAoidh (drums), Tomaidh MacAilpein (bass), Greg MacThòmais (guitar) and Tim Armstrong (voice and keyboard). This Tim Armstrong is a different person from the Tim Armstrong from the punk band, Rancid. This Tim Armstrong founded the Gaelic punk band, Mill a h-Uile Rud. In 2008, Roddy Neithercut joined the band on keyboards. Neithercut is also the lead singer in the Scottish thrash band, Atomgevitter. In 2009, MacAilpein left the band, and Greg took over on bass while Sìleas Landgraf joined the band on guitar. All the members are fluent Gaelic speakers. Kathryn is from Skye, Greg from Glasgow, Sìleas from Köln, Germany and Tim from Seattle. Roddy Neithercut left in 2011 to become a teacher of Gaelic.

== Discography ==
- 2008 "Ruigidh Sinn Màrs agus Trì Sgeulachdan (Ùr-sgeul)
- 2009 "Claigeann Damien Hirst" (Ùr-sgeul)
- 2009 "Ga Bruidhinn Làn-Ùine" (Problem? Records)
- 2010 "Fali Ro Fali Re" (Problem? Records)
