= Gàidhlig na Lasair =

Compilation album by Oi Polloi, Mill a h-Uile Rud, Atomgevitter & Nad Aislingean
- Released: 2006
- Genres: Alternative rock & Punk
- Length: 41.18 Minutes
- Label: Problem Records

Oi Polloi, Mill a h-Uile Rud, Atomgevitter & Nad Aislingean chronology
Ceòl Gàidhlig mar Sgian nad Amhaich	Gàidhlig na Lasair

Gàidhlig na Lasair is an alternative rock and punk compilation album, by the bands Oi Polloi, Mill a h-Uile Rud, Atomgevitter, Nad Aislingean and The Thing Upstairs. It was released in 2006 by Problem Records. The album is particularly significant as all of the songs are in Scottish Gaelic, representing musical styles as broad as thrashcore and hip-hop, the first such album of its kind.

== Track listing ==
1. "Carson?" by Oi Polloi
2. "'S e Muncaidh a th' annam" by Atomgevitter
3. "Òran Sabaid Sabhal Mòr Ostaig" by Mill a h-Uile Rud
4. "Pòg a-Rithist Mi" by Nad Aislingean
5. "Ramalair Rùisgte" by Oi Polloi
6. "Aye Robot" by Atomgevitter
7. "Steòrnabhagh" by Mill a h-Uile Rud
8. "Saòrsa Do Vanunu" by Oi Polloi
9. "Coin Hirt" by Atomgevitter
10. "Crath D' Thòn" by Mill a h-Uile Rud
11. "Lasair san Adhar" by Nad Aislingean
12. "Deiseil 's Deònach" by Oi Polloi
13. "Dè a-Nis" by Atomgevitter
14. "Nan Soluis Dhubh" by The Thing Upstairs
15. "SS Politician" by Oi Polloi
