= An Luingeas Dorcha air Fàire =

- Author: Tim Armstrong
- Cover artist: Phineas X. Jones; Freight Design
- Language: Scottish Gaelic
- Genre: Science Fiction
- Publisher: CLÀR
- Publication date: 2026
- Publication place: Scotland
- Media type: Print Paperback
- Pages: 616 pp
- ISBN: 978-1919220406
- Preceded by: Air Cuan Dubh Drilseach

An Luingeas Dorcha air Fàire is a science fiction novel written in Scottish Gaelic by Tim Armstrong and published by CLÀR in 2026. An Luingeas Dorcha air Fàire is a sequel to Armstrong's 2013 novel, Air Cuan Dubh Drilseach. The first five chapters of the book were originally serialized in the Scottish Gaelic literary journal, STEALL. In draft, An Luingeas Dorcha air Fàire won Best Unpublished Manuscript for Adults at the Gaelic Literature Awards in 2025.
