= Air Cuan Dubh Drilseach =

2013 novel by Tim Armstrong

- Author: Tim Armstrong
- Cover artist: Heather Brennan; Freight Design
- Language: Scottish Gaelic
- Genre: Science Fiction
- Publisher: CLÀR
- Publication date: 2013
- Publication place: Scotland
- Media type: Print Paperback
- Pages: 223 pp
- ISBN: 978-1-900901-74-1
- Followed by: An Luingeas Dorcha air Fàire

Air Cuan Dubh Drilseach is a science fiction novel written in Scottish Gaelic by Tim Armstrong and published by CLÀR in 2013. Air Cuan Dubh Drilseach is the first hard science-fiction novel in Gaelic written for adults. The story combines elements of space opera, dark cyberpunk, romance and rock-band road-trip adventure. The central conceit of the novel is that in space, everyone speaks Gaelic, allowing the author to create an entirely Gaelic-speaking world for the characters.

== Launch ==
Air Cuan Dubh Drilseach was launched at a series of events in three separate locations: at the Aye Write book festival in Glasgow with Aonghas 'Dubh' MacNeacail presiding; at two punk rock gigs on the same day in Edinburgh; and at Sabhal Mòr Ostaig on the Isle of Skye at an event also marking the launch of Meg Bateman's new book of poetry, Transparencies. The book was launched in Edinburgh through a collaboration between CLÀR and anarcho-punk band Oi Polloi at two all-Scottish-Gaelic gig events on Saturday 27 April 2013, at Elvis Shakespeare on Leith Walk and on The Cruz Boat at the Shore in Leith. The (now legendary amongst the Leith community) Leith Walk gig took place while Hibernian F.C. played out a 3–3 draw against St. Mirren F.C., inadvertently diverting police resources at a crucial time and allowing the anarcho-punk, Oi!, punk rock, street celebration to continue uninhibited, proving a significant landmark in Gaelic culture.

== Reception ==
The reaction to the novel has been largely positive. Literary theorist Nathaniel Harrington wrote, "Air Cuan Dubh Drilseach is one of the most radical experiments in modern Gaelic literature [...] a text that is — despite the existence of both earlier and later Gaelic science fiction — still essentially unique in the field of Gaelic literature." Aonghas 'Dubh' MacNeacail has described the novel as a "great step forward on many levels" for Gaelic fiction and Ruairidh MacIlleathain described the novel as a strong story and "a milestone in Gaelic literature". Moray Watson, reviewing in Northwords Now, while critical of some aspects of the plot, was generally positive, calling it an "impressive debut", and Raghnall MacIlleDhuibh (Ronald Black), reviewing in the Scotsman newspaper, wrote that he would include Air Cuan Dubh Drilseach "among the best half-dozen Gaelic novels ever published." In 2016, Air Cuan Dubh Drilseach was selected by Scot Lit Fest as one of the five most important Gaelic novels of all time.

== Saltire Society Literary Awards 2013 ==
In October 2013, Air Cuan Dubh Drilseach was shortlisted for the Saltire Society 2013 First Book of the Year Award, along with work from Malcolm MacKay (Mantle), Eunice Buchanan (Kettillonia), Vicky Jarrett (Linen Press) and Kellan MacInnes (Luath Press). Air Cuan Dubh Drilseach went on to win the award, along with As Far as I Can See by Eunice Buchanan.

== Translation ==
An Irish-language translation was published by Leabhar Breac in 2020. Tinte na Farraige Duibhe was translated by Eoin P. Ó Murchú.
