= Iain Finlay Macleod =

Scottish writer

Iain Finlay Macleod (born 1973) is a Scottish writer from Adabrock, Ness, Isle of Lewis. He lives on the Isle of Skye.

Macleod's first full-length play was called "Homers" and was produced by the Traverse Theatre, Edinburgh in 2002, directed by Philip Howard. Macleod then went on to work regularly with the Traverse theatre on plays such as "I was a Beautiful Day" and "The Pearlfisher". It was revived at the Finborough Theatre, London, in July 2009 in a production which subsequently played at the Tron, Glasgow.

In 2008 MacLeod collaborated with composer Gerard McBurney, director Kath Burlinson and choreographer Struan Leslie on an adaptation of The Silver Bough by F. Marian MacNeill. The resultant work was produced by British Youth Music Theatre at the Aberdeen International Youth Festival.

Other theatre work includes St Kilda - A European Opera". This was a multi-discipline theatre piece which was shown simultaneously in five countries (Scotland, France, Belgium, Germany, Austria). It was shown at the Edinburgh International Festival 2009. Macleod's "The Summer Walking" was BBC Radio 4's Afternoon Play on 12 August 2009.

Macleod is also a writer of fiction and is the author of several novels for the Ùr-sgeul project, published by CLÀR.
