= Copaganda =

Promotion of police for their benefit

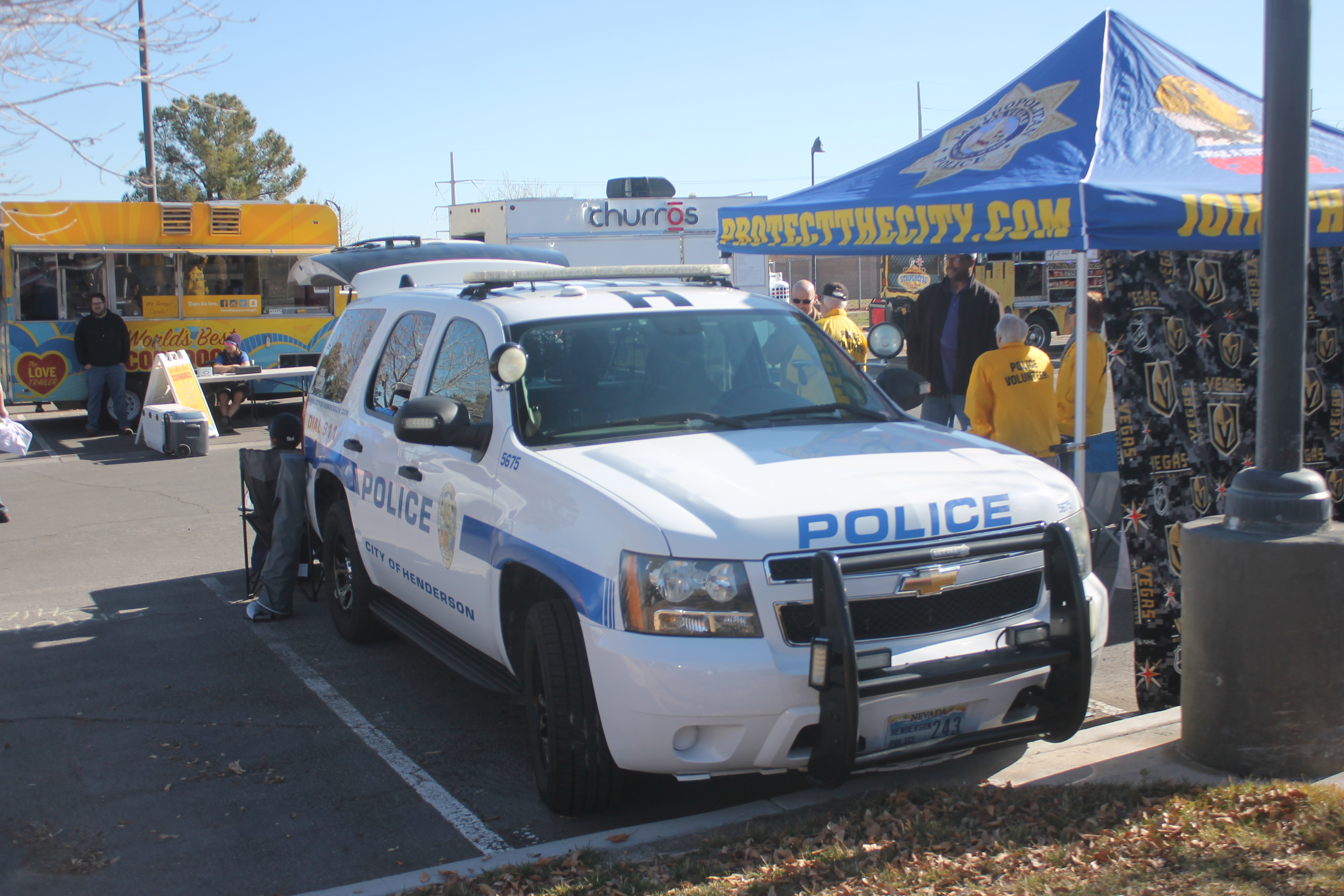
A Henderson Police Department cruiser next to a police promotional tent at the 2020 Nevada Law Enforcement Appreciation Day event

Copaganda (a portmanteau of cop and propaganda) is propaganda intended to positively shape public opinion about police or counter criticism of police and anti-police sentiment.

The term is used to criticize news media creating one-sided depictions of police, uncritically repeating police narratives, or minimizing police misconduct. It has also been applied to human interest stories and viral videos of police performing wholesome activities in their communities.

Fictional depictions of police, especially in police procedurals and legal dramas, have been criticized for portraying police as infallible heroes and reinforcing misconceptions about crime rates, minority groups, and police misconduct.

== History ==
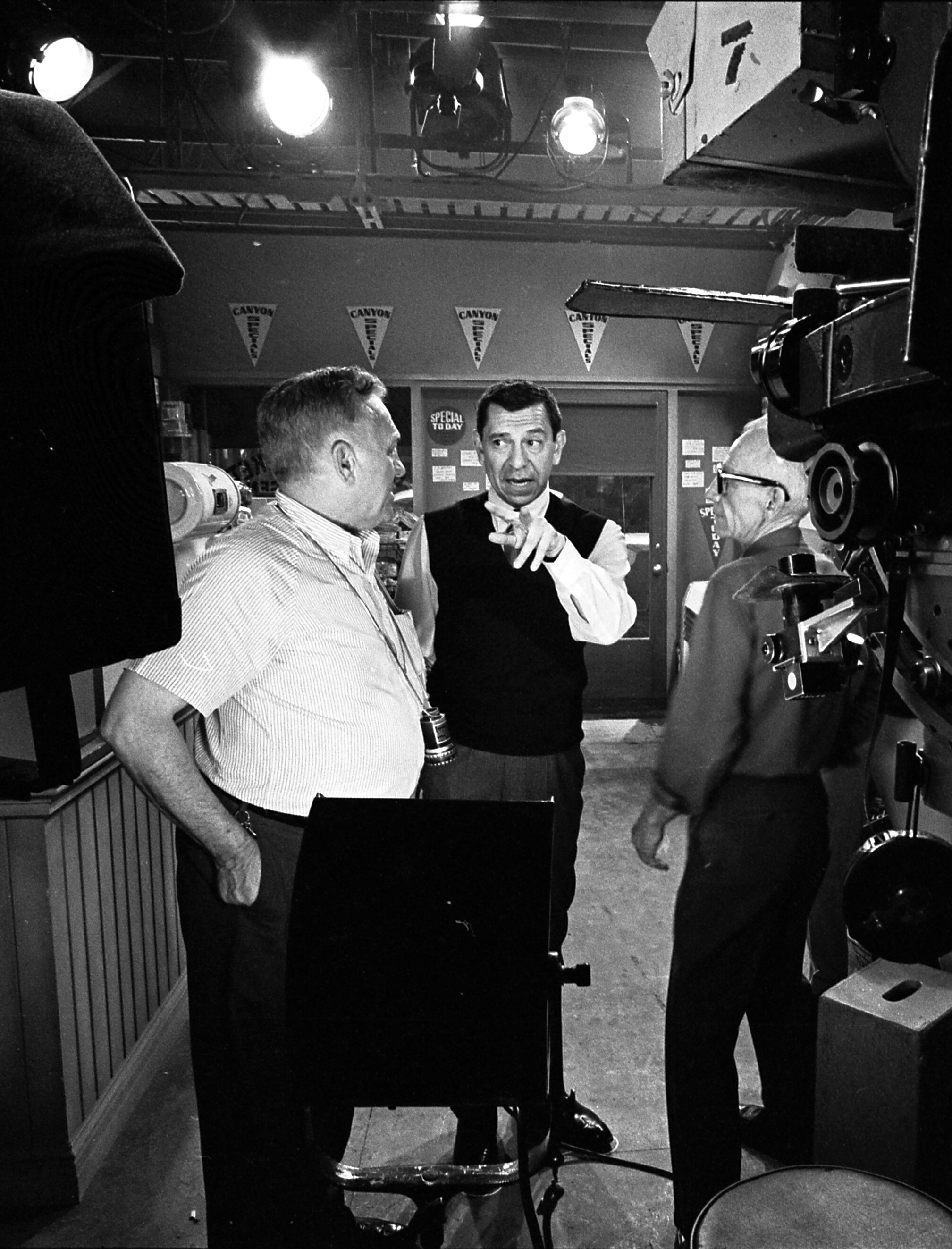
Jack Webb (center, pointing) on the set of Dragnet, 1966. Many of Webb's works, including Dragnet, were endorsed and supported by the Los Angeles Police Department and held a positive view towards law enforcement and authority, constituting an early form of copaganda.

Brenden Gallagher for The Daily Dot cites "saving kittens" stories and "Christmas gift surprise" stunts as "age-old versions of what we’re seeing today" and continues by stating that "Copaganda is so old, you can find it in Nick at Night reruns. The media has been regurgitating police PR since the days of Andy Griffith, and now in the era of Brooklyn 99, it is just being used more often and more effectively."

Aaron Rahsaan Thomas comments on the history of copaganda in American television: "The past 60 years have seen shows like Dragnet (1951–1959), The Untouchables (1959–1963), and Adam 12 (1968–1975) establish a formula where, within an hour of story, good law men, also known as square-jawed white cops, defeat bad guys, often known as poor people of color." Subsequent shows such as Hawaii Five-O (1968–1980) and Kojak (1973–1978) solidified this narrative, along with Hill Street Blues (1981–1987), Miami Vice (1984–1989), and Cagney & Lacey (1982–1989), which were "for the most part, told from the point of view of white cops occasionally interacting with people of color who were, at best, one-dimensional criminals, colleagues, bosses, sidekicks, and best friends. Even when blackness was not equated with criminality, it was often supplemented by an inhuman lack of depth or presence."

In 1979, historian E.P. Thompson drew attention to the phenomenon’s British manifestations. He observed a tendency towards the 'populist celebration of the servants of the state' exemplified on British television by the "homely neighbour and universal uncle, Dixon of Dock Green".

In 2020, following the police murder of George Floyd and the resulting protests, audiences in the US and elsewhere demanded increased attention to how police were portrayed in crime shows and other media. This resulted in the cancellation of some programs such as the reality TV show Cops and A&E's Live PD. Activists criticized videos of police officers kneeling with protestors as shallow gestures or performative displays of solidarity, and some protestors claimed on social media that they were later attacked by the same police. The media's focus on looting during the protests has also been described as copaganda.

== Purpose ==
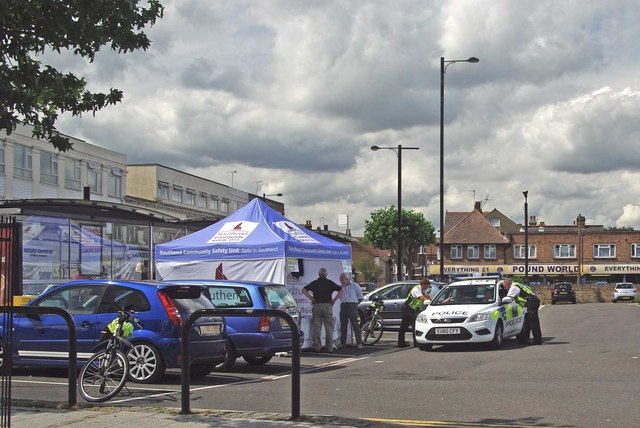
A community policing event in Southend-on-Sea, England

The purpose of copaganda is to sway public opinion for the benefit of law enforcement and redirect attention away from news which may generate a negative image of law enforcement. In an article for The New York Times on a viral video of a Norfolk Police Department lip-sync battle, reporter Laura Holson describes this as one example in a larger trend of "videos of officers performing [which] have gone viral across the country, as departments step up outreach efforts and seek to improve their image" and characterized it as a "public relations dance". Corporal William Pickering, a public information officer with the Norfolk Police Department, which created the "Uptown Funk" video stated "it is allowing the country to see us in another way."

Brenden Gallagher describes that the purpose of copaganda is to win a public relations battle: "If a disproportionate number of articles about the police engaging in 'random' acts of kindness pop up in your feed, while stories about police corruption or abuse are suppressed or go uncovered completely, the public perception of the police eventually looks far different than the reality." According to an academic study on "Media Power & Information Control: A Study of Police Organizations & Media Relations" for the National Institute of Justice:

Most citizens have little contact with law enforcement officers and their opinion of the police is often formed by the mass media's portrayal of our functions. The maintenance of good press relations is therefore a crucial element of public relations. Officers and employees must maintain good rapport with the media and deal with them in a courteous and impartial manner. It must be remembered that the media has a legitimate function in our society and the public trust of the police can be enhanced through proper dealings with the media (#1098-5). The mission ... is (1) to coordinate the release of accurate and timely information to the news media and the public and (2) to promote the positive image of [the Department].

The goals of [the Department] are to maintain public support ... by keeping the avenues of communication among the department, news media and citizenry open. The objectives ... are to utilize the media when attempting to stimulate public interest in departmental programs involving the community [and to] promote a feeling of teamwork between the police and media (#3800). [Officers shall] assume a pro-active approach in contacting the news media with information about the Department that might not otherwise come to their attention, but is newsworthy (#302.3).

Copaganda media has been shown in a study to reinforce racist misconceptions.

== Examples ==
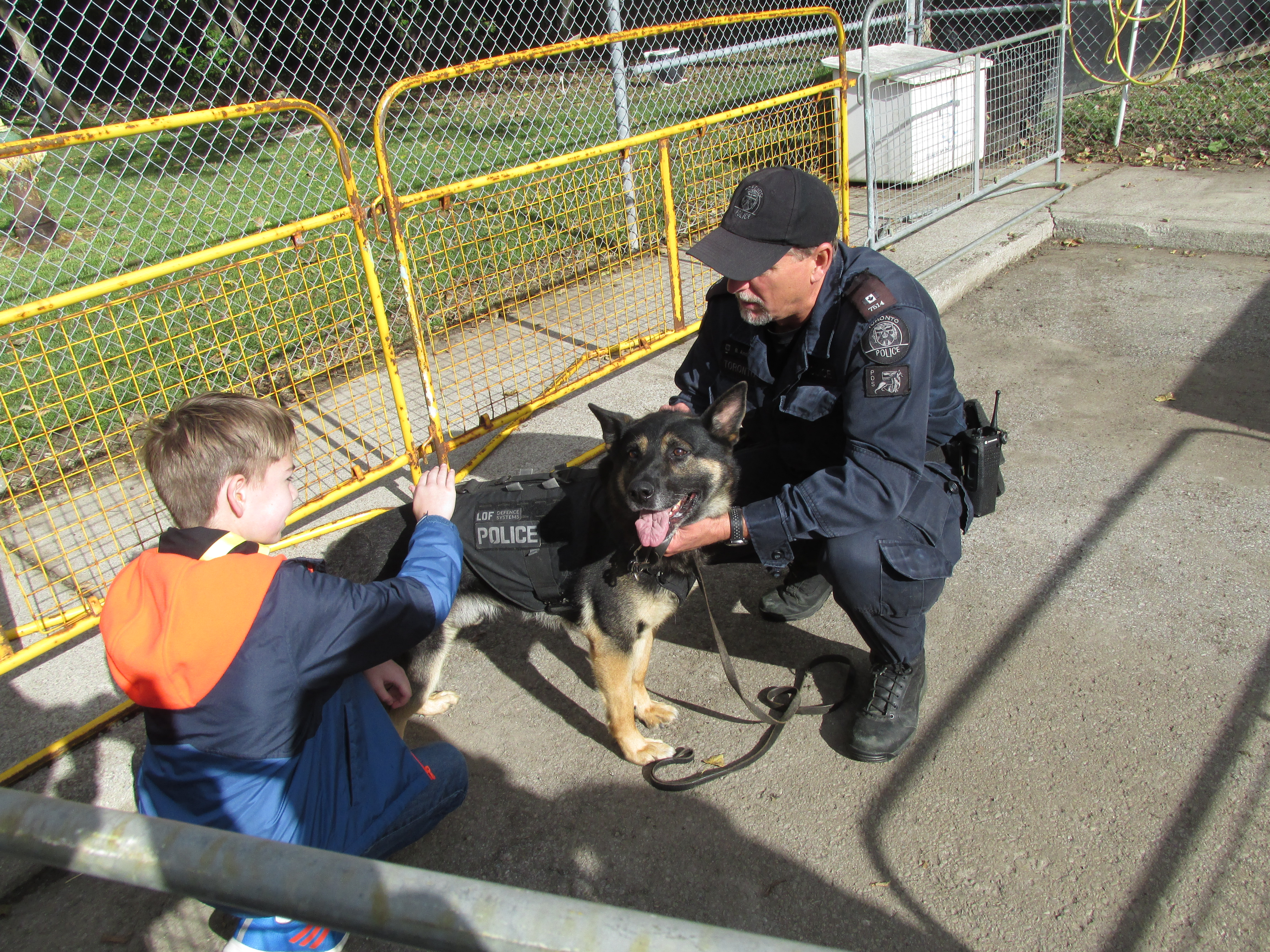
A child petting a police dog at a Toronto Police Service open house event in 2019

News media are the most common outlets for copaganda, often taking the form of news stories about police officers performing simple tasks that can be construed as laudable by viewers. Amidst the Ferguson unrest in 2014, a widely circulated news story and photographs of 12-year-old Devonte Hart hugging Portland Police Sergeant Bret Barnum, has been identified by critics as a prominent example of copaganda. CBS News picked up the story in an article entitled "Amid Ferguson tension, emotional hug goes viral", with its opening line: "It's being called the hug felt 'round the world."

In 2018, police lip-sync challenges received popular coverage in news media. USA Today called it "the hit social media trend of the summer" and created a bracket for police departments to submit videos of officers lip syncing to be voted on. The article stated that "nearly each of the lip sync videos that hits social media goes viral making everyone (viewer and video-maker alike) a winner."

The National Law Enforcement Museum was described as "straight-up copaganda" in a review of the institution for The Washington Post, stating that it "leans more toward propaganda than education".

News reporting often discusses police shootings in the passive voice, sometimes using the phrase "officer-involved shooting", which has been described as a euphemism or a form of copaganda. Such language obscures the role the police played in the interaction being described. In the case of "officer-involved shooting", it obscures how the officer was involved in the shooting. This practice (also called the "past exonerative" tense) is discouraged by NPR and disallowed by the AP Stylebook in 2017.

According to some (such as Scott Hechinger), news media tends to report police narratives as fact without verifying them, which can lead to journalists spreading false narratives or describing them in a way that is misleading or sensationalist. For example, some police departments reported a "spike" in homicides in 2020, and news outlets reported on this without adding the context that the number of homicides was still on a downward trend, significantly lower than it was in the 1980s and 1990s.

In February 2023, the city of Toronto spent hundreds of thousands of dollars on a podcast to present a "behind the scenes" view of policing in the city. They engaged a third-party producer to avoid the perception that the program was "copaganda", although the agency retained final say on the content of the podcast. Reports or media produced by police agencies in Edmonton, Ottawa, Vancouver, and in relation to the 2022 convoy protests have also been described as copaganda.

=== Copaganda in television ===
Marga Buenaventura writing for CNN Philippines described the television series Ang Probinsyano as copaganda, drawing unfavorable comparisons between the series' favorable depiction of law enforcement and the various controversies involving the Philippine National Police such as corruption—particularly the padrino system—and various incidents of police brutality in the country.

Reality shows that present police perspectives with a "bad guy" versus "good guy" narrative such as Cops and Live PD have been identified as a form of copaganda that minimizes the victim's side of the story. Such criticism led to the cancellation of Cops along with similar shows.

TV franchises such as Law & Order, NCIS and FBI and shows such as Scandal, Major Crimes, Chicago PD, Blue Bloods, Hawaii Five-0, Criminal Minds, Magnum, P.I., S.W.A.T., The Rookie, and Rookie Blue have been described as "copagandic narratives", "outright applaud[ing] police" or "mindless glorification". Dick Wolf, the producer of the Law & Order franchise, described himself as "unabashedly pro law enforcement". In the wake of the protests, calls to cancel copaganda television shows entered the mainstream discourse.

In the wake of the George Floyd protests, the Canadian animated children's series Paw Patrol was criticized for presenting a "good-cop archetype" after a post appeared on the show's Twitter account announcing that they would go dark in memory of Floyd and received negative backlash. In July 2020, then-White House Press Secretary Kayleigh McEnany claimed the show was canceled due to "cancel culture" but the show denied any such termination.

== See also ==
- Community policing
- CIA influence on public opinion § Work with entertainment
- Civil-police relations
- Officer Friendly
- Black Lives Matter
- Blue Lives Matter
- Blue wall of silence
- Thin blue line
- Embedded journalism
- Propaganda § Wartime
- List of police television dramas
