= Ùr-sgeul =

Publisher of new Scottish Gaelic prose

- Type: General partnership
- Industry: Books, Publishing
- Founded: 2003
- Headquarters: Glasgow, Scotland, United Kingdom
- Area served: Worldwide
- Products: Books, CDs

Ùr-sgeul was an independent publisher of new Scottish Gaelic prose. The name Ùr-sgeul is a Gaelic word which translates variously as: a romance, a novel or a recent tale. Professor Alan Riach, in Scottish Literature: An introduction, summarises the Ùr-Sgeul publishing initiative as "devoted to prose fiction and developing an increasingly impressive list of new titles: short stories and anthologies but mainly single-author novels."

== History ==
Ùr-sgeul was founded in 2003 as a project to promote new Gaelic fiction, and finished in 2013. The project, taken forward by CLÀR, was conceived under the auspices of the Gaelic Books Council and with a start-up grant of £50K from the Scottish Arts Council. In its short history, Ùr-sgeul has been prolific, and has contributed significantly to the recent resurgence of the Gaelic novel. Ùr-sgeul is particularly notable for advancing modern genres and themes in Scottish Gaelic literature, and for the modern look and feel of the design of the novels.

Ùr-sgeul's most critically successful title to date was the epic novel, An Oidhche Mus Do Sheòl Sinn, by Aonghas Pàdraig Caimbeul. Heavily influenced in both structure and theme by the works of Leo Tolstoy, An Oidhche Mus Do Sheòl Sinn was short-listed for the Saltire Book of the Year Award in 2004. Since then, Aonghas Pàdraig Caimbeul has produced three further novels for Ùr-sgeul, and a novella for CLÀR.

In 2008, Ùr-sgeul was featured on the half-hour Gaelic arts program on BBC2, Ealtainn. In 2008, Ùr-sgeul also branched into avant-garde music publishing and released a CD mixing Gaelic prose and modern Gaelic music by the rock band, Na Gathan. That same year, Ùr-sgeul approached Bòrd na Gàidhlig for support to expand its activities, including provision of a full-time editor. The approach was not supported.

In 2009, Ùr-Sgeul published the first ever German-Gaelic fiction publication Der Schadel von Damien Hirst, edited by Michael Klevenhaus, launched at the FilmAlba festival in Bonn, Germany.

Finlay MacLeod was presented with the first ever annual Donald Meek Literary Award in 2010, at a ceremony at the Edinburgh International Book Festival for his Ùr-Sgeul title, Gormshuil an Righ, his first ever Gaelic novel for adults.

In 2011, the novella Cuid a' Chorra-Ghrithich by Alasdair Caimbeul was published. A Gaelic commentator provided a throw-away comment in The Scotsman newspaper: "Tha Alasdair a’ Bhocsair a’ creidsinn ann an daoine ’s ann an Leódhas ’s ann an Gàidhlig agus sin, a réir choltais, è.". "Alasdair Caimbeul believes in people, in Lewis, and in Gaelic, and this, it seems, is it."

Saorsa, an example of the modern book-design of the Ùr-sgeul imprint.

Moral dilemmas, subversion and law breaking constituted the broad themes explored in the 2011 collection, Saorsa (Freedom). 13 new short stories from 13 writers were published, as follows:

- Luathas-teichidh by Tim Armstrong
- Dh'fhalbh sin, 's thàinig seo by Maureen NicLeòid
- Dorsan by Annie NicLeòid Hill
- An Fhianais by Màiri Anna NicDhòmhnaill
- An Comann by Seonaidh Adams
- Saorsa gun chrìch by Mìcheal Klevenhaus
- An Drochaid by Mona Claudia Wagner
- Sandra agus Ceit by Seònaid NicDhòmhnaill
- Playa de la Suerte by Gillebrìde Mac 'IlleMhaoil
- Iain MacAonghais by Neil McRae
- Euceartas Ait by Cairistìona Stone
- An Dotair Eile by Pàdraig MacAoidh
- Chanadh gun do chuir i às dha by Meg Bateman

Aonghas MacNeacail wrote the introduction for Saorsa.

The Ùr-Sgeul website www.ur-sgeul.com, the German-Gaelic collaboration www.ur-sgeul.de and the digital pages www.ur-sgeul.com/digital/ - featuring audio, video and written materials for learners and native speakers - were axed in July 2011 following a decision by the Gaelic Books Council.

In 2014, The Irish Times explored the contribution of Ùr-Sgeul to the revitalization of Gaelic fiction.

In 2020, editor and journalist Alasdair H. Campbell described the marketing methods employed by Ùr-sgeul as "innovative and creative, successfully raising the profile of Scottish Gaelic fiction amongst the wider Scottish population."

== Books ==
- Saorsa short story collection edited by Joan NicDhòmhnaill and John Storey, 2011
- Air a Thoir by Martainn Mac an t-Saoir, 2011
- Cuid a' Chorra-Ghrithich by Alasdair Caimbeul (Alasdair a' Bhocsair), 2011
- Suthainn Sìor by Norma NicLeòid, 2011
- An Druim Bho Thuath by Tormod Caimbeul, 2011
- Impireachd by Iain F. MacLeoid, 2010
- Teas by Maoilios Caimbeul, 2010
- Gormshuil an Rìgh by Fionnlagh MacLeòid, 2010
- A' Ghlainne agus Sgeulachdan Eile by Mairi E. NicLeòid, 2010
- Der Schadel von Damien Hirst edited by Michael Klevenhaus and Joan NicDhòmhnaill, 2009
- Cainnt na Caileige Caillte by Alison Lang, 2009
- Tilleadh Dhachaigh by Aonghas Pàdraig Caimbeul, 2009
- Samhraidhean Dìomhair by Catrìona Lexy Chaimbeul, 2009
- An Claigeann aig Damien Hirst Vol 3 (paper) - Stories 15–21, 2008
- An Claigeann aig Damien Hirst Vol 2 (paper) - Stories 8–14, 2008
- An Claigeann aig Damien Hirst Vol 1 (paper) - Stories 1–7, 2008
- Taingeil Toilichte by Norma NicLeòid, 2008
- Am Bounty by Iain F. MacLeòid, 2008
- An Latha as Fhaide by Màrtainn Mac an t-Saoir, 2008
- Dìomhanas by Fionnlagh MacLeòid, 2008
- Cleas Sgathain by Mairi Anna NicDhomhnaill, 2008
- Slaightearan by Tormod MacGill-Eain, 2008
- An Taigh-Samhraidh by Aonghas Pàdraig Caimbeul, 2007
- Malairt Sgeil by Donnchadh MacGillIosa agus Màrtainn Mac an t-Saoir, 2007
- Shrapnel by Tormod Caimbeul – Tormod a’ Bhocsair, 2006
- Ùpraid by Éilís Ní Dhuibhne (translation from Irish), 2006
- Dìleas Donn by Norma NicLeòid, 2006
- Gymnippers Diciadain by Màrtainn Mac an t-Saoir, 2005
- Na Klondykers by Iain F. MacLeòid, 2005
- Am Miseanaraidh by Iain Mac a’ Ghobhainn, 2005
- Dacha Mo Ghaoil by Tormod MacGill-Eain, 2005
- Là a’ Dèanamh Sgèil Do Là by Aonghas Pàdraig Caimbeul, 2004
- Tocasaid ‘Ain Tuirc by Donnchadh MacGIlliosa, 2004
- An Oidhche Mus Do Sheòl Sinn by Aonghas Pàdraig Caimbeul, 2003
- Ath-Aithne by Màrtainn Mac an t-Saoir, 2003

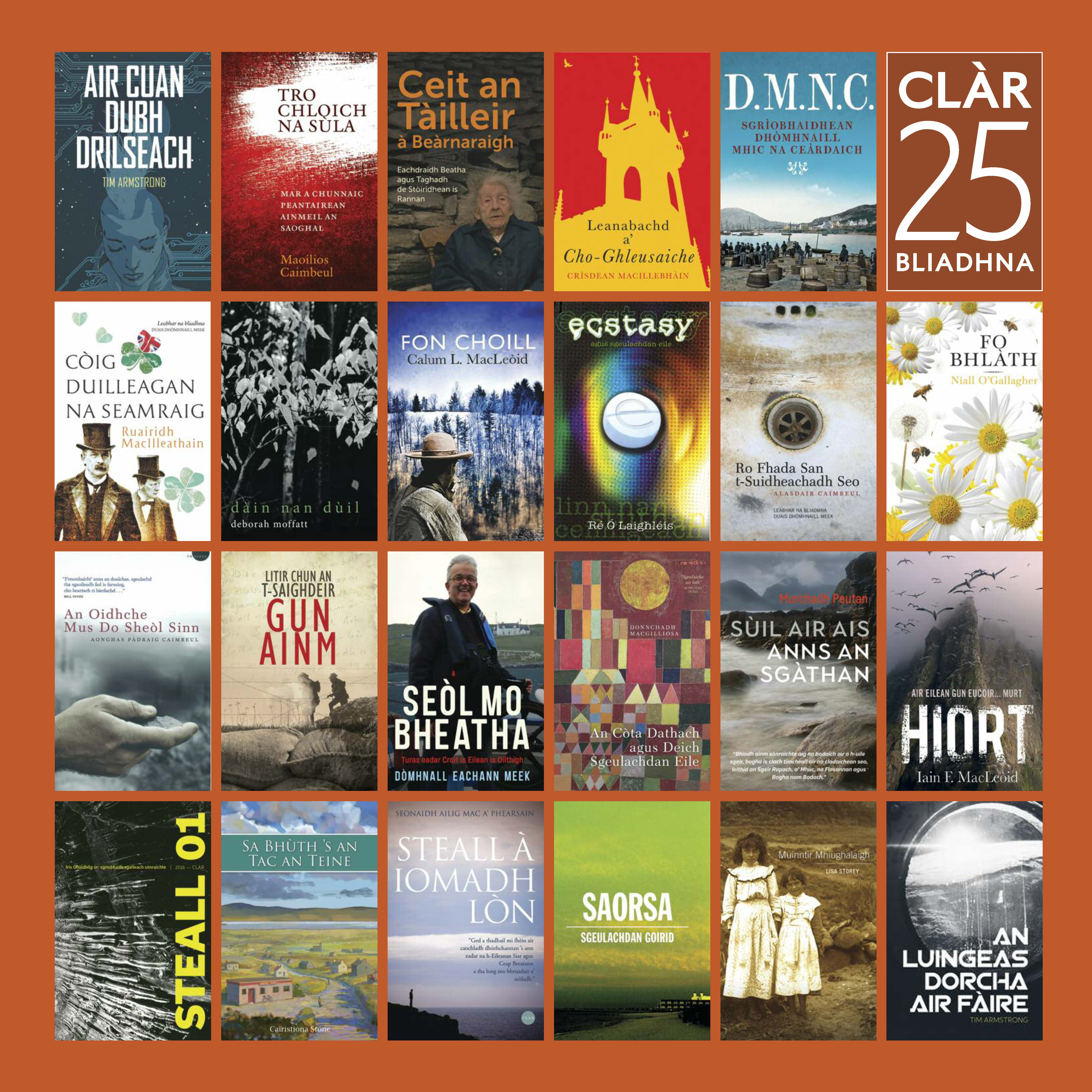
All details of Ùr-Sgeul titles are shown in the print version of publication CLÀR - Na Leabhraichean Gàidhlig - 25 bliadhna - CLÀR: 25 years of Gaelic Publishing, ISBN 978-19161458-9-4.

== Talking Books ==
- Shrapnel by Tormod Caimbeul – 4 CD set, 2007
- Gymnippers Diciadain by Màrtainn Mac an t-Saoir – DVD, 2007
- Na Klondykers by Iain F. MacLeòid – DVD, 2007
- Là a’ Dèanamh Sgèil Do Là by Aonghas Pàdraig Caimbeul – DVD, 2007
- Am Miseanaraidh by Iain Mac a’ Ghobhainn – 2-CD set, 2005
- Dacha Mo Ghaoil by Tormod MacGill-Eain – 3-CD set, 2005
- Tocasaid ‘Ain Tuirc by Donnchadh MacGIlliosa. – 3-CD set, 2005
- Ath-Aithne by Màrtainn Mac an t-Saoir – 6-CD set, 2004

== Other publications ==
- Claigeann Damien Hirst by Na Gathan - CD, 2008
- Ruigidh Sinn Mars by Na Gathan - CD, 2008
