= Good cop, bad cop =

Interrogation and negotiation tactic

Good cop, bad cop, also informally called the Mutt and Jeff technique, is a psychological tactic used in interrogation and negotiation, in which a team of two people take opposing approaches to the subject. One interrogator adopts a hostile or accusatory demeanor, emphasizing threats of punishment, while the other adopts a more sympathetic demeanor, emphasizing reward, in order to convince the subject to cooperate. It is an instance of the Reid technique.

== Technique ==
The "bad cop" takes an aggressive, negative stance towards the subject, making blatant accusations, derogatory comments, threats, and in general creating antipathy with the subject. This sets the stage for the "good cop" to act sympathetically, appearing supportive and understanding, and in general showing sympathy (or even empathy) for the subject. The good cop defends the subject from the bad cop. The subject may feel able to cooperate with the good cop, either out of trust or out of fear of the bad cop and may then seek protection by the good cop and provide the information the interrogators are seeking.

When this technique is used as a negotiation tactic outside of the interrogation context, the good cop attempts to convince the counterpart to cut a deal by implying that the bad cop will return if no agreement is reached. The order can also be reversed. In this scenario, the good cop does most of the talking, while the bad cop intervenes only to apply pressure to elicit compliance from the subject.

The disadvantage of this technique is that it can be easily identified, and the "bad cop" may alienate the subject.

== See also ==
- False confession
- Carrot and stick
- Officer Friendly, a good-cop character used to promote police to children
