= Hechinger (surname) =

Hechinger is a surname. Notable people with the surname include:

- Fred Hechinger (born 1999), American actor
- Fred M. Hechinger (1920-1995), German-born American newspaper editor
- Mike Hechinger (1890–1967), American baseball player
- Scott Hechinger, American civil rights attorney
