= Feur Buidhe an t-Samhraidh =

Feur Buidhe an t-Samhraidh

Feur Buidhe an t-Samhraidh (Yellow Summer Grass) is a young adult novel written in Scottish Gaelic by Tim Armstrong and published by Sandstone Press in 2014. The novel is set in Scotland and the United States and follows Colman and Seonag, two young Scottish musicians who slip into a dangerous underworld of crime and violence when they become lost and separated from their band's US tour. This is Armstrong's second novel in Gaelic, following Air Cuan Dubh Drilseach, and it received mostly positive reviews. Writing in Dàna Magazine, Liam Alastair Crouse called the novel “exciting and enticing”, although he felt the author left some questions unanswered in the ending. While Ronald Black, writing in The Scotsman newspaper, noted that he particularly enjoyed the ending.
