= CLÀR =

- Company type: General partnership
- Industry: Books, Publishing
- Founded: 1996
- Headquarters: Inverness, Scotland, United Kingdom
- Area served: Worldwide
- Products: Books, CDs
- Website: https://clar.online

CLÀR is a Scottish Gaelic publisher. Established in 1996, the company is run on a voluntary, independent basis and based in Inverness, Scotland. It was the publisher for the Ùr-sgeul project, specialising in new Gaelic fiction.

== Publishing policy ==
Tha company concentrates on Gaelic-only publications and rarely publishes English language or bilingual content. CLÀR has published Gaelic writers such as Timothy C. Armstrong, author of the first hard science fiction work in Scottish Gaelic for adults, Air Cuan Dubh Drilseach, as well as non-fiction from authors including John Ailig MacPherson, Donald E. Meek and Mary Smith. Poetry collections published by CLÀR include work by Niall O'Gallagher. CLÀR rarely publishes books for children.

== 1996–2021 ==
Between 1996 and 2021, CLÀR published 80 Scottish Gaelic titles involving 90 different Gaelic authors, and was involved in Gaelic-only anthologies, poetry, short stories, fiction, non-fiction, autobiography and reference works, as well as the periodical STEALL, the BBC Radio nan Gàidheal-facilitated project Letter to an Unknown Soldier (Litir Chun an t-Saighdeir Gun Ainm: 14 – 18 Now project) and the Ùr-Sgeul Gaelic fiction series. Author and Gaelic campaigner Lisa Storey was involved in CLÀR since the company's inception, but has now moved on to Clò Phabaigh.

== International ==
CLÀR has engaged in international collaboration including Ecstasy, originally written by Irish author Ré Ó Laighléis, translated by Beathag Morrison, published in 2004. Ecstasy was a winner in the CBI Book of the Year Awards (formerly Bisto Book of The Year Merit Award), the European White Ravens Literary Award, the North American NAMLLA Literary Award and the Oireachtas na Gaeilge Prize. Martin MacIntyre's collection of short stories published by CLÀR/Ùr-sgeul, Ath-Aithne, was translated into French and published by Vent D'ailleurs in 2018. More recently, Air Cuan Dubh Drilseach was translated to Irish by Eoin P. Ó Murchú and published by Leabhar Breac as Tinte na Farraige Duibhe.

== Scottish Gaelic authors ==
Scottish Gaelic authors published by CLÀR include Meg Bateman, Angus Peter Campbell, Alasdair Caimbeul, Norman Campbell, Catrìona Lexy Chaimbeul, Alison Lang, Mary Anne MacDonald, Martin MacIntyre, Peter MacKay, Tormod MacGill-Eain, Finlay MacLeod, Iain Finlay Macleod, Norma MacLeod and Des Scholes.

== Awards ==
Several original titles published by CLÀR have been short-listed or achieved success at the Saltire Society Literary Awards. In 2003, the CLÀR/Ùr-sgeul title Ath-Aithne by Martin MacIntyre won the Saltire Society First Book of the Year Award. Gormshuil an Rìgh by Dr Finlay MacLeod (An t-Oll. Fionnlagh MacLeòid) won the first Donald Meek Literary Award in 2010. In 2013, Air Cuan Dubh Drilseach by Dr. Timothy Armstrong was the winner of the Saltire Society First Book of the Year Award, while Màiri Dhall, a collection of short stories by Duncan Gillies (Donnchadh MacGillIosa) from London via Ness on the Isle of Lewis was shortlisted for the main award 2013 Book of the Year. The shortlist included Ali Smith and James Robertson. This was the first time two Scottish Gaelic fiction authors together achieved placings on the Saltire Society Awards. 2013 was also the first time a Scottish Gaelic publisher (CLÀR) received two nominations in the one year.
