= Chris Agee =

American poet, essayist, and editor

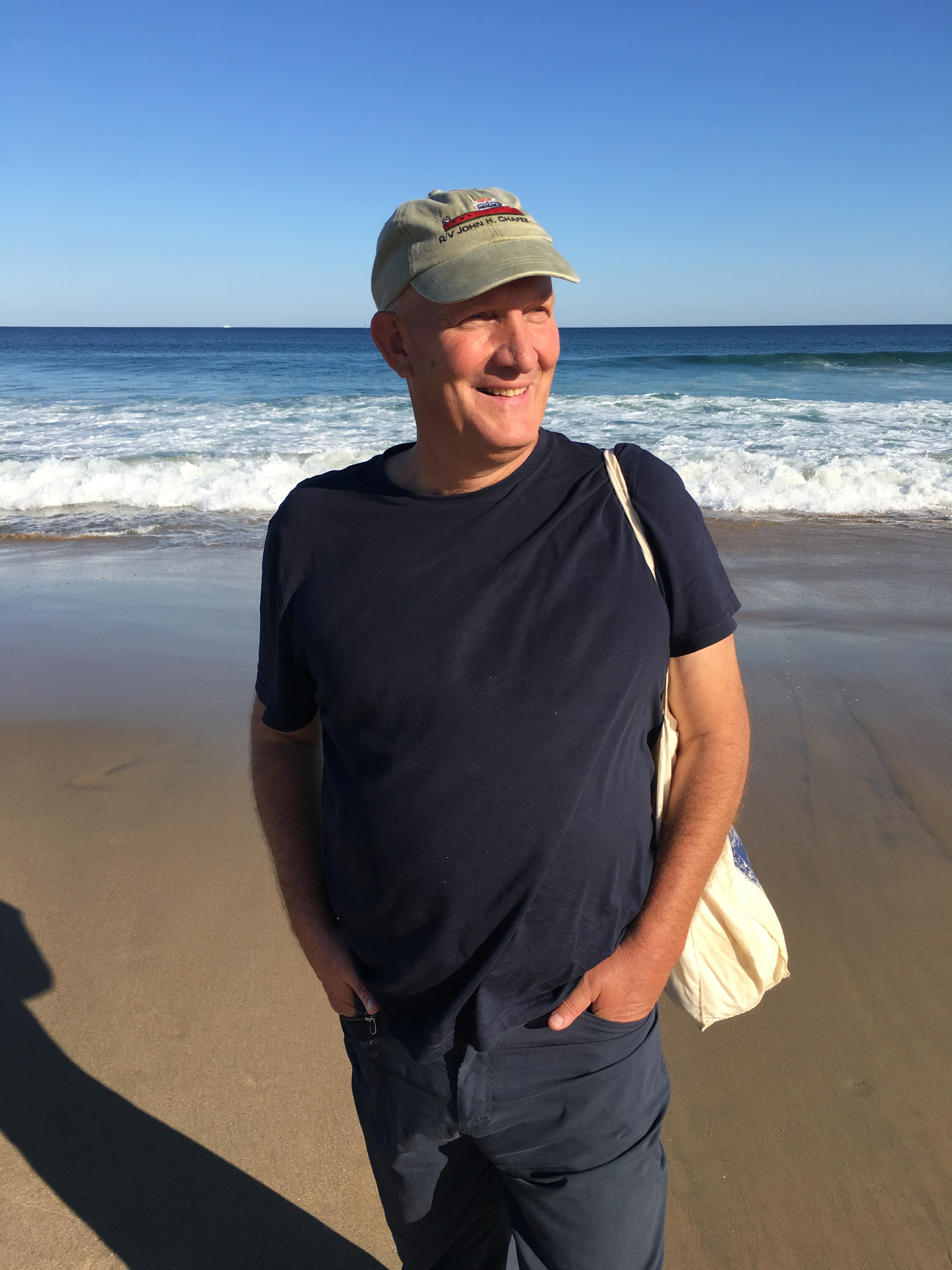
- Photograph of Chris Agee, taken by John Minihan
- Born: Christopher Robert Agee; San Francisco, California, United States
- Occupations: Poet; essayist; editor of Irish Pages

Christopher Robert Agee (born 1956) is an American poet, essayist, editor and publisher living in Northern Ireland. He is the founder and editor of Irish Pages: A Journal of Contemporary Writing and of The Irish Pages Press as well as the author of four books of poems, and one work of poetic non-fiction. He lives in Belfast Northern Ireland, and divides his time between Northern Ireland Scotland and Croatia.

== Biography ==
=== Early life ===
Chris Agee was born in San Francisco on a US Navy hospital ship and grew up in North Cambridge, Massachusetts, Bronxville, New York and Block Island, Rhode Island. His father was Robert Cecil Agee, a lawyer; and his mother Anne Marie Agee (née Stanford) was a legal secretary.

Agee has a younger sister, Elizabeth Macon Agee, who lives in Brooklyn with her two sons. His paternal uncle is William Cameron Agee, a noted art historian of early twentieth-century American modernism; and his maternal uncle was Thomas Elmer Stanford, one of the most important ethno-musicologists of twentieth-century Mexico, where he lived and worked for over 60 years.

After high school at Phillips Academy Andover and a year in Aix-en-Provence, France (Institute pour des Étudiants Étrangers, Université D’Aix-en-Provence), he attended Harvard University (BA, cum laude, English and American Literature and Language) and since graduation has lived in Ireland.

At Harvard, he did both a versification course and his undergraduate degree thesis (on W.H. Auden) with the poet and classical translator Robert Fitzgerald, who had a considerable literary influence on him. He was also highly influenced by a course taught by the Brazilian philosopher and social theorist Roberto Mangabeira Unger, which included many related conversations.

During his year in France, his friends included Montague Don (now a BBC presenter) and Ernst Brunner (now a Swedish poet and novelist); and at Harvard, Mira Nair (now a film-maker) and Julie Agoos (now a poet).

=== Life and work in Northern Ireland ===
Agee wrote his first poems in his last year at Harvard, but none of his work was published until the late 1980s in Irish periodicals.

Following In the New Hampshire Woods (1992) and First Light (2003), his third collection of poems, Next to Nothing (2008), was shortlisted in Britain for the 2009 Ted Hughes Award for New Work in Poetry (funded by the British Poet Laureate), and its sequel, Blue Sandbar Moon, appeared in 2018, followed by a new work of “poetic non-fiction”, Trump Rant (2021).

He founded Irish Pages in 2002, and (formally) The Irish Pages Press in 2018. His co-editors are currently the poet and essayist Kathleen Jamie (Scotland's “Makar”, the national poet laureate), who is Scottish Editor; and the poet and scholar Meg Bateman, who is Scottish Gaelic Editor.

In 2007, he gave up his professional career in adult education to devote himself full-time to editing Irish Pages. Previously in Belfast, he had worked as a Lecturer in Adult Literacy in a further education college (now Belfast Metropolitan); as a Tutor at The Open University (both full-time and part-time, including tutorials in HMP Maze and HMP Maghaberry); and as a Senior Lecturer employed by the University of Glamorgan to direct the Northern Irish branch of a British trade-union education programme.

== Further literary career ==
Agee edited five books and several special issues of literary magazines before his editorial work on all titles published by The Irish Pages Press.

Agee's own work is included in 12 anthologies, mainly of Irish and American poetry.

His poems, reviews and articles have appeared regularly in The Irish Times since the early 1990s.

Two of his Balkan essays, “The Stepinac File” (2000) and “A Week in Sarajevo” (1996), are widely known outside Ireland. The first, which explores the collaboration of the Catholic Church with the fascist Ustaše regime in Croatia during the Second World War, has circulated extensively on the Internet. The second, written at the end of the Bosnian war, achieved considerable civic renown when it appeared in translation in Sarajevo some months later. His essay on the Kosova War, “A Day with the VJ” (2001), also concerns the Balkans.

Several of his Irish essays – “Weather Report: Good Friday Week, 1998”, “Poteen in a Brandy-cask: The Ethical Imagination of Hubert Butler” (1998), “Heaney's Blackbird” (2007), “The New North” (2008), “The Ethnic Basis of Irish Poetry” (2010), “Troubled Belfast” (2017), “Parable of a Summer” (2018), “The Vote Was Cant” (2019) and “Sundial & Hourglass” (2021), mostly published in Irish Pages, The Yale Review or The Irish Times – are also well known in Ireland and Britain.

In 2001, Agee participated in the “Struga Poetry Evenings” in North Macedonia, Southeastern Europe’s most distinguished poetry festival, which that year awarded its “Golden Wreath” to Seamus Heaney.

In 2003, Agee was an International Writing Fellow at the William Joiner Center, University of Massachusetts, Boston. In 2007 and 2009, respectively, he was a writer-in-residence at the St James Cavalier Arts Centre in Malta, and at the Heinrich Böll Cottage, on Achill Island, Co Mayo. Between 2012 and 2015 he was the Keith Wright Literary Fellow (Writer-in-residence) at the University of Strathclyde, Glasgow, Scotland. He has done readings at many festivals and venues in Ireland, Scotland, England, Croatia, Bosnia and the United States.

== Balkan connections ==
Agee has longstanding and close connections to the Balkans, in particular Croatia and Bosnia. He spends part of each year at his house in Žrnovo, Croatia, and has visited Bosnia many times for substantial periods.

In 1996, towards the end of the four-year siege of Sarajevo, he visited the devastated city to participate in the 12th Sarajevo Winter Festival. The festival invitation was due to his writings on the Bosnian war.

During his week there, he met many leading Bosnian writers and artists, and witnessed the liberation of the city as the ultra-nationalist Serbian forces withdrew from the surrounding hills from which they besieged the city for nearly four years. Later in 1996, “A Week in Sarajevo” was published in Ireland and soon translated in Sarajevo.

Agee edited Scar on the Stone (Bloodaxe Books, 1998, Poetry Society Recommended Translation), the first English-language anthology of Bosnian literature published after the outbreak of the Bosnian war and the subsequent genocide and partition. It was compiled with the assistance of the Bosnian poets Vojka Djkić and Marko Vesović.

Scar on the Stone was funded by The Soros Foundation and brings together 19 of Bosnia's most distinguished poets, both pre-war and wartime, from the country's three main ethnic groups, as well as several prose extracts illuminating the break-up of Yugoslavia. The translators include Ted Hughes, Kathleen Jamie, Francis Jones, Ruth Padel, Charles Simic, Nuala Ní Dhomhnaill and Harry Clifton, among others. Of this volume, the American journalist Lulu Schwartz wrote: “One of the most important volumes in English brought into print as a result of the worldwide attention paid to the Bosnian war."

In 1999, Agee's family purchased the house in Žrnovo, a small village on the island of Korčula, part of the Dalmatian archipelago just north of Dubrovnik, in the far south of Croatia.

His second collection, First Light (2003), includes a suite of Balkan poems written in the mid- to late 1990s, and thus constitutes one of the very rare first-hand responses, from an English-language or Western poet, to the immediate post-war aftermath in Bosnia and Kosova.

In 2015, he edited Balkan Essays/Balkansi eseji, the sixth volume of Hubert Butler’s essays, which was published simultaneously by The Irish Pages Press and Fraktura (Croatia's leading literary publisher) in Croatian translation.

In 2019, Fraktura published a bilingual edition of Next to Nothing/Gotovo ništa, translated by Irena Žlof, in tandem with the Croatian translation of Birthday Letters by Ted Hughes.

In 2022, Fraktura chose The Irish Pages Press to distribute in Ireland and Britain three major, celebrated books of fiction translated from the Croatian, as part of a EU Creative Europe project entitled “Facing Insecurities in Contemporary Europe”.

== Personal life ==
Agee has a son, Jacob Eoin Agee, a noted translator from Croatian to English, whose translation, Invisible Woman and Other Essays by Slavenka Drakulić, was published by Fraktura in 2022.

His daughter, Miriam Aoife Agee, died suddenly aged four in 2001. Agee's two related volumes of poetry, Next to Nothing (2008) and Blue Sandbar Moon (2018), record the aftermath of this catastrophe.

== Critical responses ==
On Next to Nothing:

From the dust-jacket:

“Next to Nothing records the years following the death of beloved child in 2001. Though bereft of belief in the poetic outcome compared to the apocalypse of the loss itself (one sense of the title), the fidelity of these poems to the ‘heartscapes’ of grief constitutes, nonetheless, a work of genuine honouring – spare, delicate, and deeply moving.”

In his review of Next to Nothing in The London Magazine (March–April 2009), the English poet Hugh Dunkerley writes:

“The work has been characterized as emotionally resonant, with reviewers highlighting its exploration of the fragility and importance of the present moment, as well as its illustration of the expressive capacity of poetry.”

On Blue Sandbar Moon:

On the dust-jacket, the Irish poet Ciarán O’Rourke writes:

A decade after Next to Nothing, Blue Sandbar Moon: a micro-epic explores the emotional and spiritual landscape of a life sustained in 'the aftermath of the aftermath'. Consisting of 174 untitled, micropoems, the collection evolves with clarity to show a vision of worlds in motion – both public and private.

The work addresses themes including memory, grief, hope, and art. It combines elements of poetry and prose and is structured around a sequence of days and hours.

Of this volume, the Irish novelist David Park has also written on the dust jacket: “I think it is a monumental work ranging across both the European landscape and the deepest inner worlds.”

In his review in the Dublin Review of Books, “Parables of Intimacy”, the Irish poet and critic Benjamin Keatinge describes the unusual range of “this most transnational of poets” and concludes: “Blue Sandbar Moon is Homeric in its recognition that, from a ‘local row’, as Kavanagh's ‘Epic’ reminds us, the tides of history can be unleashed. But it is Beckettian in its struggle to give voice to loss and grief.”

In a 2020 article in The Irish Times (2 April 2021), Agee himself discusses both books in tandem, as a single ensemble, in “Sundial and Hourglass”.

== Bibliography ==
=== Poetry ===
- In the New Hampshire Woods (The Dedalus Press, 1992)
- First Light (The Dedalus Press, 2003)
- Next to Nothing (Salt Publishing, 2008, shortlisted for the Ted Hughes Award for New Work in Poetry)
- Blue Sandbar Moon (The Irish Pages Press, 2018)
- Gotovo ništa/Next to Nothing (Fraktura, Zagreb, 2019)

=== Non-fiction ===
- Trump Rant (The Irish Pages Press, 2021)

=== Selected essays ===
- “A Week in Sarajevo”, Graph (1996)
- “The Balkan Butler”, Archipelago (1999)
- “The Stepinac File”, Archipelago (2000)
- “Weather Report: Good Friday Week, 1998”, Irish Pages Vol 1, No 1 (1998)
- “Poteen in a Brandy-cask: The Ethical Imagination of Hubert Butler”, The Yale Review Vol 86, No 2 (1998)
- “A Day with the VJ”, Irish Pages, Vol 4, No 1 (2001)
- “Heaney's Blackbird”, Irish Pages Vol 3, No 1 (2007)
- “The New North”, Introduction to The New North: Contemporary Poetry from Northern Ireland, Wake Forest University Press (2008)
- “The Ethnic Basis of Irish Poetry”, Irish Pages Vol 9, No 1 (2010)
- “Troubled Belfast”, Irish Pages Vol 9, No 2 (2017)
- “Parable of a Summer”, Blue Sandbar Moon (2018)
- “The View from the Lagan: The Vote Was Cant”, Irish Pages Vol 10, No 2 (2019)
- “Sundial & Hourglass”, The Irish Times (2021)

=== As editor ===
==== Books ====
- Balkan Essays, by Hubert Butler (The Irish Pages Press, 2016)
- The Other Tongues: An Introduction to Writing in Irish, Scots Gaelic and Scots in Ulster and Scotland (The Irish Pages Press, 2013, 2016)
- The New North: Contemporary Poetry from Northern Ireland (Wake Forest University Press, 2008 and Salt Publishing, 2011)
- Unfinished Ireland: Essays on Hubert Butler (Irish Pages, 2003)
- Scar on the Stone: Contemporary Poetry from Bosnia (Bloodaxe Books, 1998, Poetry Book Society Recommended Translation)

==== Magazine ====
- Guest editor, “Special North American Issue”, Poetry Ireland (Autumn-Winter, 1994)
- Guest editor, “Special Double Issue on Contemporary Irish Poetry”, Poetry (Chicago: October–November, 1995)
- Guest Editor, “American Special Issue”, Metre (7/8)

=== Work in anthologies ===
- Various, eds., Local Wonders (The Dedalus Press, 2021)
- Alan Hayes, ed., Reading the Future: New Writing from Ireland (Arlen House, 2018)
- Neil Astley, ed., The Hundred Years' War (Bloodaxe Books, 2014)
- Janet McLean, ed., Lines of Vision: Irish Writers on Art (Thames & Hudson, 2014)
- Eva Bourke and Barbara Borbala, eds., Landing Places: Immigrant Poets in Ireland (The Dedalus Press, 2010)
- Chris Agee, ed., The New North: Contemporary Poetry from Northern Ireland (Wake Forest University Press, 2008, Salt Publishing, 2011)
- Daniel Tobin, ed., The Book of Irish American Poetry: from the Eighteenth Century to the Present (University of Notre Dame Press, 2007)
- John Brown, ed., Magnetic North: The Emerging Poets (Lagan Press, 2007)
- Frank Ormsby, ed., The Blackbird's Nest (Blackstaff Press, 2006)
- Pat Boran, ed., Wingspan: A Dedalus Sampler (The Dedalus Press, 2006)
- Patricia Craig, ed., The Ulster Anthology (The Blackstaff Press, 2006)
- Adrian Rice, ed., A Conversation Piece (The Ulster Museum, 2002)
- Frank Ormsby, ed., The Hip Flask: Short Poems from Ireland (The Blackstaff Press, 2000)
