= Irish Pages =

Literary magazine in Belfast

- Cover of Vol 5, Issue 1: Language and Languages
- Editors: Chris Agee, Kathleen Jamie, Meg Bateman
- Categories: Literary magazine
- Frequency: Biannual
- First issue: 2002
- Country: Northern Ireland, UK
- Based in: Belfast
- Language: English and Irish
- Website: http://www.irishpages.org
- ISSN: 1477-6162

Irish Pages: A Journal of Contemporary Writing is a literary magazine published in Belfast and edited by Chris Agee, Kathleen Jamie and Meg Bateman.

Since its full-scale launch in 2003, Irish Pages has established itself as the island’s premier literary journal, combining a large general readership with outstanding writing from Ireland and overseas. With a print-run now standing at 3,000, the journal is also, increasingly, read outside Ireland and Britain. Widely considered the Irish equivalent of Granta in England, or The Paris Review in the United States, it offers an unrivalled window on the literary and cultural life of the British Isles – and further afield.

Late 2018 saw the launch of the Press in the sense of an annual programme of major book-publishing, under its new bilingual imprint, The Irish Pages Press/Cló an Mhíl Bhuí. Currently, the Press is limited to poetry, essays, memoir and other forms of non-fiction (including the graphic novel form), in both English and Irish.

== About the Journal ==
Irish Pages is a Belfast journal combining Irish, European and international perspectives. It seeks to create a novel literary space in Northern Ireland adequate to the unfolding cultural potential of the new political dispensation. The magazine is cognizant of the need to reflect in its pages the various meshed levels of human relations: the regional (Ulster), the national (Britain and Ireland), the continental (the whole of Europe), and the global.

One wider background aim is to give Irish Pages a distinctly dissident edge, to inhabit “the space outside” the Pale of the Received – business-as-usual in all its (especially Western) forms: literary, intellectual, cultural, social, political. Thus, the journal has a particular (though hardly exclusive) commitment to work informed by “the ethical imagination”. Its producers believe that there is a huge thirst for that kind of writing – writing of “high artistic consciousness”, but in the thick of the world and its dilemmas – and that it is immensely important for an increasingly complex global world. It was described by its authors as the literary equivalent of an NGO audience: all those readers for whom ethical issues count.

== Issue Themes ==
- “The Anthropocene”
- “The Belfast Agreement: Twentieth Anniversary Issue"
- “Criticism”
- “Israel, Islam & the West”
- “After Heaney”
- “Heaney”
- “Inheritance”
- “Memory"
- “Self”
- “Sexuality”
- “Ireland in Crisis”
- “An tEagrán Gaeilge / The Irish Issue”
- “Language and Languages”
- “The Sea”
- “The Media”
- “The Home Place”
- “The Literary World”
- “The Earth Issue”
- “Empire”
- “The Justice Issue”
- “Belfast in Europe”
- “Scotland”

== Contributors ==
Whilst the following is not a complete list, Irish Pages has published many contributions from the likes of Chinua Achebe, Chris Agee, Jacob Agee, David Albahari, Gary Allen, Kevin Anderson, Paul Arthur, Neal Ascherson, Samer Attar, Meg Bateman, Eileen Battersby, Paul Bélanger, Chris Benfey, John Berger, Wendell Berry, Sven Birkerts, Jean Bleakney, Andrej Bogatinoski, Don Bogen, Tisja Kljaković Braić, Colm Breathnach, Pádraic Breathnach, Rachel Giese Brown, John Burnside, Frances Byrne, Paddy Bushe, Hubert Butler, Aonghas Phàdraig Caimbeul, Angus Calder, Enri Canaj, Moya Cannon, Ruth Carr, Ciaran Carson, Rhona Chaimbeul, Manus Charleton, Muireann Charleton, Dan Chiasson, Harry Clifton, Michael Coady, Sacha Baron Cohen, Evelyn Conlon, Brendan Corcoran, Neil Corcoran, Mark Cousins, Patricia Craig, Robert Crawford, Michael Cronin, Anna Crowe, Andrew Crumey, Mahmoud Darwish, Philip Davison, Michael Davitt, Gerald Dawe, John F. Deane, Greg Delanty, Anne Devlin, Brian Dickson, Michael Donhauser, Katie Donovan, Stephen Dornan, Slavenka Draculić, Hugh Dunkerley, Bob Dylan, David Edgar, Stephen Elliott, Hans Magnus Enzensberger, Alec Finlay, Leontia Flynn, John Wilson Foster, Roy Foster, Celia de Fréine, Brian Friel, Ian Galbraith, Jason Gathorne-Hardy, Sam Gardiner, Carlo Gébler, Peter Geoghegan, Harry Josephine Giles, Ruth Gilligan, Alan Gillis, Rodge Glass, John Glenday, Ian Goldin, Rody Gorman, John Gray, Eamon Grennan, Vona Groarke, David Grossman, André Gumuchdjian, Michael Hamburger, Scott Hames, Hugo Hamilton, Bobbie Hanvey, Kerry Hardie, Francis Harvey, Seamus Heaney, President Michael D. Higgins, Alex Hijmans, Eva Hoffman, Brian Holton, Joseph Horgan, Brian Horton, Art Hughes, Pearse Hutchinson, Sarah Jackson, Kathleen Jamie, Robert Alan Jamieson, Esther Jansma, Biddy Jenkinson, Francis Jones, Benjamin Keatinge, Morgan Kelly, Jennifer Kerr, Thomas Kilroy, David Kinloch, Matt Kirkham, Philip Knox, Julia Kristeva, Helen Lewis, Nigel Lewis, Toby Litt, Sheila Llewellyn, Edna Longley, Michael Longley, Barry Lopez, Pura López Colomé, Seán Lysaght, Marcas Mac an Tuairneir, Aifric Mac Aodha, Liam Mac Cóil, Pádraig Mac Fherghusa, Seán Mac Mathúna, Sean MacAindreasa, Murdo Macdonald, Tom MacIntyre, Peter MacKay, Justyna Mackowska, Bernard MacLaverty, Tony MacMahon, Aonghas MacNeacail, Aodán MacPóilin, Deirdre Madden, Paul Maddern, Jim Maginn, Sarah Maguire, Rusmir Mahmutćehajić, Derek Mahon, Fred Marchant, Joan Margarit, Lara Marlowe, Erich Marx, Aidan Carl Mathews, Nathaniel McAuley, Gerard McCarthy, Thomas McCarthy, Mike McCormack, Enda McDonagh, Manfred McDowell, Robert McDowell, Iggy McGovern, Medbh McGuckian, John McHugo, Belinda McKeon, Donal McLaughlin, Andrew McNeillie, Monica McWilliams, Askold Melnyczuk, Samuel Menashe, Máire Mhac an tSaoi, Immanuel Mifsud, John Minihan, Deborah Moffatt, Zakaria Mohammed, Ed Moloney, Alfonso Monreal, John Montague, Sinéad Morrissey, Niamh Morritt, Paul Muldoon, Dervla Murphy, Richard Murphy, Mira Nair, Máirín Nic Eoin, Dairena Ní Chinnéide, Caitríona Ní Chléirchín, Nuala Ní Dhomhnaill, Eithne Ní Ghallchobhair, Colette Ní Ghallchóir, Ailbhe Ní Ghearbhuigh, Brighid Ní Mhóráin, Naomi Shihab Nye, Micheál Ó Conghaile, Malachi O’Doherty, Bernard O’Donoghue, Simon Ó Fáolain, Andrew O’Hagan, Kenneth O’Halloran, Lillis Ó Laoire, Seán Ó Leocháin, Máirtín Ó Muilleoir, Liam Ó Muirthile, Seán Ó Ríordáin, Frank Ormsby, Ciaran O’Rourke, George Orwell, Cathal Ó Searcaigh, Fintan O’Toole, Ruth Padel, Louis de Paor, David Park, Don Paterson, Glenn Patterson, Jessica Lee Patterson, Tom Paulin, Giles Pellerin, Mario Petrucci, Vuk Perušić, Andrew Philip, Robert Pinsky, Andy Pollak, Chris Preddle, Jahan Ramazani, Ron Rash, Sir Martin Rees, Tim Robinson, Aidan Rooney, Gabriel Rosenstock, Joseph Roth, Juliana Roth, Nicholas Ruddock, Noel Russell, Stewart Sanderson, Raoul Schrott, Paul Seawright, W. G. Sebald, Mihail Sebastian, Sudeep Sen, Frankie Sewell, Neil Shawcross, Róisín Sheehy, Avi Shlaim, Brendan Simms, Peter Sirr, Damian Smyth, Gerard Smyth, Gary Snyder, Susan Sontag, Pádraig Standún, Larry Stapleton, Dolores Stewart, Will Stone, Morten Strøksnes, Elizabeth Switaj, Malachy Tallack, Amanda Thomson, Richard Tillinghast, Alan Titley, Colm Tóibín, Daniel Tobin, William Trevor, Leslie Van Gelder, Helen Vendler, Marko Vešović, Michael Viney, Hans van de Waarsenburg, Casey Walker, Roseanne Watt, Bruce Weigl, Robert Welch, David Wheatley, Sonya Whitefield, Christopher Whyte, Vincent Woods and Charles Wright
