= Saorsa =

- First edition
- Language: Scottish Gaelic
- Genre: Short story
- Publisher: Ùr-sgeul
- Publication date: 2011
- Publication place: Scotland
- Media type: Print (paperback)
- Pages: 151 pp
- ISBN: 978-1900901819
- OCLC: 781996060

Saorsa is a collection of short stories in Scottish Gaelic edited by Joan NicDhòmhnaill and John Storey and published by Ùr-sgeul in 2011. While varied, the stories explore the shared themes of moral ambiguity, subversion and law breaking. Crime, drugs, plastic surgery, poverty, abuse, neoliberalism, tourism, cultural identity, migration, murder, love, betrayal, politics, social and economic history are some of the topics explored in the collection.

== The stories ==
In all, Saorsa includes 13 new short stories from 13 writers:

- Luathas-teichidh by Tim Armstrong
- Dh'fhalbh sin, 's thàinig seo by Maureen NicLeòid
- Dorsan by Annie NicLeòid Hill
- An Fhianais by Màiri Anna NicDhòmhnaill
- An Comann by Seonaidh Adams
- Saorsa gun chrìch by Mìcheal Klevenhaus
- An Drochaid by Mona Claudia Wagner
- Sandra agus Ceit by Seònaid NicDhòmhnaill
- Playa de la Suerte by Gillebrìde Mac 'IlleMhaoil
- Iain MacAonghais by Neil McRae
- Euceartas Ait by Cairistìona Stone
- An Dotair Eile by Pàdraig MacAoidh
- Chanadh gun do chuir i às dha by Meg Bateman

== Reception ==
The collection was generally praised. Aonghas MacNeacail wrote in a review in the West Highland Free Press that the Saorsa was "a reason for hope and excitement", and Moray Watson wrote in his review in Northwords Now that the collection advanced the development of Gaelic prose in general.
