= Donald Meek Awards =

The Donald Meek Award (Scottish Gaelic: Duais Dhòmhnaill Meek), named in honour of Scottish Gaelic writer and professor Donald Meek, were annual prizes for original literary works in Scottish Gaelic of any genre. The awards were given by The Gaelic Books Council (Comhairle nan Leabhraichean) from 2010-2019 and were funded by Creative Scotland and Bòrd na Gàidhlig.

The awards were succeeded by The Gaelic Literature Awards in 2020, which has several categories for prizes including the Donald Meek Award for Best Non-fiction Book, named as a legacy of the Donald Meek Award.

Year	Award	Author	Work	Publisher
2019	First Prize	John Urquhart	Turas	
2019	Second Prize	Myles Campbell	Gràs	
2019	Third Prize	Morag Ann MacNeil	Artair sa Chaisteal	
2018	First Prize	Roddy MacLean	Còig Duilleagan na Seamraig	
2018	Second Prize	Marion F. Morrison	Adhbhar ar Sòlais	
2018	Third Prize	Angus Peter Campbell	Constabal Murdo	
2017	First Prize	Iain MacRae	Taigh Sheonachain	
2017	Second Prize	Eoghann Stewart	Beam Sgèithe	
2017	Third Prize	Morag Ann MacNeil	Èiginn Ùisdein	
2016	First Prize	Peter Mackay and John S MacPherson	An Leabhar Liath	Luath Press
2016	Second Prize	Sandy NicDhòmhnaill Jones	Crotal Ruadh/Red Lichen	Acair
2016	Third Prize	Seonag Monk	Mil san Tì	Acair
2016	Shortlisted	Seonaidh Charity	An Làmh a Bheir	Sandstone Press
2016	Shortlisted	John Urquhart	Breab, Breab, Breab	Acair
2016	Shortlisted	Morag Ann MacNeil	Granaidh Afraga	
2015	First Prize	Alasdair Caimbeul	Ro Fhada san t-Suidheachadh Seo	CLÀR
2015	Second place	Roddy MacLean	An Creanaiche	Sandstone Press
2015	Third place	Rody Gorman	Air a' Chruard	
2015	Shortlisted	Steaphanaidh Chaimbeul	An Raga	
2014	First Prize	Norma Macleod	An Dosan	
