= Tormod Caimbeul =

Scottish Gaelic writer (1942–2015)

Tormod Caimbeul (7 October 1942 – 2 May 2015) was a Scottish Gaelic novelist, poet, author of children's literature, and translator. He was known by his nickname "Tormod a' Bhocsair". He is recognised as one of the most important Gaelic writers of the 20th century.

== Life ==
Tormod Caimbeul was born in South Dell, Ness, Lewis. His father, Aonghas Caimbeul (nicknamed Am Bocsair), and his uncle, Aonghas Caimbeul (nicknamed Am Puilean), were both well-known Gaelic poets. Alasdair Caimbeul, Tormod's brother, is a Gaelic novelist and playwright. His daughter Catrìona Lexy Chaimbeul writers Gaelic fiction, poetry, and drama, and is also active as a director and actor.

After attending the University of Edinburgh and Jordanhill College of Education, he worked as a teacher of Gaelic and English in Glasgow, South Uist, and Lewis.

== Writing ==
Caimbeul published three novels during his lifetime: Deireadh an Fhoghair (1979), Shrapnel (2006), and An Druim bho Thuath (2011). His short stories appeared in three collections: Hostail (Hostel, 1992), An Naidheachd bhon Taigh (1994), and Sgeulachdan sa Chiaradh (2015). Shrapnel has been recently adapted for the stage by Catrìona Lexy Chaimbeul and the company Theatre Gu Leòr. He also wrote many lovely poems, such as Cur-seachad, a piece of poetry about getting outdoors and stopping spending so much time on screens.
