= Tim Armstrong (writer) =

Scottish researcher

Timothy Currie Armstrong is a Scottish Gaelic punk musician, novelist, and academic from Seattle, Washington.

== Early life ==
Armstrong was a member of several punk bands in Brunswick, Maine, in the late eighties, including Officer Friendly, while studying for a BA in biology at Bowdoin College; he graduated with honors in 1990. He stated in an interview for Radio nan Gàidheal that he has thirteen tattoos, many of which were from this period of his life, expressing his rebellious punk values and pacifism. After spending some years living in Scotland and meeting other Gaelic-speaking punks such as Ruairidh of Oi Polloi, he started learning Gaelic.

== Mill a h-Uile Rud ==
The band, whose name translates as "Destroy Everything", formed in 2003 and retain their original line-up of Armstrong (vocals, guitar), Sgrios a h-Uile Rud (vocals, bass) and Sìne Nic Anndrais (drums).

In April 2005, Mill a h-Uile Rud embarked on a European tour with Oi Polloi, another Scottish Gaelic punk band, which took them to Scotland, Belgium, the Netherlands, Germany and Poland. Much of this tour was filmed by BBC Alba for a Gaelic television documentary on Mill a h-Uile Rud and Gaelic punk. They have also played in Stornoway, on the sparsely populated Isle of Lewis, the largest town in the Western Isles of Scotland. They also recorded a live session for the BBC Radio nan Gaidheal nighttime 'Rapal' program which is broadcast nationally in Scotland.

== In Scotland ==
In 2005, Armstrong moved to Scotland full-time to study sociolinguistics and language revival at Sabhal Mòr Ostaig, earning a BA in Gaelic Language and Culture in 2006 and a Ph.D. in 2009. The band is less active, although it still performs from time to time when Armstrong is back in Seattle. Armstrong was also involved in the Gaelic techno/hip-hop act, Nad Aislingean, the Gaelic rock band, Na Gathan. He is currently a researcher and senior lecturer in Gaelic and Communication at Sabhal Mòr Ostaig.

== Air Cuan Dubh Drilseach ==
Air Cuan Dubh Drilseach is a science fiction novel written in Scottish Gaelic by Armstrong and published by CLÀR in 2013. It was launched in Edinburgh with Mill a h-Uile Rud's contemporaries Oi Polloi at an illegal street gig on Leith Walk outside Elvis Shakespeare, and later at The Cruz boat on The Shore with Comann Ceilteach Oilthigh Dhun Eideann and CLÀR. Air Cuan Dubh Drilseach is the first hard science-fiction novel in Gaelic written for adults. The story combines elements of space opera, dark cyberpunk, romance and rock-band road-trip adventure. The central conceit of the novel is that in space, everyone speaks Gaelic, allowing the author to create an entirely Gaelic-speaking world for the characters. In 2013, Air Cuan Dubh Drilseach won the Saltire Society Scottish First Book of the Year Award.
