= Civil-police relations =

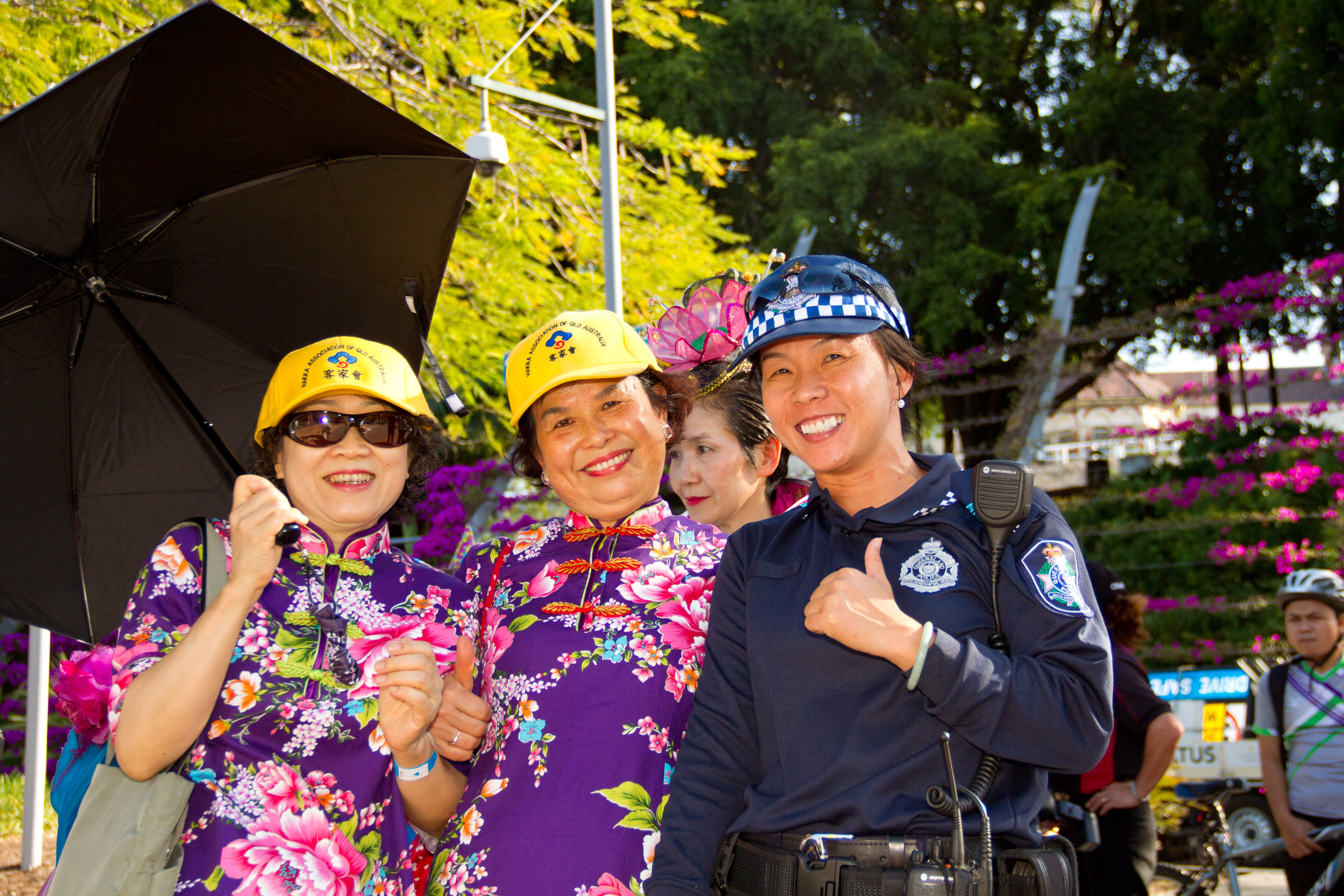
Positive civil–police relations: a Queensland Police Service officer with the Chinese Australian community during the 2014 G20 Brisbane summit

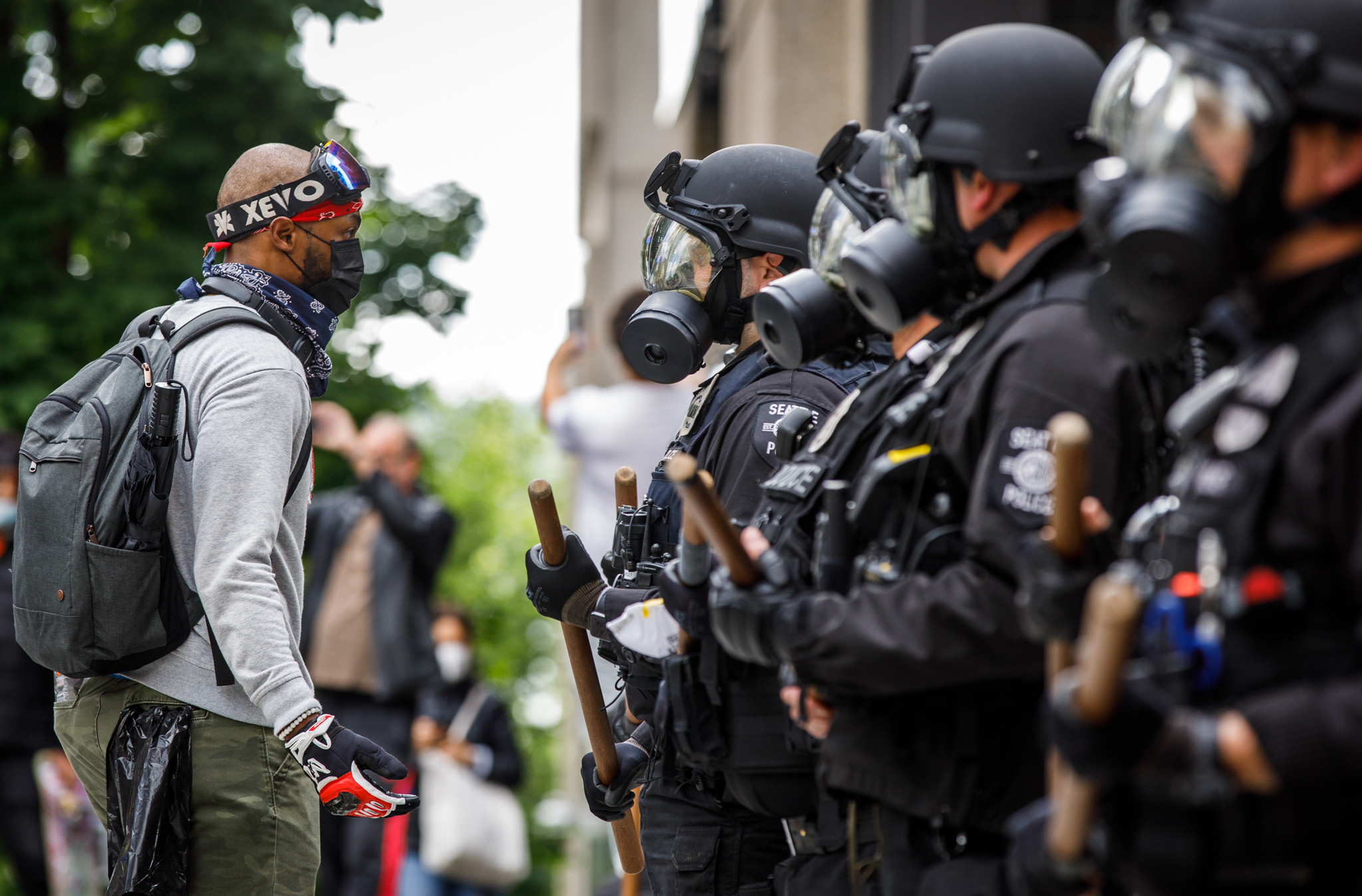
Negative civil–police relations: an exchange between a protestor and Seattle Police Department riot officers during the 2020 George Floyd protests

Civil–police relations describes the relationship police and similar public servants trusted with law enforcement have with civilians and the public. Police officers, who are tasked with enforcing laws and keeping the peace within a society, have the most contact with civilians of all other public servants. While it is in the best interest of them to cooperate mutually, the relationship between police and civilians—which are generally diverse and complex across and within different countries and societies—is not always harmonious, and issues such as police corruption, police brutality, militarization of police, and institutional racism can negatively affect public perceptions of police, trust in law enforcement, and thus also civil–police relations.

The analysis, measurement, and study of civil–police relations draws upon diverse fields including political science, law, criminology, criminal justice, philosophy, sociology, economics, psychology, cultural studies, and history. Many subjects and issues are explored under the concept of civil–police relations including police legitimacy, public administration, community policing, democratic policing, counterterrorism, racial disparities, and societal standards.

Policing by gendarmerie is generally viewed as inseparable from politics, as police act under the authority of whichever government is in power; thus, civil–police relations is also said to be the mirror of the relationship between the government and their citizenry, and the state of civil–police relations is sometimes considered a measurement of a country's democracy. Similarly, police are also sometimes considered to reflect a society's broader values and beliefs, making civilians the ones who set the benchmark for civil–police relations. Different police forces use different styles of policing, with different societal expectations and perceptions of the police, making for variables in civil–police relations.

Peelian principles public relations-based, community-oriented style of policing tends to be more favored by civilians than intensive, direct, security-based policing often associated with militarization.

== History ==
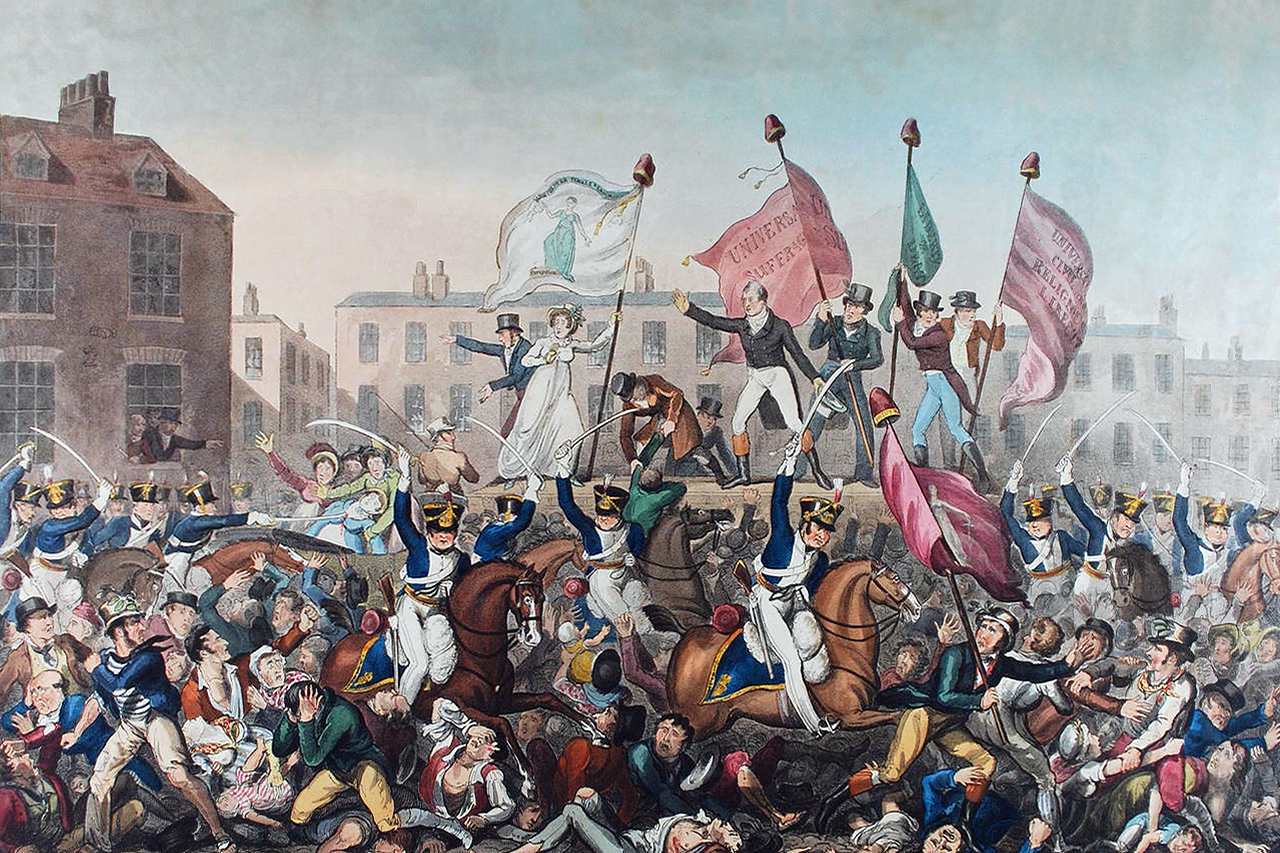
The 1819 Peterloo Massacre led to the creation of the Metropolitan Police

During the Anglo-Saxon era, the King assumed the role of the commander-in-chief of the police. The main task of the police was to ensure that there was peace and orderliness in society. The ruling monarch of England maintained that it wanted its police force to be local and mutual. These qualities are still desired in the police today.

The civilians were typically submissive to the monarchy, following the said rules and regulations obediently. The civilians did as they were told given that the position the police had in the society was authoritative. There was not any significant tension between civilians and the police, as there was no room for civilians to voice out against whatever rules and regulations were imposed.

The formal history of modern police dates as far back as the 19th century in Europe. The general role and responsibilities of police are often revisited and redefined with changes and reform, but the purpose of maintaining civil peace in society remained. Three models of police have been acknowledged as considerable influences to the current model of policing:

1. The Irish model of primarily military-controlled policing (gendarmerie, military police, etc.), separate from civilian institutions
2. The British model of primarily civilian-controlled constabulary policing (municipal police, national police, etc.), separate from the military
3. The French model of dual military and civilian policing, coexisting as separate but cooperative institutions

All three models have evolved over time and have been adopted separately in various countries.

In the early 20th century, civilian and police in Scotland had an individualized and interpersonal relationship. They relied on the trust they had on each other to maintain peace. By late twentieth century, the police force had established a more formal relationship with the civilians, stressing more on procedures and structure.

== Contemporary relations ==
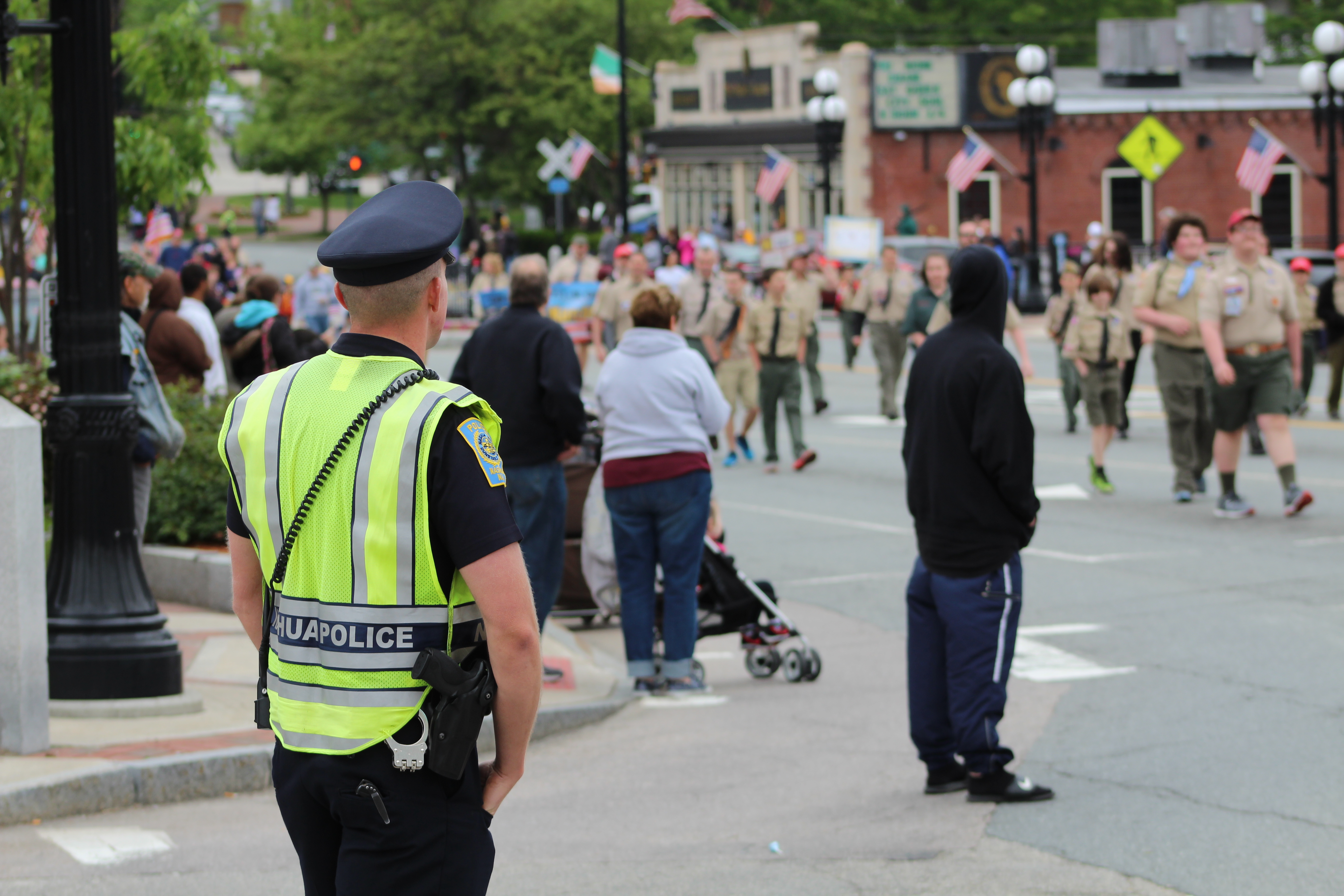
A police officer overseeing a Memorial Day parade in Nashua, New Hampshire in 2017

Civil–police relations differs from one country to another. Democratic countries with liberal views are more likely to have amicable relations with their police forces. Even within a country, different communities have different relationships with the police force. Within a community, many factors affect their between these two stakeholders, such as Among others; cultural, social and economic.

While it is commonly understood that the police are to serve the civilians, there have been disputes regarding who they actually serve. In the U.S., there are concerns as the police are getting increasingly militarized, involved with counterinsurgency, and even privatized.

In the present, the police have consistently garnered negative press, which has worsened civil–police relations. Fatal police shootings, mishandling of public protests, and racial and ethnic discrimination, among others, have been contributing factors to the civilians' distrust in the police. The press has more freedom, and civilians have more rights, leading to broader public opinions on police operations. In a democratic society, civilians are no longer willing to be submissive to whatever rules and regulations they are asked to follow. There is a demand for transparency and accountability from all, especially those who hold power. Some high-profile events that define the contemporary relations between police and civilians in the 21st century are Black Lives Matter, and the protests that followed the police killings of Michael Brown, Eric Garner, Freddie Gray, and George Floyd.

Some police officers retaliate the civilians' sentiment, arguing that their job is thankless and underappreciated, or that the public does not understand the nuances and realities of policing. The direction that a police force takes is often controlled externally; it has no extraordinary power or insured from exemptions as any ordinary civilian.

=== Controversies ===
Police-involved deaths have been escalating in several countries. Police-involved deaths in the U.S. often gain international media coverage, especially considering the likelihood of them occurring with minorities, further staining the image of police internationally. With the escalation of police shootings rising, civil–police relations are strained.

There have been increasing concern with regard to the conduct of the police force, whether they treat civilians fairly and respectfully. With the heightened publicization of police violence, racial profiling, and political tension in the U.S., the civilian perspective of the police is generally negative and distrustful, being that of authority abusers who fail civilians, which hinders the maintenance of peace in a society.

== Civil–police relations by country ==
=== Hong Kong ===
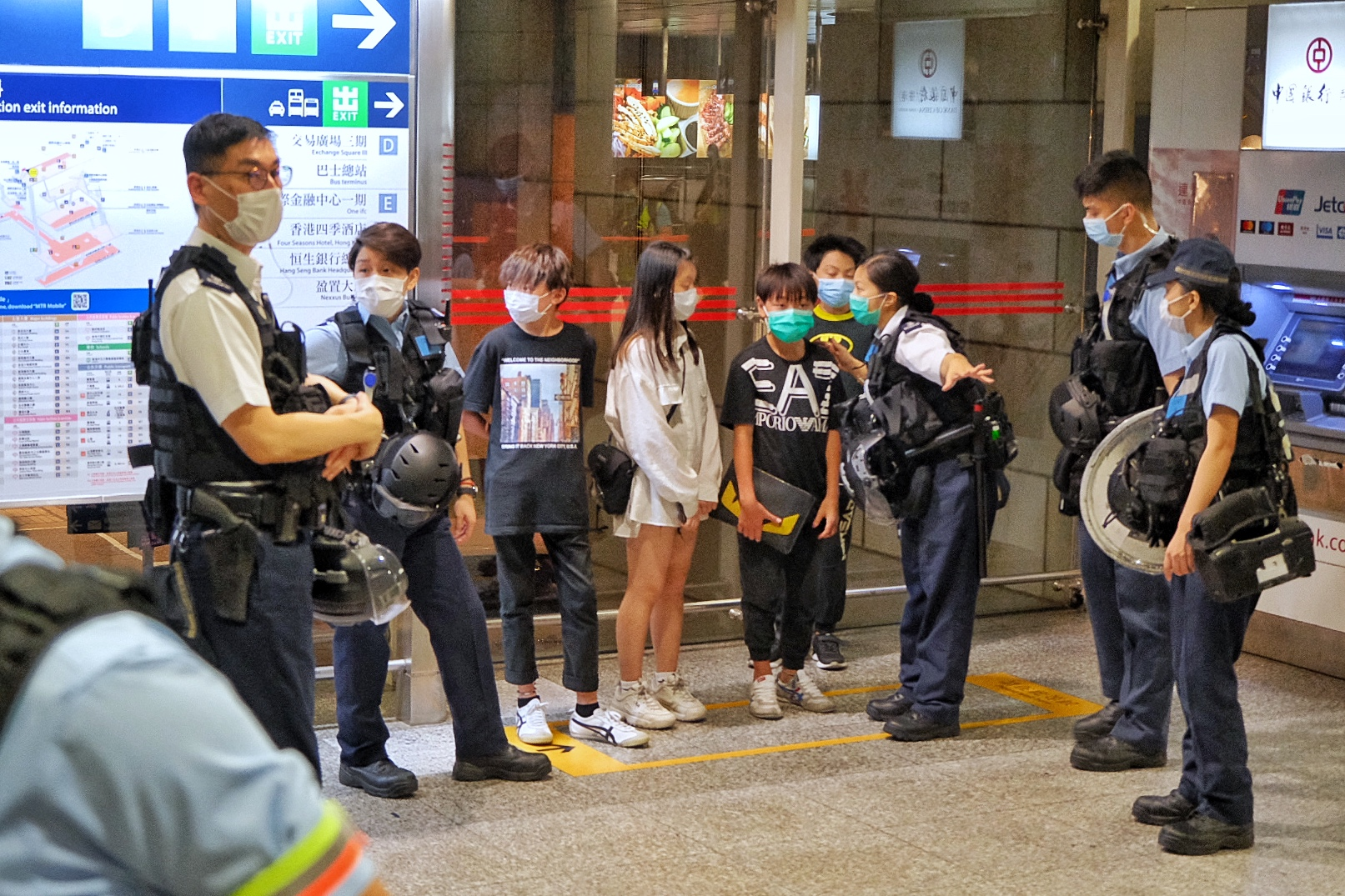
Hong Kong Police Force officers detaining a group of teenagers in 2020

In Hong Kong, police-led violence was historically rare, and the Hong Kong Police Force was generally well-respected. However, the 21st century rise of civil disobedience movements such as the 2013–2014 Occupy Central movement and pro-democracy protests such as the 2019–2020 Hong Kong protests have led to a dramatic tarnishing of civil–police relations. Part of the downturn in public perception of police results from several instances of police brutality and unnecessary force against largely peaceful protestors, or allegedly overwhelming and excessive force against otherwise minor clashes as part of riot control, such as when riot squads responded to thrown objects and police line breaches during the 2019–2020 protests with unprecedented amounts of tear gas, rubber bullets, and bean bag rounds against protestors and even the press.

Hong Kong Police Force officers have responded to negative public perceptions themselves on various occasions. For instance, after seven police officers were charged for the beating of Ken Tsang in 2014, several police officers openly spoke out in support of the disciplined officers or to allege the police were being treated unfairly over isolated incidents, which some officers controversially compared to Nazi Germany's persecution of Jews. However, in other instances, the Hong Kong Police Force has sought to learn from their criticism to reduce the deterioration of civil–police relations, such as when, following backlash for the aforementioned excessive force during the 2019–2020 protests, police riot squads began using noticeably less force to handle protests.

The Hong Kong–Mainland China conflict, China's growing influence over the government of Hong Kong since the handover of Hong Kong in 1997, and the pro-police attitude of the pro-Beijing camp, has also created the assumption among the public that the Hong Kong Police Force is highly influenced and controlled by the government of China, despite Hong Kong law prohibiting the mainland government from influencing and interfering with Hong Kong's local law enforcement affairs.

=== Israel ===
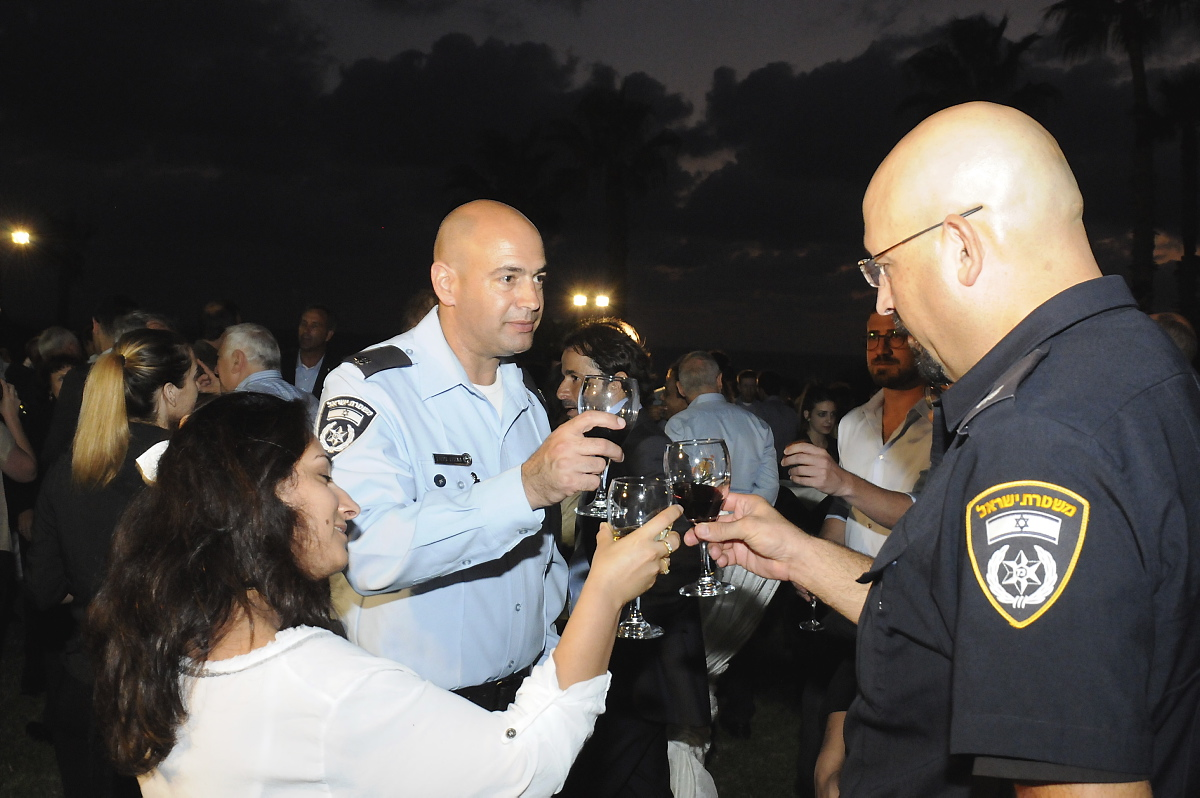
Israel Police officers at a Rosh Hashanah celebration in 2015

In Israel, public trust in the Israel Police is strained by their close cooperation with the Israel Defense Forces and increasing focus on counterterrorism. In Israeli society, the police and the military have had different relations with the public, with the police having a closer community-like relationship, and the military being considered more authoritative. However, considerable police militarization, and the apparent shifting goal of the Israel Police from community service to counterterrorism, has made it such that Israeli civilians sometimes find it difficult to distinguish between the police and the IDF, creating anxiety and distrust.

=== Philippines ===
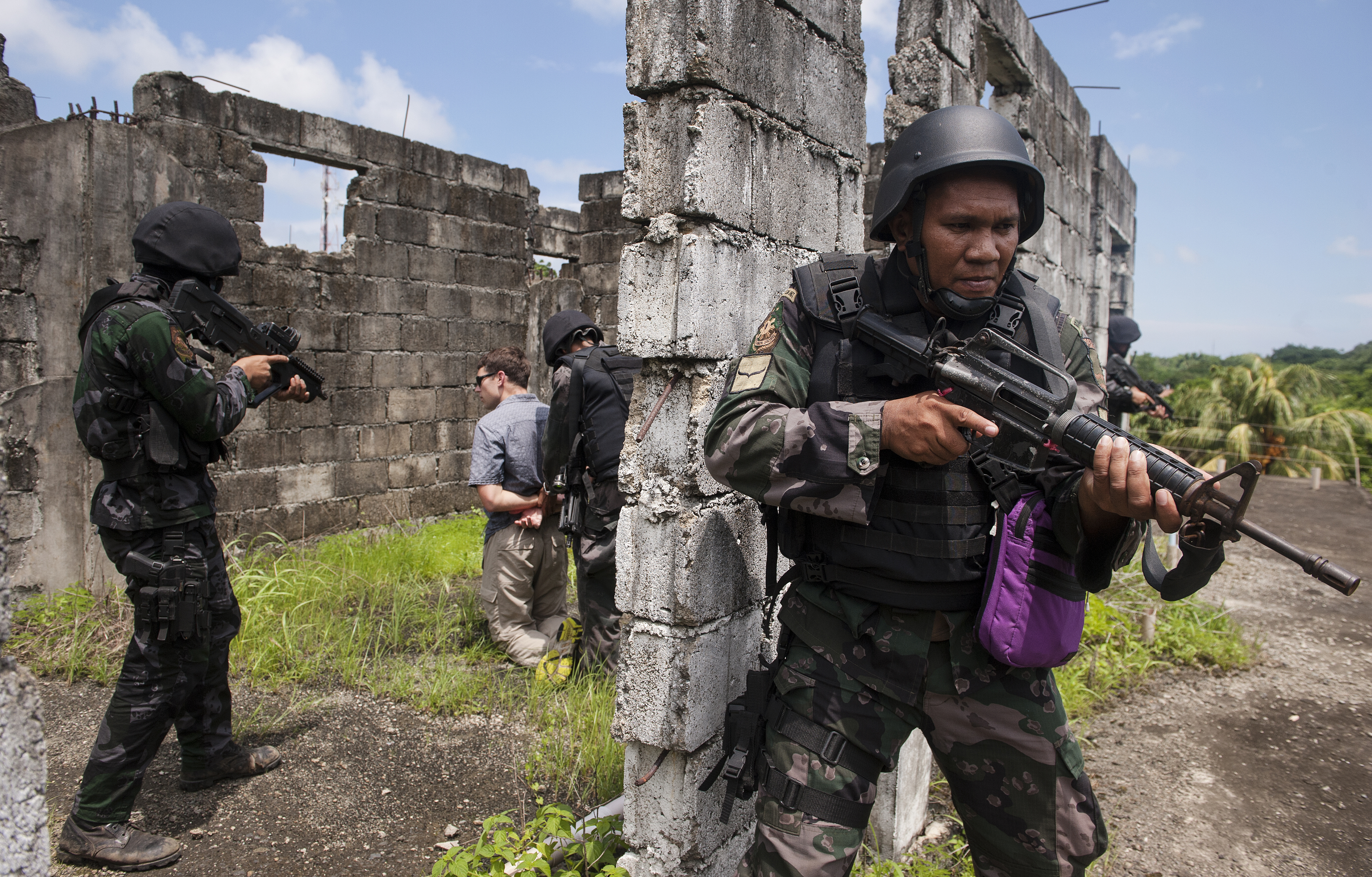
Philippine National Police Maritime Group officers during training in 2014

In the Philippines, over 5,000 people have been killed by the Philippine National Police in the Philippine drug war. Police have been accused of sexual assaults, falsifying crimes, unlawful killings, planting evidences, and burglary, and they are often viewed as abusive and oppressive, especially in relation to the poor, under the guise of enforcing laws. These, combined with the aftermath of fatal anti-narcotic operations, has stained civil–police relations and created a resentful relationship.

== See also ==
- Civil-military relations
- Community policing
- Police brutality
- Police corruption
