= Catrìona Lexy Chaimbeul =

Scottish novelist

- Born: 1982 (age 43–44); Ness, Lewis, Scotland
- Education: University of Edinburgh (M.A.)
- Occupations: Poet, novelist, dramatist, actor
- Relatives: Tormod Caimbeul (father); Alasdair Caimbeul (paternal uncle)
- Writing career
- Language: Scottish Gaelic

Catrìona Lexy Chaimbeul (born 1982), also known as Catriona Lexy Campbell, is a Scottish poet, novelist, dramatist, and actor, working mainly in Scottish Gaelic.

== Life ==
Chaimbeul was born into a well-known literary family in Ness, Lewis. Her father, Tormod Caimbeul (also known as Tormod a' Bhocsair and Norman Campbell), and her uncle Alasdair Caimbeul are both published writers in Gaelic, as was her grandfather Aonghas Caimbeul (Am Bocsair) and her great-uncle, war poet and award-winning memoirist, Aonghas Caimbeul (Am Puilean). Her mother, Mary Jane Campbell, is a Gaelic Traditional singer.

Chaimbeul attended the University of Edinburgh (M.A. in Mental Philosophy). She worked as an actor and tutor in Gaelic drama, including two years with Eden Court Theatre in Inverness as the Gaelic Drama Artist for Skye and Lochalsh, and in 2011-12 was the first Gaelic Associate Artist at the National Theatre of Scotland. The family's connection with Sabhal Mòr Ostaig, the National Centre for the Gaelic Language and Culture, now part of the University of the Highlands and Islands, has included periods as writer-in-residence for both Tormod and Alasdair Caimbeul, and Mary Jane is a lecturer at the centre. In January 2013 Catrìona was appointed for a one-year term as writer-in-residence at Sabhal Mòr.

== Prizes and awards ==
- 2006 Wigtown Book Festival Gaelic poetry prize

== Bibliography ==
Chaimbeul has described the major themes of her work as being "inter-personal relationships, secrets and lies, and the supernatural".

Novels:

- Cleasan a' Bhaile Mhòir. Sandstone Press. 2009. ISBN 978-1-905-20729-9. (as Catriona Lexy Campbell)
- Samhraidhean Dìomhair. CLÀR. 2009. ISBN 978-1-900-90131-4.
- Cluicheadairean. Acair Ltd. 2013. ISBN 978-0-861-52546-1.
- Nigheanan Mòra. Sandstone Press. 2014. ISBN 978-1-908-73796-0.

Children's books:

- Balach Beag a Mhàthar. Acair/Stòrlann Nàiseanta na Gàidhlig. 2004. ISBN 978-0-861-52611-6.
- Sgeulachdan Eagalach Feagalach. Acair Ltd. 2008. ISBN 978-0-861-52336-8.
- An t-Ionnsachadh Bòidheach: Pàirt 1 - Am Fuachd Gorm. Stòrlann Nàiseanta na Gàidhlig/Acair Ltd. 2014. ISBN 978-0-861-52570-6.
- An t-Ionnsachadh Bòidheach: Pàirt 2 - Campa na Cloinne. Stòrlann Nàiseanta na Gàidhlig/Acair Ltd. 2015. ISBN 978-0-861-52595-9.

Stage plays:

- Doras Dùinte. Leabhraichean Beaga. 2013.
- Shrapnel: An Dealbh-chluich. Leabhraichean Beaga. 2016. ISBN 978-0-946-42755-0.

Educational publications:

- Speaking Our Language: Pasgan Luchd-oideachaidh. Sreath 1. Comunn na Gàidhlig. 1994.

In December 2012 BBC Scotland broadcast a play based on her novel Samhraidhean Dìomhair.
