= Scott Hechinger =

American civil rights attorney

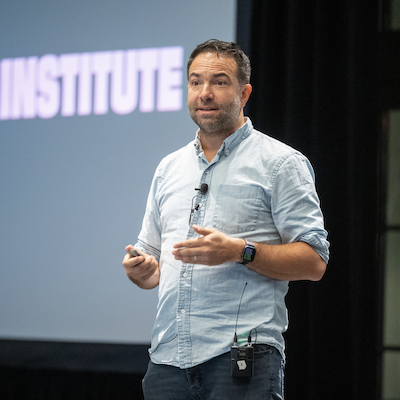
Hechinger presenting at a conference in 2022.

Scott Hechinger is an American civil rights attorney, former public defender and the founder and executive director of Zealous, a nonprofit organization that trains public defenders and activists to use media, technology, the arts, and storytelling to shape criminal justice policy. Hechinger teaches at The University of Chicago Law School as an adjunct professor.

== Career ==
Hechinger graduated from Duke University in 2004 with a Bachelor of Arts degree and earned his Juris Doctor degree from New York University School of Law. Upon graduation, he was awarded the "Ann Petluck Poses Memorial Prize" for excellence in clinical work and was named a Florence Allen Scholar.

After law school, he clerked for Judge Raymond Dearie on the U.S. District Court for the Eastern District of New York. Hechinger then worked as an attorney for the Partnership for Children's Rights where he represented children and families in special education litigation, before starting his career as a public defender at Brooklyn Defender Services.

=== Brooklyn Defender Services ===
Hechinger began work as a public defender for the Brooklyn Defender Services (BDS) in 2012. Hechinger was long outspoken about his frustration of not being able to do individual or systemic justice work given the limitation of court. Hechinger co-founded the Brooklyn Community bail fund, now called Envision Freedom Fund.

As a public defender, he exposed the perjury of a NYPD officer that resulted in a wrongful conviction. He criticized ICE agents targeting and arresting non-citizens when they appeared in court. He alleged that there was a group of NYPD officers who invented criminal informants to meet quotas. He challenged the prosecutorial practice of charging young single mothers with Endangerment for leaving their children alone for short periods of time to run necessary errands and even to give birth. Hechinger raised awareness about the NYPD arresting people for the use of THC vape pens even after NYPD pledged to stop marijuana arrests.

Hechinger was outspoken about the unjust practices in New York criminal courts. In 2017, Hechinger began to use Twitter to spread awareness about the injustices he witnessed in New York courtrooms, and later, began speaking out on Instagram and TikTok.

=== Zealous ===
Hechinger founded and directs Zealous, a national advocacy and education initiative, aimed at supporting and organizing public defenders and community advocates to better tell the stories of injustice in the American criminal legal system.

In 2022, Zealous brought together allies in the Chicago community for the Chicago Transformation Collab, a summit and storytelling training, and public arts festival to build alignment and strategy.

Hechinger has collaborated with Fiona Apple on multiple campaigns and projects, including access to courts, court watching, a film on how to safely record interactions with ICE agents, and telling the stories of injustice in Prince George's County, Maryland criminal courts. He also worked with Apple to advocate for fair trials in Oregon.

== Writings and commentary ==
Hechinger regularly writes and provides commentary about issues related to the American criminal legal system.

=== Bail Reform movement ===
Hechinger has been an advocate for bail reform for many years. In 2018, he told NowThis News that “Here’s what’s crazy: five minutes is over five times longer than the time it takes judges in the criminal court where I practice to decide to jail one of my clients pretrial, presumed innocent until their case is over, on cash bail they can’t possibly afford.”

He has written about bail reform in New York. Hechinger told NBC News in 2022 that "it's misleading to tie bail changes to crime surges because 'reforms happened in very few places, rising crime happened everywhere.'"

=== Mandatory minimum sentencing ===
He has argued that mandatory minimum sentencing enables police misconduct.

=== Media ===
Hechinger regularly criticizes the news media for their coverage of crime and criminal justice policies. Hechinger has noted that many journalists seek out sensational stories about bail reform. He has argued that there is a pro-police worldview deeply engrained in journalism (see also: copaganda).

He has criticized The New York Times including for their use of data in reporting on crime.

=== Cannabis ===
Hechinger believes that excessive prison sentences for cannabis offenses are egregious and that police interactions for cannabis are "unnecessary and unjust." In response to U.S. President Joe Biden calling for the release of Brittney Griner, Hechinger wrote: "Joe Biden's calling for her [Griner’s] release and talking about how unjust a nine-year sentence is—40,000 people today are incarcerated for marijuana offenses in the United States, even as the legal cannabis industry is booming.”

=== Legal innocence ===
In the response to the Supreme Court of the United States's May 2022 ruling that innocence is not enough to overturn a murder conviction, he wrote: "Know this: Yesterday the U.S. Supreme Court ruled it is perfectly Constitutional to imprison and execute people, *even those who have evidence of their innocence & inadequate counsel.* Not just that: They ruled the Constitution prohibits even evidentiary hearings to look into it."

=== Mass incarceration ===
Hechinger has been critical of the American criminal justice system. He advocates for more investment in affordable housing, mental health and substance abuse treatment, and poverty alleviation. He has criticized the conditions at Rikers Island jail complex, and at the Metropolitan Detention Center, Brooklyn. He has advocated for the closure of Rikers. He has criticized the foster care system in New York.

During the COVID-19 pandemic, Hechinger advocated for the release of people from jails and prisons to the protect the health of those who were incarcerated. He helped found the "Gasping for Justice" Project. He raised awareness about a COVID-19 outbreak in Prince George's County, Maryland jails.

Hechinger told Mother Jones: "We, as a society, spend more on policing, prosecution, and prisons than any other society in the history of the world. And still, we are not the most healthy or safe society in the history of the world. And so we should be questioning why that is.”

In response to jail sentence of Jussie Smollett, Hechinger wrote: "However you feel about Jussie Smollett & what he did, why does any jailtime, let alone 150 days make sense? Enormous taxpayer cost. His careers deeply damaged so punishment’s exacted. Forget rehabilitation: he’ll come out far more damaged than when he went in. A costly waste.” He said of the trial of the men convicted of killing Ahmaud Arbery in Georgia state court, "To me, the trials underscore how ill-equipped the criminal legal system, process, and punishment is to achieve accountability and healing." In response to Paul Manafort's prison sentence, Hechinger wrote: “For context on Manafort’s 47 months in prison, my client yesterday was offered 36-72 months in prison for stealing $100 worth of quarters from a residential laundry room.”

=== Policing ===
Hechinger has reported on the practice of some police to initiate arrests for low-level offenses at the end of their shifts in order to collect overtime pay. Hechinger has criticized the New York Police Department for police brutality, and corruption. He has also questioned the efficacy of policing "reforms" in New York. He has criticized the NYPD for arresting people for evading subway fare.

Hechinger believes that crime stoppers hotlines encourage sketchy tips and harm low-income criminal defendants. He has argued that prosecutors should not accept cases from officers with documented credibility issues.

He has criticized Nassau County prosecutors for targeting Black and Brown people with felony charges for traffic-related infractions. He criticized NY prosecutors for using DNA evidence to coerce plea bargains.

=== Racism in the legal system ===
Hechinger criticized Attorney General William Barr for his refusal to acknowledge the role that racism plays in the American criminal legal system.
