= Ruairidh MacIlleathain =

Scottish Gaelic broadcaster and author

Ruairidh MacIlleathain is a Scottish Gaelic broadcaster and author with an interest in Gaelic learners. He edited the learner's newsletter Cothrom (published by Clì Gàidhlig) and hosts the radio shows Litir do Luchd-ionnsachaidh and An Litir Bheag on BBC Radio nan Gàidheal every week.

He wrote The Gaelic Place Names and Heritage of Inverness (ISBN 095489250X).
