= Alasdair Caimbeul (writer) =

- Born: 27 May 1941 (age 85); Ness, Lewis, Scotland
- Occupation: Writer
- Relatives: Tormod Caimbeul (brother); Catrìona Lexy Chaimbeul (niece)
- Writing career
- Language: Scottish Gaelic, English

Alasdair Caimbeul (born 27 May 1941), also known as Alasdair a' Bhocsair or Alasdair Campbell, is a Scottish playwright, short story writer, and novelist from Ness on the Isle of Lewis. Renowned for writing many stories in his native tongue Gaelic, in addition to a few in English, he is a native of the Isle of Lewis.

== Life ==
He was born on 27 May 1941 in Ness, Lewis. His brother, Tormod Caimbeul (Tormod A' Bhocsair), was also a writer. Their father was Aonghas Caimbeul (Am Bocsair), and their uncle was another notable Scottish Gaelic writer, Aonghas Caimbeul "Am Puilean", as is his niece, Catrìona Lexy Chaimbeul. He lived in Drochaid Chonain in Ross-shire in the 1990s, and was living in Ness as of 2001.

== Literary work ==
He has written plays, short stories, and novels in Scottish Gaelic and in English. He began to write in Gaelic in 1984. Bùth a' Bhaile ("the store of the town") was his first play. He was involved with theater companies, among them 'Na Nisich' in Lewis and Cluicheadairean Loch Aillse. From 1988 to 1990 he was a writer-in-residence at Sabhal Mòr Ostaig on the Isle of Skye. He wrote the novels The Nessman and Visiting the Bard in English.

He won the Stornoway Gazette Award for new play in 2009 at the Royal National Mòd.

His novel Ro Fhada san t-Suidheachadh Seo won the first prize at the 2015 Donald Meek Awards.

== Gaelic publications ==
- 1995. Cha Sgeul Ruin E: Taghadh De Sgeulachdan O Chaochladh ùghdaran, Acair, ISBN 0861521854
- 1989. le Aonghas MacDhòmhnaill Murchadh agus Am Bradan Steòrnabhagh: Acair

- nobhail don òigridh

- 1990. Trì dealbhan-cluiche Slèite, An t-Eilean Sgitheanach: Clò Ostaig ISBN 0951641905

- Ro-ràdh (dha Magaidh Choineagan)
- Bùth a' Bhaile
- A' Home Brew
- Dol a dh'fhaicinn Nighean an Rìgh

- 1992. Am Fear Meadhanach Conon Bridge: Druim Fraoich ISBN 1874022038 (nobhail)
- 1999. Lìontan sgaoilte Slèite, [An t-Eilean Sgitheanach]: Cànan ISBN 1897873743
- 2011. Cuid a' chorra-ghrithich Inbhir Nis: Clàr ISBN 9781900901642
- 2011. Sia Dealbhan-cluiche Inbhir Nis: Clàr ISBN 9781900901635

- An staffroom
- Toiseach an earraich
- An sgrìobhaiche
- 'S e seo do bheatha
- Na craoladairean
- Am fear a chaidh dhan eilean.

- 2015. Ro Fhada san t-Suidheachadh Seo. Winner of the first prize at the Donald Meek Awards

== English publications ==
- 2000. The Nessman, Edinburgh:Birlinn, ISBN 1841580902
- 2003. Visiting the Bard, Edinburgh: Polygon, ISBN 1904598021
