= Officer Friendly =

American police promotional program aimed toward children

Officer Friendly is a program to acquaint children and young adults with police as a part of a community relations campaign. The program was especially popular in the United States from the 1960s to the 1980s, but it continues in some police departments to this day. In 1974, the Sears-Roebuck Foundation partnered with John H. Coleman, Jr of the Hampton, Virginia police department and Hampton City school to revise the program. Classroom kits were developed including coloring books, videos, board games, and teaching guides with activities. The classroom kits were distributed to 40 school districts throughout the United States. An original copy of the kit can be found at the Hampton Virginia History Museum.

== Methods ==
The Officer Friendly programs most famously involved police officers visiting pre-school and kindergarten classrooms. In many parts of the United States, Officer Friendly coloring books are distributed to children.

== In popular culture ==
There have been many parodies of the nearly ubiquitous program. In many cases, the term "Officer Friendly" is used sarcastically to refer to an abusive police officer, or as a way of criticizing the depiction as inaccurate.

=== In television ===
- Sketch comedy show SCTV performed a parody skit called "Officer Friendly" on November 28, 1977.
- Rick Grimes, a former sheriff's deputy in The Walking Dead, sarcastically introduces himself to Merle Dixon as "Officer Friendly" while handcuffing him in Season 1, episode 2 "Guts", and Merle refers to him as such derisively.

=== In literature ===
- In The Annihilation Score by Charles Stross, police officer Jim Grey, after developing superpowers, operates as a superhero under the alias Officer Friendly.

== See also ==
- Community policing
- Police
- Copaganda
