= Meg Bateman =

Scottish writer

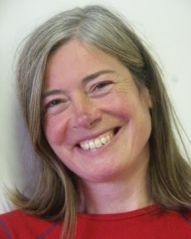
- Born: Vivienne Margaret Bateman; 1959 (age 66–67); Edinburgh, Scotland

Academic work
- Institutions: University of Edinburgh; University of Aberdeen; Sabhal Mòr Ostaig

Vivienne Margaret "Meg" Bateman (born 1959) is a Scottish academic, poet and short story writer. She is best known for her works written in Scottish Gaelic although she has also published work in the English language.

== Education and career ==
Bateman was born in Edinburgh and grew up in the New Town area of the city. She studied Gaelic at the University of Aberdeen and completed a PhD in Gaelic religious poetry. She taught Scottish Gaelic at the University of Aberdeen between 1991 and 1998 before moving to Isle of Skye to teach at Sabhal Mòr Ostaig. She has also taught Scottish Gaelic at the University of Edinburgh and is an Honorary Senior Lecturer at the University of St Andrews.

Bateman's first collection of poems, Òrain Ghaoil (English: Love Songs) was published in 1990 and her second, Aotromachd agus Dàin Eile (English: Lightness and other poems) in 1997. Both collections focus on human relationships and the idealised idea of love. Her third collection, Soirbheas (English: Fair Wind) was published in 2007.

In 2011, Bateman's first published Scottish Gaelic short story, entitled Chanadh gun d'chur i às dha, appeared in the short story collection Saorsa published by CLÀR. Her poetry collection Transparencies was published in 2013 and was her first published work to have both Scottish Gaelic and English poems.

Her Scottish Gaelic poetry has appeared in several anthologies, including Other Tongues (1990) and Twenty of the Best (1990). She has also translated poems from Gaelic into English for An Anthology of Scottish Women Poets (1991) and The Harp's Cry (1993).
