= Tàladh Chrìosda =

Scottish Gaelic Christmas carol

Tàladh Chrìosda ('Christ's lullaby') is the popular name for the Scottish Gaelic Christmas carol Tàladh ar Slànaigheir ('the Lullaby of our Saviour'). It is traditionally sung at Midnight Mass in the Outer Hebrides in Scotland. The 29 verses of the hymn date from the 19th century and are intended to represent a lullaby for the Christ Child by the Blessed Virgin.

The same hymn was popularised throughout the Anglosphere during the early 20th century by Marjory Kennedy-Fraser as an art song with translated lyrics and the title The Christ-Child's Lullaby.

== The Collector ==
The song was written down from the oral tradition by Allan MacDonald and appeared in his 1893 Catholic hymnal in Gaelic. American ethnomusicologist Amy Murray first heard the lullaby being sung from the choir loft of St Michael's Roman Catholic Church upon Eriskay. Deeply moved, she asked MacDonald afterwards whether it was another of his translations of Gregorian chant into Scottish Gaelic. He made a face and admitted that he had transcribed the music and lyrics after hearing the lullaby sung by traditional singers inside a ceilidh house and had included both in his hymnal. MacDonald admitted, to preferring the now lost way it had previously been sung and expressed a belief that its adaptation to choral performance at Mass had harmed the lullaby significantly.

== Lyricist ==
The words are believed to have been written by Ranald Rankin (c.1785-1863) (Scottish Gaelic: Maighstir Raonall, An t-Urramach Raonall Mac Raing), a Roman Catholic priest from Fort William, Scotland. Like other priests of his generation, Rankin grew up and studied for his vocation covertly, as the Penal Laws were in place. He first attended the secret Lismore Seminary before being sent to continue his studies in Spain at the Royal Scots College in Valladolid.

After his ordination and return to Scotland, Rankin served between 1827 and 1838 among the Catholics of Badenoch. Rankin was transferred to Moidart in 1838.

At Fort William in Moidart, Rankin was documented by the succeeding parish priest, Hugh Chisholm, as having served the parish between 1838 and 25 July 1855. It is believed that the hymn was composed shortly before the latter date.

The hymn is believed to have been composed shortly before Rankin emigrated to Australia and became a missionary at Little River, Victoria. The hymn was originally titled Tàladh ar Slànuighear ('the Lullaby of our Saviour') and sung to a tune called Cumha Mhic Àrois ('the Lament for Mac Àrois').

The lyric appears as item 10 in the University of Glasgow Library's Bàrd na Ceapaich manuscript where it is entitled Taladh ar Slanuighir (Cuimhneachan do Chloinn Mhuideart) which can be translated as 'Our Saviour's Lullaby (Memento to the Children of Moidart)'. The same manuscript again gives the title for the tune as Cumha Mhic Arois ('Lament for Mac Àrois') and supplies the same information regarding the author of the lyric and, presumably, date of publication – An t-Urramach Raonall Mac Raing. An t-8mh Mios, 1855 (Ronald Rankin, August 1855).

Donald MacLean's Typographia Scoto-Gadelica (1915) p329 documents the first publication of the hymn as follows.

RANKIN (Rev. RONALD, R.C), THE SAVIOUR'S LULLABY. 1855. "Taladh Ar Slanuighear. Air Fonn 'Cumha Mhic Arois'" and at the end "Cuimhneachan do Chloinn Mhuideart bho Raonall Mac-Raing. An T-8mh Mios. 1855."' 12mo. 4 pp. These copies were circulated among the Parishioners on the emigration of the Author to Australia.

== Tune ==
"Mac Fir Àrois" (lit. "the son of the Man of Aros" fig. "Son of the Laird of Aros") – i.e. the Tanist of Aros on the Isle of Mull in Scotland – is traditionally held to have drowned in Loch Friosa in Mull.

The Rev. John Gregorson Campbell, states the following. "The heir of Aros, a young man of great personal activity, and, it is said, of dissolute manners, having an opinion of himself that there was no horse he could not ride, was taken by a water-horse into Loch Frisa, a small lake about a mile in length in the north-west of Mull and devoured. This occurred between his espousal and marriage, and the Lament composed by his intended bride is still and deservedly a popular song in Mull. There seems to be this much truth in the story, that the young man was dragged into Loch Frisa by a mare which he was attempting to subdue and drowned. It would appear from the song that his body was recovered."

However, 'Mhic Àrois' appears to be a garbling of a term like 'mac Fir Àrasaig' (son of the Man of Arisaig). The medieval title 'Fear Àrasaig (Laird of Arisaig) belonged to Clan Mackintosh. In p168 of An Gaidheal Vol II (1873), Donald C MacPherson wrote the words for what he titled 'Cumha Mhic a Arois. No Cumha Mhic-an-Tòisich.' ("The Lament for the Son of a-Arois. Or the Lament for Mackintosh".) The lyric he provides is a variant of the lyric for Cumha Mhic an Tòisich but contains a line 'Dheagh mhic a Arois' (Good Son of a-Arois).

The tune of Tàladh ar Slànaigheir bears similarities to the group of songs related to the pipe lament Cumha Mhic an Tòisich (Mackintosh's Lament), which has another alternative title of Cumha Mhic Rìgh Aro (Lament for the Son of the King of Aro). However, these similarities are only in general melodic structure and poetic metre, but not in musical mode or scale. It is therefore possible that the tune used in the Outer Hebrides for Tàladh ar Slànaigheir is a substitute related melody.

In an article tracing the sources of the Gaelic hymns in Allan MacDonald's 1893 Catholic hymnal, John Lorne Campbell states the following concerning the melody of Tàladh ar Slànaigheir, which survived only in the Outer Hebrides, "The tune is said to be "Cumha Mhic Arois" in all these early printed sources, but the hymn is now sung to an air which appears to be derived from the chorus of an old waulking song."

The waulking song melody was identified by Campbell's wife, American ethnomusicologist Margaret Fay Shaw, as An cuala sibh mar dh'éirich dhòmhs.

Recordings exist of two versions of the tune for this.

The variants of the tune of Tàladh ar Slànaigheir differ in mode from each other in a similar fashion to variants of the song Chaidh mo Dhunnchadh dhan Bheinn (my Duncan went to the hill). In the case of both songs, the major third of the scale is weakened in one melodic variant and strengthened in another.

== Lyrics ==
=== Scottish Gaelic ===
The following text is the version published by the Chief of Clan Chisholm, Colin Chisholm (1806–1896), in the Transactions of the Gaelic Society of Inverness Vol XV (1888–89), pp239–242.

p239

TÀLADH AR SLÀNUIGHIR
Air fonn – Cumha Mhic Àrois

Aleluiah, Aleluiah, Aleluiah, Aleluiah.
Mo ghaol, mo ghràdh, a's m' fheudail thu,
M' ionntas ùr a's m' èibhneas thu,
Mo mhacan àlainn ceutach thu,
Chan fhiù mi fhèin bhith 'd dhàil.
Aleluiah, &c.

Ge mòr an t-adhbhar cliù dhomh e,
'S mòr an t-adhbhar cùraim e,
'S mòr an t-adhbhar ùmhlachd e,
Rìgh nan dùl bhith 'm làimh.

Ged is leanabh dìblidh thu,
Cinnteach 's Rìgh nan Rìghrean thu,
'S tu 'n t-oighre dligheach, fìrinneach
Air Rìoghachd Dhé nan gràs.

Ged is Rìgh na glòrach thu
Dhiùlt iad an taigh-òsda dhuit,
Ach chualas ainglean solasach
Toirt glòir don Tì as àird.

Bu mhòr solas agus iongnadh
Buachaillean bochda nan caorach,
Nuair chual' iad na h-ainglean a' glaodhaich,
"Thàinig Slànaighear thun an t-saoghail."

B' e sin an ceòl, 's an naidheachd àghmhor
Sheinn na h-ainglean anns na h-àrdaibh,
Ag innseadh gun d' rugadh Slànaighear
Am Betlehem, am baile Dhaibhidh.

p240

B' e sin sgeula binn nam beannachd,
Mun aoigh a rinn teàrnadh gu talamh,
Chan iongnadh mi bhith mùirneach, geanail.
Is gile na ghrian mo leanabh.

Dh'fhoillsich reulta dha na rìghrean,
Lean iad i mar iùil gu dìleas,
Fhuair iad nam achlais fhèin thu,
Is rinn iad ùmhlachd dhuit gu làr.

Thairg iad òr dhuit, mirr a's tùis,
Thug iad adhradh dhuit is cliù,
B' e turas an àigh don triùir,
Thàinig a shealltainn mo rùin.

Ò na dh'innis aingeal Dé dhuinn
Gun robh 'n fhoill an cridhe Heroid,
Dh'fhalbh sinne leat don Èiphit
Ga sheachnadh mun dèanta beud ort.

Ò! Heroid a chridhe chruaidh,
Cha choisinn d' innleachd dhuit buaidh,
'S lìonar màthair dh’fhàg thu truagh,
'S tu dian an tòir air bàs mo luaidh.

'S fhada, fhada, bho Iudèa,
Tèarainte bho d' chlaidheamh geur e,
Measg nam mac cha d'fhuair thu fhèin e,
'S fallain, slàn thu, 's fàth dhomh èibhneas.

Dh'aindeoin do mhì-rùn] is d' fharmaid,
Bidh mo mhac-sa cliùiteach, ainmeil,
Cha chuir e ùidh an òr n' an airgead,
A rìoghachd cha rìoghachd thalmhaidh.

Gur galach, brònach, tùrsach iad
An-dràst ann an Ierusalem,
A' caoidh nam macan ùra sin,
'S b' e 'n diùbhail 'n cur gu bàs.

Tha Rachel an-diugh fo bhròn,
A' caoidh a pàistean àlainn, òg,
'S frasach air a gruaidh na deòir
Bho nach eil iad aice beò.

p241

Tha mi 'g altrum Righ na mòrachd,
'S mise màthair Dhe na glòire –
Nach buidhe, nach sona dhomhsa,
Tha mo chridhe làn do sholas.

Thàinig, thàinig am Messiah,
Fhuair na fàidhean uile 'n guidhe,
'S fhada bho 'n b' aill leo thu thighinn,
'S àluinn thu air mo ruighe.

A ghnothach gu talamh cha b' fhaoin e,
Cheannach sàbhaladh chloinn daoine,
'S e 'm Fear-réite 's am Fear-saoraidh,
Is e 'n Slànui'ear gràdhach caomh e.

Ciamar a dh'éirich dhomhsa
'Measg an t-sluaigh a bhi cho sònruicht'?
'S e toil a's cumhachd na glòire
Mac bhi agam ge d' is òigh mi.

'S mise fhuair an ulaidh phrìseil,
Ùiseil, uasal, luachmhor, fhìnealt,
'N-diugh cha dual dhomh bhi fo mhì-ghean,
'S coltach ri bruadar an fhirinn.

Cha tuig ainglean naomh no daoine
Gu la deireannach an t-saoghail
Meud do thròcair a's do ghaoil-sa,
Tighinn a ghabhail coluinn daonnda.

Bheir mi moladh, bheir mi adhradh,
Bheir mi cliù dhuit, bheir mi gaol dhuit,
Tha thu agam air mo ghàirdean,
'S mi tha sona thar chloinn daoine.

Mo ghaol an t-sùil a sheallas tlàth,
Mo ghaol an cridh 'tha lìont' le gràdh,
Ged is leanabh thu gun chàil
'S lìonmhor buaidh tha ort a' fàs.

M' ulaidh, m' aighear, a's mo luaidh thu,
Rùn, a's gaol, a's gràdh an t-sluaigh thu;
'S tus' an Tì a bheir dhoibh fuasgladh
Bho chuibhreach an nàmhaid uaibhrich.

p242

'S tu Righ nan righ, 's tu naomh nan naomh,
Dia am Mac thu 's sìorruidh d' aois;
'S tu mo Dhia 's mo leanabh gaoil,
'S tu àrd cheann-feadhna 'chinne-daonn'.

'S tusa grian gheal an dòchais,
Chuireas dorchadas air fògairt;
Bheir thu clann-daoin' bho staid bhrònaich
Gu naomhachd, soilleireachd, a's eòlas.

Thigeadh na slòigh chur ort failte –
Dhèanadh ùmhlachd dhuit mar Shlànui'ear,
Bidh solas mòr am measg sìol Àdhamh –
Thàinig am Fear-saoraidh, thàinig!

Thig a pheacaich, na biodh sgàth ort,
Gheibh thu na dh'iarras tu 'ghràsan;
Ge d' bhiodh do chiontan dearg mar sgàrlaid
Bidh d' anam geal mar shneachd nan àrd-bheann.

Hosanah do Mhac Dhaibhidh,
Mo Righ, mo Thighearna, 's mo Shlànui'ear,
'S mòr mo sholas bhi ga d' thàladh,
'S beannaichte am measg nam mnàith mi.

=== Literal English translation ===
p 239

Hallelujah, Hallelujah, Hallelujah, Hallelujah.
my love, my love and my treasure are You
my treasure and my joy are You
my lovely, becoming son are You
I'm not worthy of being near You

though it's a reason for praise to me
it's a great reason for care
it's a great reason for homage
the King of the Elements being in my arms

though You're a feeble baby
for sure, the King of Kings are You
You're the rightful, true heir
of the Kingdom of God of the graces

though the King of Glory are You
they refused the inn to You
but joyful angels were heard
giving glory to the Highest One

great was the joy and wonder
of the poor shepherds of the sheep
when they heard the angels crying out
"a Saviour has come to the world"

that was the music and the joyous news
that the angels sang in the heights
telling that a Saviour was born
in Bethlehem, in the town of David

p 240

that was the sweet tale of the blessings
about the guest that did descend from heaven
it's no surprise that I'm light and cheerful
fairer/whiter than the sun is my baby

a star manifested for the kings
they followed her like a guide faithfully
they found You in my clasp
and they made obeisance to You [down] to the floor

they offered gold to You, myrrh and incense
they gave adoration to You and praise
that was the journey of joy for the three men
who came to see my dearest

since the angel of God told us
that deceit was in the heart of Herod
we left with You for Egypt
evading him before harm was done to You

O Herod, o hard heart / O Herod of the hard heart
your contrivance will not gain you victory
many the mothers that you left wretched
when you were vehement in pursuit of the death of my dear one

far, far from Judea
safe from your sharp sword is He
among the sons you didn't find Him
You are healthy, whole, and a cause of rejoicing to me

despite your ill-will and your envy
my Son will be renowned, famous
He won't show interest in gold or in silver
His Kingdom tis not an earthly kingdom

wailing, sorrowful, weary are they
now in Jerusalem
lamenting those new sons
their putting to death was a tragedy indeed

Rachel today is sorrowful
lamenting her lovely young child
streaming on her cheek are the tears
since she doesn't have them alive

p 241

I'm rearing the King of Majesty
I'm the mother of the God of Glory
how fortunate, how happy for me
my heart is full of joy

the Messiah has come, has come
all the prophets have got their wish
they've long desired for You to come
You're lovely on my forearm

His business on earth, it isn't futile
to buy the salvation of the children of men
He's the Reconciler and the Redeemer
He is the loving gentle Saviour

how has it happened that I
among the people am so special
it's the will and power of Glory
to have a son though I be a virgin

tis I who have found the priceless treasure
worthy, noble, valuable and fine
today I'm not disposed to be discontent
tis like a dream the truth

neither holy angels nor men will understand
till the last day of the world
the extent of Your mercy and Your love
coming to take a human body

I give you praise, I give you adoration
I give you praise, I give you love
I have you in my arms
tis I who am happy over the children of men

my love the eye that looks mild
my love the heart that is filled with love
though You be a baby without a strong constitution
many are the virtues which on You grow

my treasure, my joy and my dearest are You
my darling and love and love of the people are You
You're the One who brings them liberation
from the bond of the haughty Enemy

p 242

You're the King of Kings, You're the Holy One of the Holy Ones
God the Son are You, eternal is Your age
You're my God and my beloved baby
You're the high chief of the children of men

You're the fair/white sun of hope
who banishes darkness
You bring the children of men from a sorry state
to holiness, illumination and knowledge

the peoples would come to welcome You
they would pay homage to You as Saviour
there will be great joy among the seed of Adam
the Redeemer has come, has come

come, O sinner, do not fear
you'll get what you want of graces
though your faults be red like scarlet
your soul will be white like the snow of the high hills

hosanna to the Son of David
my King, my Lord and my Saviour
great is my joy to be lulling You
blessed among the women am I

== See also ==
- List of Christmas carols

== Video footage ==
- Fiona J. MacKenzie's Rendition
- The Rankin Sisters' Rendition
- Meredith Hall and Le Nef, Montreal, 2004
