= Allan MacDonald (poet) =

Scottish Catholic priest, poet, folklore collector, and activist

The Reverend Allan MacDonald
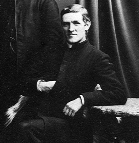
- Church: Latin Church
- Diocese: Argyll and the Isles

Orders
- Ordination: 9 July 1882 by Charles Eyre

Personal details
- Born: 25 October 1859 Fort William, Inverness-shire, Scotland
- Died: 8 October 1905 (aged 45) Eriskay, Scotland

The Reverend Allan MacDonald (Scottish Gaelic: Maighstir Ailein, An t-Athair Ailean Dòmhnallach) (25 October 1859, Fort William – 8 October 1905, Eriskay) was a Scottish Catholic priest and activist during the later phases of the Highland Clearances. He was a religious and secular poet in Scottish Gaelic and a respected folklorist and collector from the oral tradition in the Highlands and Islands.

Born into a middle class family he was raised to only speak English by his parents. While studying for the priesthood, MacDonald chose to also begin studying Gaelic, his ancestral heritage language, and was later to become both a fluent speaker and writer. After ordination MacDonald was assigned to the Diocese of Argyll and the Isles during the final decade of the Highland Clearances. This was during the height of the Highland Land League agitation and MacDonald became inspired by the Irish Land War. Under orders from his bishop, a leading activist for tenant's rights, reasonable rents, security of tenure, free elections, and against religious discrimination that were keeping his parishioners in the Outer Hebrides critically impoverished.

In 1889, MacDonald published a Catholic hymnal of traditional hymns in Gaelic, which is still in use. He died of pneumonia, pleurisy, and influenza in Eriskay at the age of only 45. Celticist Ronald Black wrote that had MacDonald, a pioneer of symbolist and modernist poetry in Gaelic, not died prematurely, "the map of Gaelic literature in the twentieth century might have looked very different."

== Early life ==
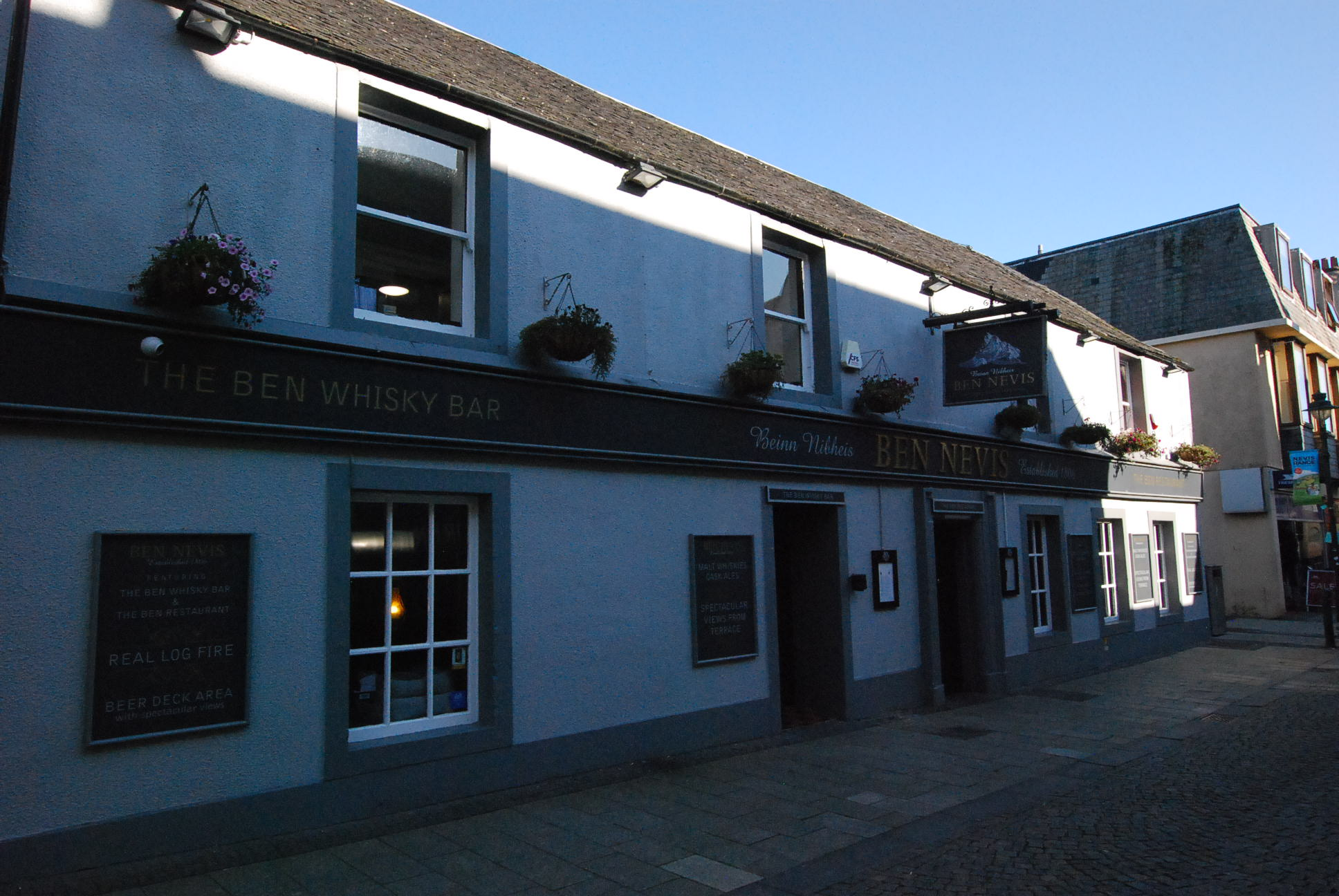
Ben Nevis Inn where Allan MacDonald is believed to have been born

Allan's father, John MacDonald (Scottish Gaelic: Iain Ailein Òg) (1821–1873), was born into a family of carters near Grantown-on-Spey and was employed for many years by the General Post Office as a heavily armed guard, whose orders were to defend the "Marquess of Breadalbane" Royal Mail Coach from highwaymen along the route between Fort William, Glencoe, Blackmount, and Glasgow. After marrying Margaret MacPherson, a Strathspey shepherd's daughter, in Fort William in 1852, John MacDonald saved enough money to buy an inn at 179 High Street in the town. Allan was the third surviving child of his parents and was born in an upper room of his father's inn on 25 October 1859. He was named after his recently deceased paternal grandfather, Allan MacDonald (Scottish Gaelic: Ailein Òg) (1782–1859). MacDonald later recalled how, during his early life, both the town of Fort William and the surrounding countryside had undergone a language shift from Gaelic to Highland English. He accordingly described the Fort William of his childhood as, "half Lowland and half Highland." According to Roger Hutchinson, MacDonald's later statements about the complete Anglicisation of Fort William during his childhood were an exaggeration. Census records from the era reveal that 70% of Fort William's population reported the ability to speak both the English and Gaelic languages. However, English was the language of commerce and was seen as a means of future advancement so John and Margaret MacDonald, being innkeepers, had made a choice to teach only English to their children.

MacDonald's lifelong fascination with the Scottish folklore of the Highlands and Islands, an interest his father also shared, began as a child in Fort William. He believed as a child in local stories about the each-uisge, or "water horse", of nearby Loch Linnhe, whose back could magically expand in order to accommodate all the children who wished to ride him. But then, the water-horse would gallop off into the nearest lake to drown and eat the children on his back. MacDonald later recalled, "Many's the horse I wouldn't get on as a child for fear it would be the each-uisge." MacDonald's lifelong passion for the Scottish traditional music played upon the Great Highland bagpipe also dates from his childhood in Fort William. He told his friend Frederick Rea "that he was born at the foot of Ben Nevis so his love of the traditional pipes was not to be wondered at. I noted how his eyes lighted up at the music of a strathspey, and, at a pibroch, his rugged, weather-beaten countenance became suffused with colour and he drew himself to his full six feet height at its warlike strains."

== Seminary studies ==
=== Blairs College ===
On 15 August 1871, 12-year old Allan MacDonald entered the minor seminary at Blairs College in Aberdeen. At the time he arrived, he spoke only English. Both living conditions and discipline were very spartan at Blairs College during the 1870s. So much so, that MacDonald often said in later years that, after what he had experienced at Blairs College, all the hardships of being a priest in the Outer Hebrides looked luxurious by comparison. MacDonald would maintain, "a cordial dislike", of the Blairs College rector, Peter Joseph Grant, for the remainder of his life. His other instructors included James A. Smith, the future Archbishop of St Andrews and Edinburgh. The main linguistic focus was upon the study of Ecclesiastical Latin. Seminarians who wished to also learn Gaelic, were given Ewen MacEachen's Gaelic dictionary and his literary translation of Thomas a Kempis's Imitatio Christi as textbooks. They were then encouraged to pursue their study of Gaelic on their own time. Other languages that were taught included French, Spanish, and Italian, which were intended to prepare the seminarians at Blairs for further studies at the Scots Colleges in Paris, Douai, Rome, and Valladolid. Geography was also taught using a globe, as were, "philosophy in all its branches", and theology.

Both of MacDonald's parents died during his studies at Blairs College. Iain Ailein Òg died at his Fort William hotel of tuberculosis and chronic gastritis on 25 March 1873. He was only 58 years old. His widow, 45-year old Margaret MacPherson MacDonald, also died at Fort William of pulmonary congestion on 20 December 1875. The surviving MacDonald siblings immediately left home and dispersed. 12-year old Elizabeth "Lizzie" MacDonald was taken in by her maternal great-uncle Alexander MacIntosh, who had similarly taken in her fatherless mother three decades earlier. After completing school in Fort William, Elizabeth MacDonald joined her older sister Charlotte MacDonald as a domestic servant in Glasgow. Their teenaged brother Ronald MacDonald moved to Glenshiel in Lochalsh, where he began working as a hired farm hand.

=== Valladolid ===
In September 1876, MacDonald was advised by his professors to continue his training at the Royal Scots College in Madrid. He began the journey to Spain shortly before his seventeenth birthday and arrived at Valladolid after a railway journey via Paris and Bordeaux. According to John Lorne Campbell, "At Valladolid there were several Highland students and they used to produce a holograph Gaelic magazine, of which at least one copy has been preserved. MacDonald contributed to this, apparently under several pseudonyms, for his handwriting appears frequently in the surviving copy."

In March 1882, a 22-year old MacDonald returned to Scotland after five years in Spain. MacDonald would always look back with fondness on his years of seminary studies in Spain and composed a Gaelic poem Rannan do Mgr Mac an Tòisich ("Verses to Fr John MacIntosh of Bornish") on his time there.

=== Ordination ===
Following his return, MacDonald's examiners reported to Archbishop Charles Eyre that they were, "well satisfied, not only with his theoretical knowledge, but also with the prudence and good sense with which he applies this knowledge to particular cases." Allan MacDonald was, in the words of rector David MacDonald, "without any canonical impediment, except want of age." Allan MacDonald was accordingly ordained to the priesthood at St Andrew's Cathedral, Glasgow by Archbishop Eyre on 9 July 1882.

== Career ==
=== Priestly ministry in Oban ===
After his ordination, Archbishop Eyre offered Allan MacDonald a teaching position at Blairs College, which the latter declined. He was then assigned instead as assistant Rector of St Columba's Cathedral in Oban, which was a temporary wooden pro-cathedral located on the site of the modern Cathedral Hall. MacDonald immediately developed a close and long-term friendship with Bishop Angus MacDonald of the Catholic Diocese of Argyll and the Isles. According to John Lorne Campbell, "The only Catholic family then living in the town of Oban itself was that of Donald McLeod, a native of the Isle of Eigg, and from Donald McLeod Allan recovered traditional hymns, some of which were later printed in the hymn book he published in 1893. This was the beginning of an interest in oral tradition to which Allan applied his energies in his spare time for the next seventeen years, taking down the traditional Gaelic oral lore, prayers, hymns, songs, stories, place names, customs and history, whenever he got the chance." By 1884, MacDonald's grasp of Gaelic was at last termed adequate enough. After again declining the offer of a faculty position at Blairs College, a 24-year-old Allan MacDonald was assigned to a parish in the Outer Hebrides and crossed The Minch.

=== South Uist ===
He was then assigned to St Peter's Catholic Church in Daliburgh, on the Isle of South Uist which, according to John Lorne Campbell, was "the most populous, as well as the poorest, island in the Diocese of Argyll and the Isles", which, according to Roger Hutchinson, was "the most impoverished Diocese in Britain." According to John Lorne Campbell, "Dalibrog in those days could only be reached by steamer from Oban or Glasgow – a full day's sail in the first case. Here Allan landed in July 1884. His congregation was one living on the very margin of existence. Nearly all the best land in the island had been taken, within the preceding three generations, for big sheep farms, and the people had either been evicted or forced, in many cases, to occupy miserable holdings near the shore with a view to pursuing the kelp or fishing industries, the first of which had long ago failed, while very few of them had enough capital to pursue the fishing." Upon his arrival, Allan MacDonald was mentored in both the local Gaelic dialect and local customs for Catholic feast days by Alexander Campbell, a retired priest resident at St. Peter's rectory.

MacDonald demanded greater rights for the impoverished crofters who were his parishioners. MacDonald also began urging his parishioners to vote against the candidates favored by Lady Cathcart and her estate factor. This was a task which required great tact and, according to Campbell, it is telling that the Protestants of South Uist still speak very highly of Allan MacDonald. Even so, tensions ran high. As a result of wider political changes in the late 19th century, the lives of MacDonald's parishioners began to improve markedly, as crofters finally felt able to build more secure and cozy houses and grow more productive and profitable crops without risking drastic increases in rent.

=== School board member ===
Macdonald was elected to the schoolboard of the area but "often had to walk for hours in bad weather to preach, make sick calls, or visit the nine schools under his care as chairman of the school board." Frederick Rea also recalled in his memoirs that at this time, MacDonald had a passion for local prehistoric archaeology and had an impressive private collection of stone-age artifacts from sites around the island. According to John Lorne Campbell, MacDonald's notebooks reveal a great deal about the contents of his library. He owned rare early editions of the poetry of Alasdair Mac Mhaighstir Alasdair, John MacCodrum, and Allan MacDougall. He also owned the Scottish Gaelic dictionaries of Alexander MacBain and MacEachan, as well as Duncan Campbell's 1798 Gaelic Songs and Stewart's 1804 collection of Gaelic songs. He further owned an edition of The Fate of the Children of Lir published by the Society for the Preservation of the Irish Language and a copy of Sàr Obair nam Bàrd Gàidhealach by literary scholar John Mackenzie. According to Ronald Black, "The 1891 census finds Allan, aged 31, living in his eight-roomed presbytery in Daliburgh, with the retired FAlexander Campbell, aged 72, a native of South Uist who appears to have inspired Allan to make his folklore collections, and whose valuable notes on the island's religious traditions are preserved today in Canna House. With them in the presbytery are his housekeeper, Catherine (Kate) Campbell, aged 23 and unmarried, and a housemaid, Rachel Morrison, aged 21 and unmarried. The priests are listed as speaking Gaelic and English, the servants Gaelic only."

=== Illness and Eriskay ===
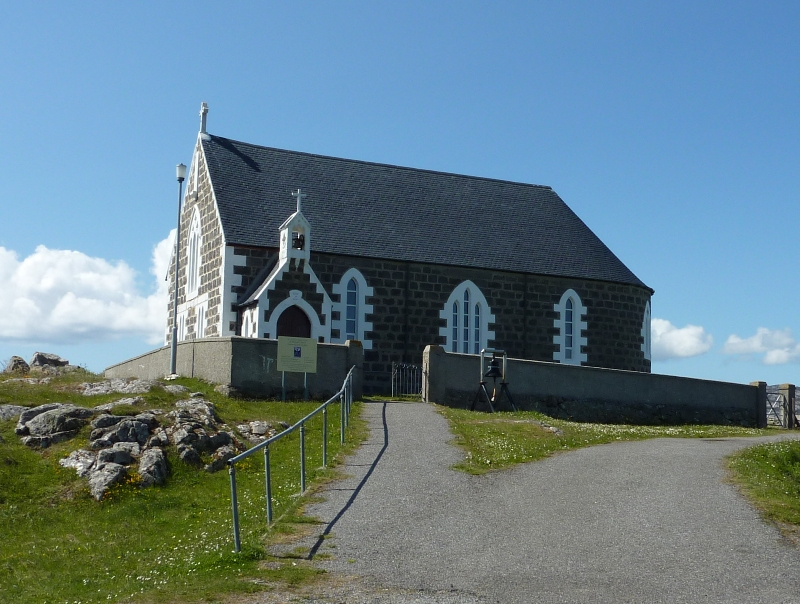
St. Michael's Catholic Church upon Cnoc nan Sgrath, as it appears today.

After hearing that John Crichton-Stuart, 3rd Marquess of Bute, had recently paid for the building of a tin tabernacle as the new St Columba's Cathedral in Oban, MacDonald and John Mackintosh, who both knew that Lady Cathcart could not be counted upon, recommended that bishop Angus MacDonald ask the marquess to build a new and badly needed hospital upon South Uist. He agreed and "the Bute hospital", was soon constructed near Lochboisdale. Macdonald fell seriously ill at one point. In January 1893, after a doctor warned that further extension could prematurely kill him, MacDonald was offered by the new bishop of Argyll and the Isles, George Smith, a town parish on the mainland, "with better living and the company of book-learned men." MacDonald politely declined and instead requested to be permanently reassigned to St. Michael's Church on Eriskay. A few months later, the new Hospital of the Sacred Heart, which MacDonald and Mackintosh had covertly arranged for Bute to finance and build, opened its doors on South Uist. One South Uist protestant later told John Lorne Campbell that MacDonald was, "the best clergyman South Uist had ever had" and that he, "did the work of four." The grateful parishioners of St Peter's took up a collection and, in January 1894, gave their former pastor a presentation clock as a gift for in his new manse in Eriskay.

Campbell writes of his time on Eriskay, "To answer a sick call on Eriskay Allan had to walk six or seven miles, often in the rain, to Eriskay Sound and there make a fire on the shore so that the Eriskay boatmen would know to sail over and fetch him. On one of these crossings he was in danger of being drowned." The location along the coast at Kilbride where Allan's signal bonfires were lit is still referred to upon South Uist as, "The Priest's Point."

In January 1893, to assist his recovery after the epidemic, MacDonald was permanently assigned to Eriskay which he immortalised in his poem, Eilein na h-Òige (Isle of Youth). He oversaw the construction of a new parish church, upon "Cnoc nan Sgrath, which dominates the western side of the island and has a view looking southward over the Sound of Barra and northward to South Uist", and an adjacent rectory. MacDonald "sold his Gaelic manuscripts, the fruit of more than 20 years of collecting" to give the proceeds to the parish building fund. To general rejoicing upon Eriskay, the church was consecrated on 7 May 1903 by Bishop George Smith, and dedicated to St Michael the archangel, the patron saint of the Outer Hebrides.

== Death ==
However, MacDonald was to die a few months later. According to his death certificate at the General Register Office in Edinburgh, Maighstir Ailein died of pneumonia, pleurisy, and influenza in the bed of his Rectory at 1 o'clock am on 8 October 1905. His younger brother, Ronald MacDonald, who had recently come over from his farm in Glenshiel, was present at his passing. A Tridentine Requiem Mass was offered for his soul at St. Michael's Church by Allan MacDonald's first cousin, Canon Alexander MacKintosh (1853–1922), and was attended by 21 priests, many of Allan MacDonald's friends, and the whole population of the island. MacDonald had already chosen a cemetery plot for himself near the church and facing the Sound of Barra, cleared it of nettles, and fenced the plot off with driftwood. He had said, "Let me be buried amongst my dead and near to my living people, that I may be near them, and that they and I may rise together on Judgment Day." After the Requiem, MacDonald's coffin was carried from An Rubha Bàn to the cemetery plot he had chosen. One of the attendees later recalled that it was the last funeral in which the tradition of Keening, or Coronach, was used in the Hebrides. After MacDonald's coffin was lowered into the ground, the weeping Catholics of Eriskay pushed aside the gravediggers and personally refilled the grave themselves by each picking up handfuls of soil at a time.

Aside from his younger brother Ronald, Allan MacDonald was also survived by his two married younger sisters, Mrs. Charlotte McHardy of Helensburgh, the wife of a policeman, and Mrs. Elizabeth MacInnes of Anderston. According to a 14 October 1905 report in the Glasgow Observer, all three surviving siblings were present in Eriskay for MacDonald's Requiem Mass and burial. By the 1930s, Elizabeth MacInnes' daughter, Margaret "Meg" MacInnes, had become well known as a Gaelic traditional singer. Until her death c.1947, MacInnes regularly visited Eriskay, where she was locally regarded as MacDonald's heir. In addition to offering the Requiem Mass, Canon MacKintosh wrote and published an obituary for his late cousin, "which has provided the basis for all subsequent biography."

In 1909, a Celtic High cross was dedicated at Allan MacDonald's grave in St Michael's parish cemetery. Since July 2001, a mile-long causeway has crossed the Sound of Barra between Eriskay and South Uist, which can be easily driven across, rather than having to be, as in MacDonald's lifetime, crossed by small and easily capsized fishing boats. The site of the 1852 stone and thatch chapel where MacDonald first offered Mass during his earliest visits to Eriskay is now a Marian shrine where a statue of Our Lady of Fatima stands overlooking the Sound of Barra.

== Folklore, dictionary, and folksong collections ==
=== The hymnal ===
MacDonald began collecting folklore when he was assigned to Oban shortly after his ordination. From Donald MacLeod, a fisherman and parishioner of St Columba's Cathedral from the Isle of Eigg, MacDonald collected multiple Catholic hymns in Scottish Gaelic. He supplemented these with several of his own compositions and translations and anonymously published a Gaelic hymnal in 1893.

=== The dictionary ===
MacDonald's notebooks also included a detailed dictionary of Scottish Gaelic terms that were in serious danger of permanently falling out of use and having their traditional meanings forgotten. MacDonald's library included many rare volumes of Celtic mythology, Scottish Gaelic folksong collections, and 17th and 18th century Bardic poetry, which he had realized were often filled with words and expressions that did not appear and were not defined in any existing Scottish Gaelic dictionary. MacDonald had an advantage over anyone who sought to learn these words and expressions today, as many of his parishioners were elderly Gaelic-monoglot-speakers who had been born before the 1815 Battle of Waterloo and who had personally lived through the Highland Clearances. As a result, MacDonald often asked these elderly tradition bearers to clarify the meaning of words and expressions that had gone out of use, and then wrote careful and detailed definitions in his notebooks, while also writing down the names of his informants.

Writing in 1953, John Lorne Campbell had very high praise for MacDonald's work as a lexicographer, "Every aspect of Hebridean life is illustrated by this collection. From it can be obtained an idea of the vivid, concrete and epigrammatical speech of nineteenth-century Hebridean Gaelic-speakers, of their customs, habits and work, of their strong religious sense and their keen observation of the animals and plants around them; from it can be gained an insight into the wealth of folklore and oral tradition which the Gaels preserved in spite of poverty, oppression and the official persecution of their language, the tradition which lay behind their thoughts and provided so many allusions in their everyday conversation." With the help of multiple typists, Campbell edited the dictionary for publication by, among other things, putting the entries into alphabetical order. The first edition of the dictionary was published in Dublin in 1958 and has since been described as an invaluable resource for Celtic studies, the Scottish Gaelic language, and its literature. During an interview in the 2010s, Catriona Black commented about the resulting dictionary, "I love the words. They are really beautiful and refer to really specific incidents. They can be quite daft - there is a sense of humour there. They often gently mock people."

=== The notebooks ===
Following his assignment to St. Peter's Church in South Uist, MacDonald's mentor, Alexander Campbell (1820-1893), urged him to continue his collecting work and to pay close attention to the Hebridean mythology and folklore of South Uist. Campbell, who had assisted legendary folklorist Alexander Carmichael collect what was published in Carmina Gadelica, often used to tell Allan MacDonald, "My boy, when you've ploughed what I've harrowed, you'll believe more things." According to John Lorne Campbell, "His folklore collections, much of which have still to be published, run to hundreds of thousands of words, probably the greatest collection of folklore connected with one definite locality ever made by one person. He enjoyed the friendship and respect of many noted scholars in Scotland and Ireland who did not hesitate to ask him frequently the kind of questions that can only be answered by the man on the spot. He left, amongst other things, a vocabulary of South Uist Gaelic and a short diary in Gaelic, which has been printed in the quarterly magazine Gairm, and many original poems." MacDonald was eventually regarded as such a recognized expert in the field, that his opinion and advice were sought by letter by Walter Blaikie, by Alexander and Ella Carmichael, George Henderson, William MacKenzie, and Neil Munro.

=== Strange Things ===
MacDonald's notebook titled "Strange Things" supplied the vast majority of the fieldwork that was published by Ada Goodrich Freer, who was commissioned to investigate Hebridean mythology and folklore about second sight by the Society for Psychical Research in 1894–1895. Goodrich Freer deliberately distorted the materials in MacDonald's notebook to fit her preconceived agenda and then published them under own name, in the journal Folklore. She gave almost no credit to MacDonald, for which she received very harsh criticism from both Dr. George Henderson and Alexander Carmichael. After the posthumous recovery of MacDonald's diary and notebooks, John Lorne Campbell also became aware who had supplied almost all of Goodrich Freer's research, without the proper credit or acknowledgement. According to Ray Perman, "Reading through the diaries, John found several references to work Allan was doing to provide material for Miss Freer's lectures, sometimes working late to meet her deadlines at the expense of his own failing health. With painstaking thoroughness, John and Sheila Lockett went through Ada Goodrich Freer's lectures, papers, and book and compared them against Allan's notebooks. They discovered at least two dozen instances of outright plagiarism, sometimes of extensive passages with only small changes of words. Sometimes she blatantly misrepresented his findings. To support her argument that 'second sight' existed on the islands, she reproduced his retellings of folk memories as if they had happened recently. Where he added qualifications, she substituted certainties." When John Lorne Campbell went public with a 1958 article published by the University of Edinburgh, Campbell's findings were, "not universally well-received. Despite the evidence, some academics and folklorists believed that John had overstepped the bonds of decency in attacking the reputation of a dead women. He countered by arguing that only be destroying Miss Freer's reputation could he rescue that of Allan, whose notes had been plundered to such an extent that the publication of his own work had been stifled. To add insult to injury, Miss Freer had claimed copyright of the material in her book and papers."

== Original literary work ==
=== Religious poetry ===
MacDonald's poetry is mainly Christian poetry, as would be expected from one of his calling. He composed Scottish Gaelic Christmas carols, hymns and verse in honour of the Blessed Virgin, the Christ Child, and the Blessed Sacrament. In many of his Christmas poems, however, MacDonald points out that the Christ child came to earth and was not greeted by joyfulness, but by religious persecution and hatred by the human race.

MacDonald also translated the Tridentine Mass and Christian Latin literature into Gaelic verse; including Thomas of Celano's Dies irae, Stabat Mater, Ave Maris Stella, A solis ortus cardine, Te lucis ante terminum, and Salve Regina.

MacDonald's original religious poetry was also made as an effort to fill gaps in the oral tradition of the Outer Hebrides. MacDonald was told that a catechism in Gaelic oral poetry had been routinely memorized before Catholic emancipation in 1829 by the children of South Uist. As no one could be found who could still recite the missing catechism to him from memory, MacDonald decided to recreate it instead of transcribing it. He accordingly composed a series of "didactic hymns", which are both a translation into Gaelic and a versification of A Catechism of Christian Doctrine, the famous "Penny Catechism" by Bishop Richard Challoner. While composing the song-poem An Eaglais ("The Church"), MacDonald drew upon the ancient metaphor of the Catholic Church as the Barque of St. Peter, adapted it to the culture of the Outer Hebrides, and reimagined Jesus Christ as a Hebridean shipwright. Furthermore, MacDonald, who was always interested in adapting the traditions of Gaelic oral literature to religious instruction, composed this poem after the style of a Waulking song.

=== Secular poetry ===
Several secular poems and songs were also composed by him. For example, in his iconic song poem Eilein na h-Òige ("Island of the Young"), MacDonald praises the beauty of Eriskay, its wildlife, and the fondness of its people for telling tales from the Fenian Cycle of Celtic mythology inside the ceilidh house. He also commented upon the visits to Eriskay by Saint Columba, Iain Mùideartach, Chief of Clanranald, and Prince Charles Edward Stuart. MacDonald also denounced the Highland Clearances upon the island, but expressed joy that the crofters had been granted greater rights against the landlords.

In his comic verse drama, Parlamaid nan Cailleach ("The Parliament of Hags"), however, MacDonald lampoons the backbiting and gossiping of elderly female Gaels and local courtship and marriage customs. Ronald Black has compared the resulting comedy of manners to similar works of comic poetry from Irish literature in the Irish language, such as Domhnall Ó Colmáin's 1670 Párliament na mBan ("The Women's Parliament") and Brian Merriman's 1780 Cúirt an Mheán Oíche ("The Midnight Court"). In Modern literature in Irish, a more recent prose parallel may be seen in the iconic 1949 comic novel Cré na Cille ("Graveyard Clay") by Máirtín Ó Cadhain.

Allan MacDonald's poem Banais nan Cambeulach ("The Campbell Wedding"), was composed about the 7 February 1899 marriage of his housekeeper, Kate Campbell, to crofter and fisherman Donald Campbell (Scottish Gaelic: Dòmhnall mac Alastair). MacDonald irately skewers Clan Campbell for slaughtering his kinfolk during the Massacre of Glencoe and for repeatedly siding against the House of Stuart during the Jacobite risings. He also compared Donald Campbell's marrying his housekeeper to the centuries-old Clan Campbell tradition of cattle raiding, the aftermath of which often left MacDonald's Clan Donald ancestors similarly destitute.

Despite their longstanding friendship and shared enthusiasm for conversing together about the great figures of Scottish Gaelic literature, MacDonald also poked fun in at least two surviving poems at Eriskay postmaster and Seanchaidh Dugald MacMillan (Scottish Gaelic: Dùbhgall mac Thormoid). They are his satire of local Samhain customs, An Gaisgeach fo Uidheamh Réitich ("The Hero Equipped for Bethrothal"), and Luinneag an Amadain Bhig ("The Lay of the Little Fool"), which is also a parody of the cliches of epic poetry from the Fenian Cycle of Celtic Mythology by reducing the size of its warrior protagonist to that of Tom Thumb.

During the Boer War, MacDonald composed several poems that similarly poked fun at Afrikaner nationalist statesman Paul Kruger, the President of the Republic of Transvaal, with which the British Empire and the Commonwealth of Nations were both at war.

Even though he never lived to see it, MacDonald's Ceum nam Mìltean ("The March of Thousands"), which describes waking up from a nightmare and feeling a sense of foreboding and gloom about thousands of men marching away to a conflict they will never return from, has been called an eerily prophetic work of war poetry about the loss of an entire generation in the trenches of the First World War.

In the poem Am Bàs ("Death"), Allan MacDonald pondered the shortness of life's span, the inevitability of mortality, and how very often death calls upon us unexpectedly. This remains a very popular and oft-recited poem. Allan MacDonald's biographer John Lorne Campbell quoted that very poem when referring to the poet-priest's own death. Decades later, John Lorne Campbell's own biographer, Ray Perman, quoted the exact same poem in the context of Campbell's death in 1996.

According to Ronald Black, MacDonald's secular and comic poetry was never intended to see publication and was only composed, because, "my conclusions are that, as I remarked earlier, Allan suffered from an extraordinary poetic demon struggling to get out; that just as he never actually delivered Banais nan Caimbeulach at the Campbell Wedding, he probably never revealed Luinneag an Amadain Bhig to its target, but kept it well-hidden in his notebook; and that effusions such as these were symptoms of a major poet in the making. They may have come involuntarily to Allan in a state of sleep, or between sleeping and waking (perhaps on his sickbed)... An inveterate scribbler, he would have been unable to resist the temptation to write them down. These two poems have nothing to do with social or moral control, over himself or anyone else; they simply represent the bubbling and steaming of a huge literary talent, spilling over and lifting the lid of the pot. Had Father Allan lived out his threescore years and ten, then, the map of Gaelic literature in the twentieth century might have looked very different."

== Legacy ==
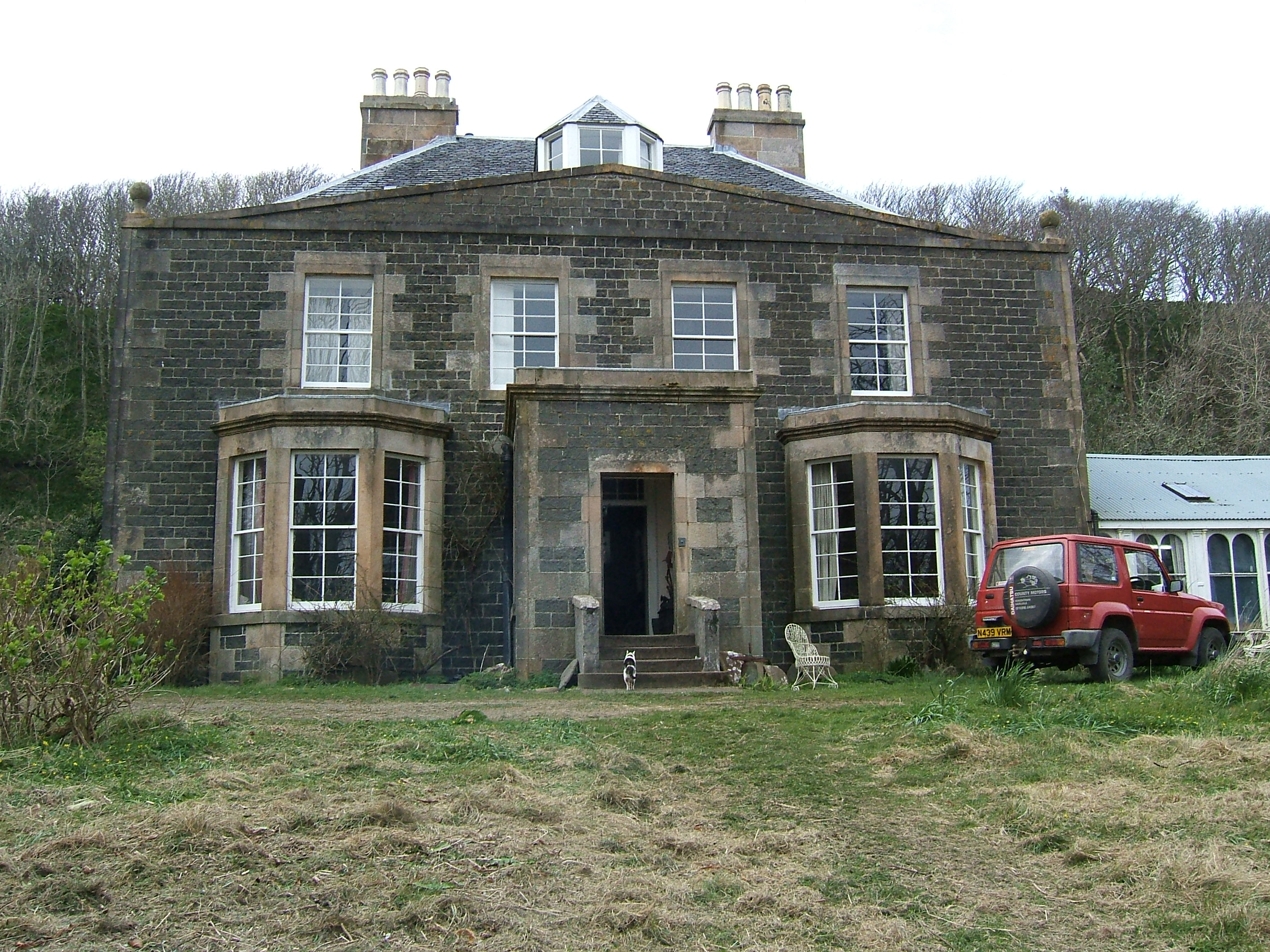
Canna House, where John Lorne Campbell and Margaret Fay Shaw's private archive of Scottish Gaelic literature, history, and folklore is preserved.

Amy Murray's memoir of their friendship, Father Allan's Island, was published with a preface by Padraic Colum in 1920. According to Ray Perman, "Written in an odd - some would say irritating - folksy style, her book was nevertheless an affectionate and not inaccurate portrait of Allan and life on Eriskay at the beginning at the beginning of the twentieth century. It enjoyed considerable success in the United States..." The primary credit for rescuing Allan MacDonald from obscurity and restoring both his reputation and importance to Scottish Gaelic literature, must go to Margaret Fay-Shaw's husband, literary scholar and Scottish nationalist John Lorne Campbell. Campbell's research into MacDonald began in 1936, after being asked by Outlook magazine to review the second edition of musicologist Amy Murray's memoir Father Allan's Island. Campbell, despite having been raised in the Scottish Episcopal Church, "was very drawn to Father Allan", about whom he heard very high praise from residents of South Uist, Eriskay, and Barra who had known him. With the help of various friends and the universities of Glasgow and Edinburgh, Campbell succeeded in tracking down the poetry manuscripts, diaries, and detailed folklore collections of Allan MacDonald, which had been missing and presumed lost since his death in 1905. As word spread, others shared surviving letters to and from MacDonald. Further detailed research by Campbell about MacDonald's life, times, and writings, as well as his diary, was similarly collected and housed at Canna, in the Inner Hebrides of Scotland. The first collection of MacDonald's Gaelic verse, Bàrdachd Mghr Ailein: The Gaelic Poems of Fr Allan McDonald of Eriskay (1859–1905), was self published by John Lorne Campbell in 1965. In 1966, future Gaelic literary scholar Ronald Black received a suitcase full of Gaelic books from Dr. Campbell and brought them to Eriskay for sale aboard a ferry from Ludag, South Uist. At the time, Eriskay still had many Scottish Gaelic monoglot speakers who had known MacDonald personally. Black has since recalled that the poetry book and Campbell's "little blue biography of Father Allan", both accordingly, "sold like hotcakes".

At the urging of Ferdi McDermott of Saint Austin Press, an expanded and bilingual anthology of the priest's Gaelic verse, both religious and secular, was edited by Ronald Black and was published in 2002 by Mungo Books, which was then the Scottish imprint of Saint Austin Press. Ronald Black commented, however, that so much of MacDonald's poetry remains unpublished that the Mungo Books edition could easily have been twice as long. For example, MacDonald's Ecclesiastical Latin to Scottish Gaelic literary translation of the Compline service from the Roman Breviary, the manuscript of which John Lorne Campbell located in the possession of Canon William MacMaster at Fort William in 1950, remains unpublished.

Comann Eachdraidh Eirisgeidh ("The Eriskay Historical Society") was established in 2010 and, as of 2021, had recently purchased the island's schoolhouse, which had been closed down since 2013, to turn it into a local history and heritage museum. In honour of Allan MacDonald and his importance to Scottish Gaelic literature, Comann Eachdraidh Eirisgeidh has also established "Maighstir Ailein's Poetry Trail", a hiking trail where particularly scenic locations are accompanied by bilingual and laminated pages in boxes from the priest-poet's famous poem, Eilein na h-Òige ("Isle of Youth").

== In popular culture ==
- Allan MacDonald was the inspiration for the character of MacCrimmon in Frederic Breton's 1893 novel A Heroine in Homespun and also for Ludovic in Neil Munro's 1903 novel Children of the Tempest.
- South Uist vocalist Kathleen MacInnes performed Allan MacDonald's literary translation of Frederick William Faber's Marian hymn "O Purest of Creatures", Reul Àlainn a' Chuain on YouTube, on her 2006 album Summer Dawn.
- In June 2021, vocalist Fergus Munro sang and recorded Allan MacDonald's Laoidh mun Nollaig, a Hiberno-Latin to Scottish Gaelic literary translation of the 450 AD Christmas carol A solis ortus cardine by Coelius Sedulius. Ronald Black has written of the same setting, "[T]he Gaelic text is very skillfully constructed to match the stresses of the Latin chant [...] It is hard to think of anyone today who would have enough knowledge of Gaelic, Latin and music to do anything similar."

== Published works ==
- Published anonymously (1889), Laoidhean Caitliceach airson Chloine, Oban, republished 1936.
- Published anonymously (1893), Comh-Chruinneachadh de Laoidhean Spioradail, Oban. Contains Gaelic hymns, like Tàladh Chrìosda, which were collected from the oral tradition, as well as original hymns and literary translations by MacDonald.
- Collected by Allan MacDonald (1958, 1972, 1991), Gaelic Words from South Uist and Eriskay – Edited, Dublin Institute for Advanced Studies. Second edition with supplement, published by the Oxford University Press. [CH2/1/1/13]
- Edited and transcribed by John Lorne Campbell (1965), Bàrdachd Mhgr Ailein: The Gaelic Poems of Fr Allan McDonald of Eriskay (1859–1905), T & A. Constable, Edinburgh. [CH2/1/1/13]
- Eilein na h-Òige; The Poems of Fr. Allan MacDonald, Edited by Ronald Black, Mungo Books, Glasgow, 2002.
