= John Lorne Campbell =

Scottish historian (1906–1996)

John Lorne Campbell FRSE LLD OBE (Scottish Gaelic: Iain Latharna Caimbeul) (1 October 1906 – 25 April 1996) was a Scottish historian, farmer, environmentalist and folklorist, and recognized scholar of both Celtic studies and Scottish Gaelic literature. Along with his wife, American ethnomusicologist Margaret Fay Shaw, Campbell helped lay the foundation for both the modern Scottish Gaelic Renaissance and heritage language revival using Scottish Gaelic-medium education.

== Early life ==
Inverneill House.

According to his biographer, Ray Perman, the family of John Lorne Campbell claimed descent from the Clan Campbell tacksmen of Craignish (Scottish Gaelic: Mac Dúbhghaill Creaginnis, Clan Tearlach), through a son of disinherited 16th century heir Tearlach Mòr. According to Penman, however, there is no documentary proof that the son of Tearlach Mòr ever existed.

The family is known, however, to have risen from modest beginnings due to the successful career "in trade" and in the British Army of General Sir Archibald Campbell, by whom the family estate at Inverneill was originally purchased, during both the Seven Years' War and the American War of Independence. Despite his own descent from the General's younger brother Duncan, John Lorne Campbell always referred to Sir Archibald in later years as his "honoured ancestor" and kept a portrait of him hanging inside Canna House. Sir Archibald's silver teapot was similarly kept permanently displayed on the mantlepiece of Canna House, next to the teapot of the General's wartime enemy, Vermont Patriot Colonel Ethan Allen, which Campbell's wife, American ethnomusicologist Margaret Fay Shaw, had inherited from her own family.

Campbell was born in an Edinburgh nursing home on 1 October 1906, but taken almost immediately to Inverneill House on the west shore of Loch Fyne, Argyll, Scotland. His father was Lieutenant Colonel Duncan Campbell, 8th of Inverneill (1880-1954) (called "Young Inverneill", to differentiate him from his father, who shared the same first name and military rank). His mother was Ethel Harriet Waterbury, a wealthy and cultured American heiress, from Morristown, New Jersey, whom Lt.-Col. Campbell had married in 1905 to bolster the estate's "flagging finances".

In contrast to his family's tenants, who were mainly Gaelic-speaking Catholics and Presbyterians who attended religious services in nearby Tayvallich, Campbell was raised in the Scottish Episcopal Church and given a staunchly Unionist upbringing within the Scottish landed gentry of Argyllshire. Campbell later recalled that his family, like the other High Tory landowners of Argyll, felt a deep sympathy for the Anglo-Irish landlords and accordingly watched with horror the events of the Land War, the Easter Rising of 1916, and the Irish War of Independence.

He was educated at Cargilfield School in Edinburgh and then Rugby in England.

As he was expected to inherit the family estate, Campbell's coming of age in 1927 was celebrated with a feast and formal dance inside the massive stone barn at Taynish House. Campbell's Aunt Olive was in charge of organizing the party and invited not only friends and relatives, but also the estate tenants, most of whom her nephew had never met before. The tenants had secretly taken up a collection and gave Campbell a gold pocket watch and a pair of cufflinks. In return, Campbell recited a few words of Gaelic that he had learned for the occasion, "Tha mi gle thoilichte a bhith comhla ribha nochd." ("I am very pleased to be with you tonight.") Campbell was deeply touched by the warm response these words received.

== Scottish nationalist ==
Beginning in 1926, Campbell's interest in learning his heritage language was piqued during a visit to the Highland Games in Oban, where he overheard a conversation in Gaelic between four men from the Hebrides. Campbell later recalled, "I had never heard Gaelic spoken like that and I said to myself, 'That's something I should have!'"

Later that year, Campbell began attending St John's College, Oxford, studying Rural Economy with a minor in Celtic studies. The study of Rural Economy was intended to help Campbell learn how to profitably manage his future inheritance, but in 1928, Campbell learned to his horror and devastation that the Inverneill estate was being sold. Even though this was the only way to cover his father's considerable debts, both the Argyllshire gentry and Campbell himself would always view the sale as proof that his father lacked confidence in his ability to successfully manage the estate. Campbell would always treasure the gold watch and cuff links given by the Inverneill tenants at his coming of age party as a reminder of what might have been.

Campbell graduated in 1929 and receiving an MA in 1933. During this time, Prof John Fraser engendered a strong love of the Scottish Gaelic language and Scottish folklore. In the Oxford Gaelic Society, which Campbell also belonged to during the 1920s and early '30s, the 17th century Classical Gaelic literary language was taught by reading the Irish bardic poetry collection Foras Feasa ar Éirinn by Fr. Geoffrey Keating, while the Scottish Gaelic vernacular was taught using the prose collection Caraid nan Gàidheal by Rev. Dr. Norman MacLeod.

In 1933, Campbell published the groundbreaking book Highland Songs of the Forty-Five, consisting of 32 Gaelic song-poems that he had tracked down with Prof. Fraser's assistance in both the Bodleian Library and the British Museum. These were analyzed for political content and published with facing translations into English blank verse, or unrhymed iambic pentameter. At the time, the real cultural, political, and religious reasons for the Jacobite rising of 1745 had been obscured by the novels of Sir Walter Scott and Robert Louis Stevenson, who both depicted, "the Highlander as a romantic hero fighting for a lost cause." In response, Campbell set out to give, "a voice to the voiceless - ordinary men who had never been allowed to speak for themselves".

In the introduction, Campbell expressed very harsh criticism of what were then widely held stereotypes, such as that speakers of Celtic languages are overwhelmingly melancholy, ignorant, but noble savages, or that the Scottish Gàidhealtachd was completely isolated from the literature and culture of the outside world. In reality, Campbell explained, the Jacobite war poetry of Alasdair mac Mhaighstir Alasdair (Alexander MacDonald, 1st of Arisaig) shows a very clear understanding of the political and dynastic issues at stake and abounds with learned allusions to both Classical mythology and the Christian Bible. Even the contemporary poetry of Duncan Ban MacIntyre, who was illiterate in his own language, is similarly filled with allusions to the Fenian Cycle of Celtic mythology, stories from which James Macpherson would later adapt into Ossian and use to capture the whole world's imagination.

In a very public rejection of his own ancestors' support for the House of Hanover and their role in the defeat of the Jacobite Army, Campbell also wrote, "the Rising of 1745 was the natural reaction of the Jacobite clans and their sympathisers in the Highlands against what had been, since the coming of William of Orange in 1690, a calculated genocidal campaign against the religion of many and the language of all Highlanders." Despite these deliberately provoking words, the book received favorable reviews.

In the mid-1930s, Campbell began living on the Hebridean island of Barra with the author Compton Mackenzie. On Barra, which Ray Penman has since described as, "a classless society", Campbell's childhood trauma over the lack of a caring father figure was eased by his close friendship with local seanchaidh John The Coddy MacPherson. During their conversations, whenever Campbell stumbled over his Gaelic phrases and retreated back into speaking English, MacPherson would hold up his hand and say, (Scottish Gaelic: "Abair siod fhathast, Iain.") ("Say that again, John.")

Also while on Barra, Campbell and Mackenzie founded the Sea League to fight for the rights of local fisherman. They also organised a successful tax strike by all Barra motor car owners as a protest against the Government's failure to properly maintain the island's roads. The tax strike led to many similar campaigns of civil disobedience and direct action, which gained wide publicity and forced the Civil Service to make substantial changes that drastically improved the efficiency of both government and postal delivery in the Western Isles.

== Personal life ==
On an extremely wet and rainy evening in 1934, Campbell was introduced as "Young Inverneill" to his future wife, American ethnomusicologist Margaret Fay Shaw, by the manager of the Lochboisdale Hotel on South Uist. Campbell later recalled, "As so often happens, we didn't take to each other at first, but we got to know each other and we were working in the same little world."

Their courtship was slow and awkward, but in March 1935, Margaret Fay Shaw brought Campbell to meet her family in Glenshaw, Pennsylvania. She later recalled that he spent the whole visit chasing butterflies in the nearby forest or typing up articles in his room. The whole Fay Shaw family accordingly decided that Campbell must not be seriously interested in Margaret and no one was more shocked than she was when Campbell proposed marriage on the last day of his visit.

In June 1935, John Lorne Campbell and Margaret Fay Shaw were married by Rev. Calum MacLeod in the manse of John Knox Presbyterian Church in Glasgow. Neither family attended and the bride was given away by family friend Fred Moir. At the groom's insistence, the entire ceremony was conducted in the Scottish Gaelic language and the bride was relieved to learn that she had only to say, "Tha" ("Yes"). The Campbells spent their brief honeymoon in the Lofoten and Vesteraalen Islands of Norway before returning to Scotland.

== Folklorist, naturalist, and Laird of Canna ==
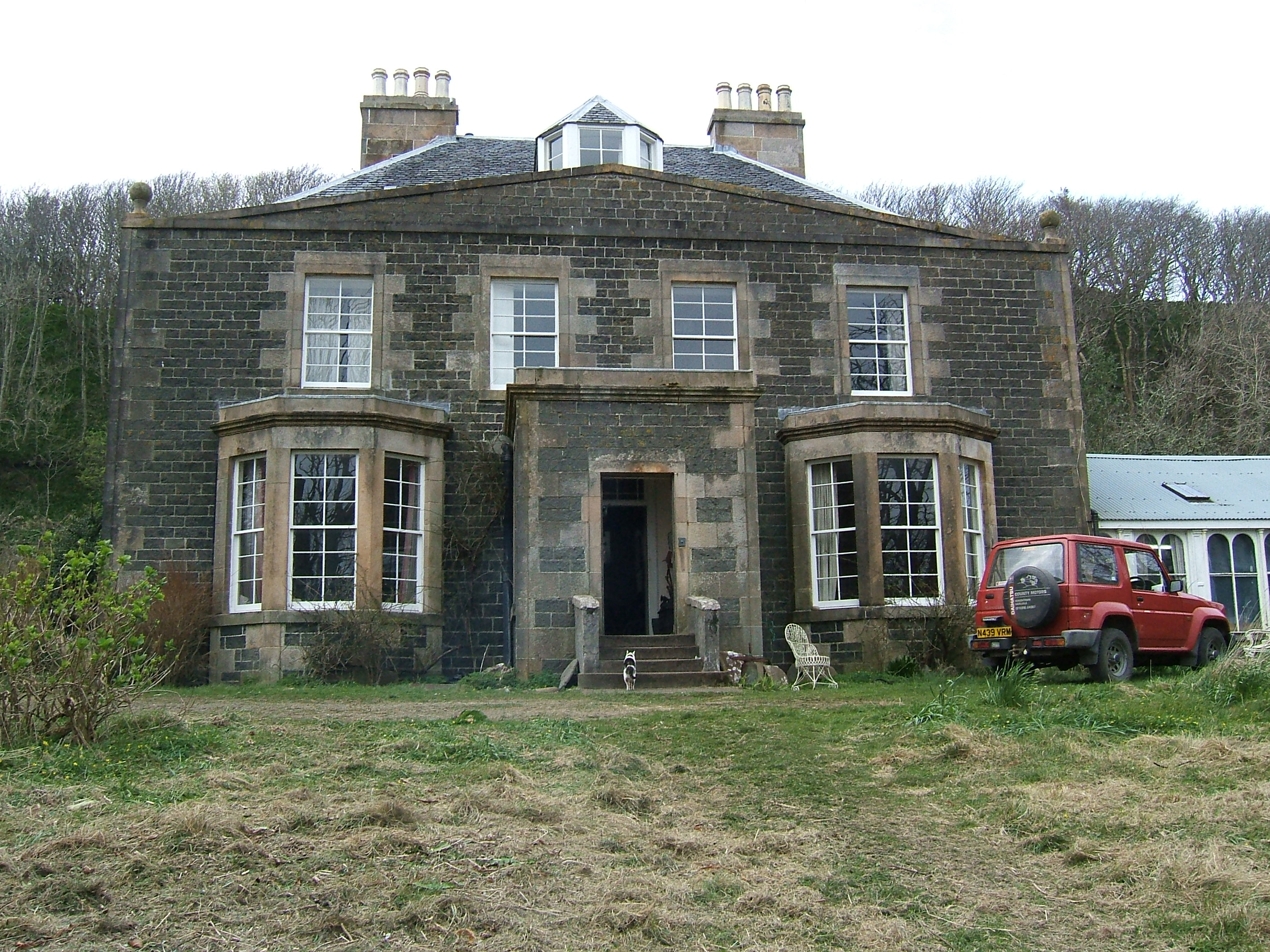
Canna House, where John Lorne Campbell and Margaret Fay Shaw's private archive of Scottish Gaelic literature, history, and folklore is preserved.

In addition to his other interests, in 1936 Campbell began to study the distribution and migration of insects. His Hebridean collection, started on Barra in 1936 was continued on Canna from 1938 with the use of a mercury vapour moth trap from 1951 onwards. The collection now consists of 30 cabinet drawers containing 283 species of macrolepidoptera, including the first recorded specimen of the noctuid moth Dianthoecia caesia taken in Scotland and some other surprises.

In June 1936, Campbell's work collecting and publishing Scottish Gaelic folktales tipped off the Irish Folklore Commission to the fact that the oral tradition still survived in the Gàidhealtachd. Dr. Séamus Ó Duilearga accordingly wrote to Campbell and invited him to visit the Commission's archives in Dublin. While Campbell was unable at the time to accept, their correspondence continued and was the beginning of a decades long collaboration.

In 1937, the Campbells' travelled to Nova Scotia with an Ediphone to record Canadian Gaelic folklore and traditional singers. The Campbells spent six weeks in Cape Breton, where they used the Ediphone to record upon wax cylinders ninety five Gaelic traditional songs and ballads, two games, seven local songs, and three original songs sung by their composer. John Campbell also persuaded Jonathon G. MacKinnon (1869–1944), the former editor of the literary magazine Mac-Talla, to introduce him to Gabriel Syllibuy, the Chief of Cape Breton's indigenous Mi'kmaq people. The Campbells recorded Syllibuy as he described, in the Mikmaq language, an account from the oral tradition about the arrival of the first Gaels in the Province. The Campbells also recorded other Mikmaqs singing Catholic plain song hymns in the Mik'maq language.

The Canadian Gaelic song recordings made in Nova Scotia by the Campbells were later transcribed into musical notation with the assistance of Irish traditional musician and collector Séamus Ennis and published in the volume, Songs Remembered in Exile: Traditional Gaelic Songs from Nova Scotia Recorded in Cape Breton and Antigonish County in 1937, with an Account of the Causes of the Highland Emigration, 1790–1835.

During their visit, they also called at St. Francis Xavier University, where they met and befriended Fr. Moses Coady, a priest of the Catholic Diocese of Antigonish and the founder of the Antigonish Movement. Campbell was later to praise Fr. Coady's ideas and to suggest that similar activism be introduced to Scotland.

In 1938 the couple bought the island of Canna, south of Skye, and went to live there in Canna House. He farmed the island for 40 years and made it a sanctuary for wildlife, while researching local history and folklore and also attempting to improve the prosperity of the local population. At the same time the Campbells continued to record a disappearing Gaelic heritage and to write and publish extensively about Highland culture, Scottish Gaelic literature, and life. Campbell was also the official insect migration recorder for Canna from 1938, and was at times able to get the help of more than one head lighthouse keeper from Hyskeir.

== Crossing the Tiber ==
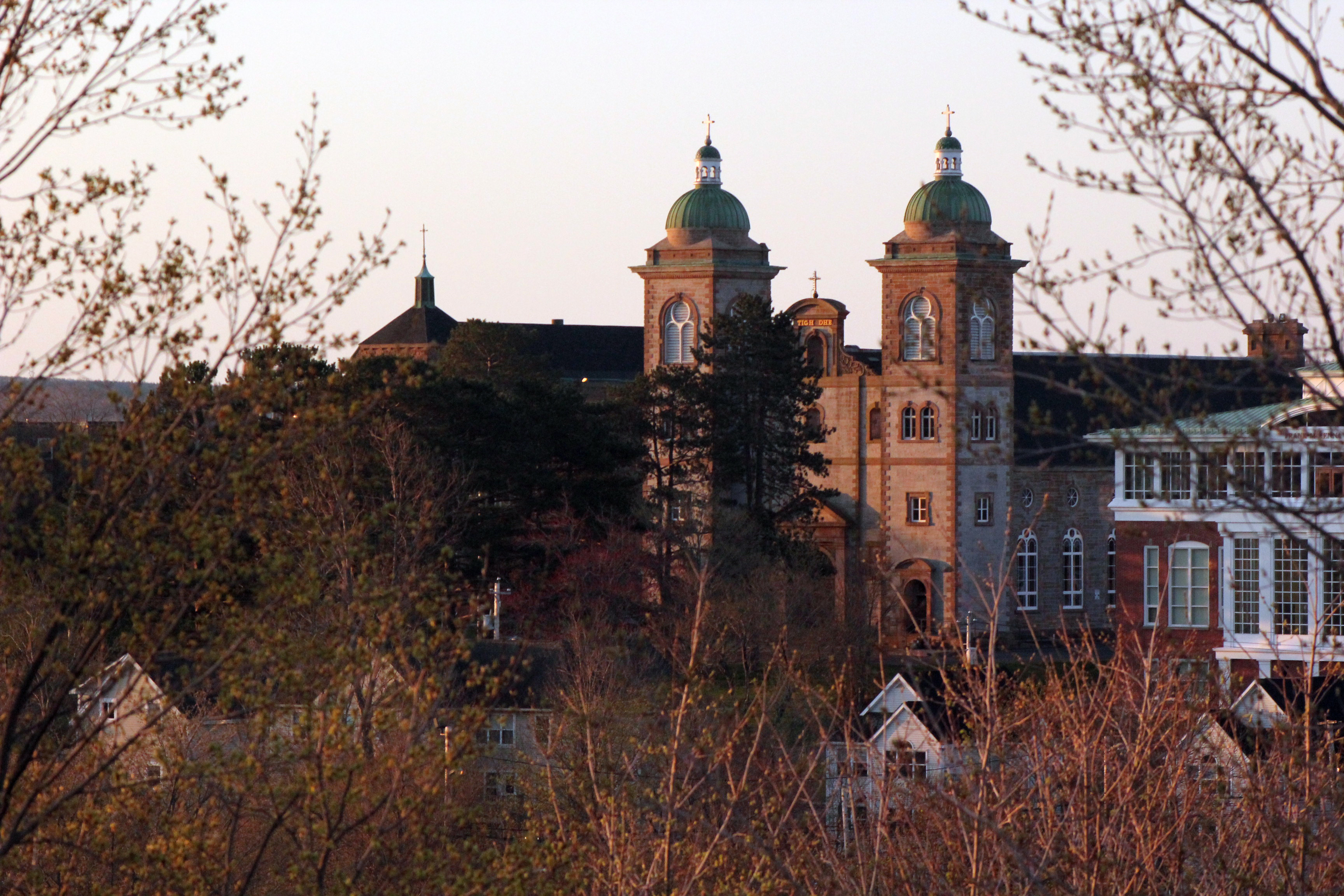
St Ninian's Cathedral, the seat of the Catholic Diocese of Antigonish.

In 1946, after healing from a nervous breakdown at Oxford with the assistance of a Catholic therapist, John Lorne Campbell was received into the Catholic Church inside St. Ninian's Cathedral in Antigonish, Nova Scotia. While writing a subsequent explanation for his conversion, Campbell cited his intense dislike for the role that Protestantism had played in the 17th and 18th-century ideology of the Whig political party and that party's legacy in creating the modern centralized British state. Campbell also explained that his research into Highland culture and history had led to many close and lasting friendships with Catholic priests and laity. Lastly, Campbell expressed an "aesthetic preference" for the Tridentine Mass over the High Church Anglican worship of his childhood.

In later years, Campbell would often deliberately irk visitors with anti-Catholic or Unionist views by speaking proudly of, "we Papists", expressing his admiration for the Jacobite risings, and his belief in Scottish nationalism. His wife Margaret followed him a few years later into the Catholic Church in Scotland, but always insisted that her favorite English-language Presbyterian hymns from her childhood be sung during Low Mass at St Columba's R.C. Church upon Canna, much to the incomprehension of the island's Gaelic-speaking population.

After John Lorne Campbell was received into the Catholic Church, his previous fascination with the iconic Gaelic poet Fr. Allan MacDonald ripened into an obsession. According to his biographer Ray Penman, "Over 20 years John was to devote a considerable amount of time and money to tracing the work of Fr. Allan, publishing much of it for the first time, righting wrongs he believed had been done to the priest and writing a short biography. The more he learned of him and read his work, the more he identified with him."

With the help of various friends and the universities of Glasgow and Edinburgh, Campbell succeeded in tracking down the poetry manuscripts, diaries, and detailed folklore notebooks of Fr. Allan MacDonald, which had been missing and presumed lost since his death in 1905. As word spread, others shared surviving letters to and from Fr Allan. Further detailed research by Campbell about Fr. MacDonald's life, times, and writings, as well as his diary, was similarly collected and housed at Canna, in the Inner Hebrides of Scotland. Campbell has been widely credited since with restoring both Fr. MacDonald's reputation and his enormous importance to Scottish Gaelic literature.

Campbell also continued to be involved in researching and publicizing the life and work of war poet Alasdair mac Mhaighstir Alasdair, who fought as a Captain in the Clanranald regiment of the Jacobite Army while also serving as a Gaelic tutor to Prince Charles Edward Stuart, and who is widely considered the greatest poet in Scottish Gaelic literature, with only Sorley MacLean as a recent exception. Campbell admired Captain Alasdair MacDonald's command of the Gaelic language and it's prosody very deeply, but was a very harsh critic of how systematically The Clanranald Bard's poetry had been bowdlerized for more than 200 years by puritanical editors. Campbell also went on the record as a similarly harsh critic of what he considered the unreliability of Captain MacDonald's statements to Bishop Robert Forbes, not about the events of the 1745 rising, but about the story of his own life.

== Later life ==
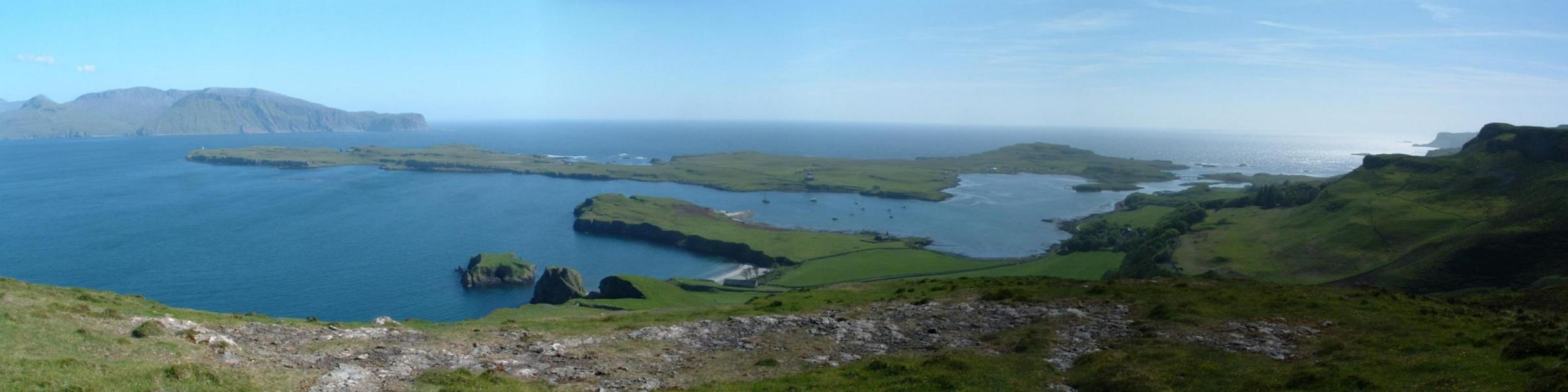
Panorama taken from Compass Hill on Canna, overlooking Canna Bay and Sanday towards Rùm.

In 1946, the Irish Folklore Commission dispatched trained folklorist Calum Maclean from Inverin in the Connemara Gaeltacht to the Hebrides with orders to begin systematic folklore collecting, with Campbell's assistance, that he later continued for the School of Scottish Studies.

During the early 1950s, American ethnomusicologist Alan Lomax used several of Campbell's field recordings without permission for a vinyl album of Scottish traditional music for Columbia Records, much to Campbell's chagrin.

In 1961, Campbell published Stories from South Uist, which he had begun collecting with a wire recorder from seanchaidh Angus MacLellan. Campbell explained that he had modeled his Gaelic-English translation of MacLellan's stories upon the recently published volume Tales from the Arab Tribes by Charles Grimshaw Campbell, which Campbell praised as, "a masterpiece of translation of folk-tales from another language into readable English." Angus MacLellan's similarly dictated autobiography, The Furrow Behind Me, was published in the same year.

The first collection of Fr. Allan MacDonald's Gaelic verse, Bàrdachd Mghr Ailein: The Gaelic Poems of Fr Allan McDonald of Eriskay (1859–1905), was both edited and self published by Campbell in 1965. In 1966, future Gaelic literary scholar Ronald Black received a suitcase full of Gaelic books from Campbell and brought them to Eriskay for sale aboard a ferry from Ludag, South Uist. At the time, Eriskay still had many Scottish Gaelic monoglot speakers who had known Fr. Allan MacDonald personally and Black has since recalled that the poetry book and Campbell's "little blue biography of Father Allan", both accordingly, "sold like hotcakes".

Following the Second Vatican Council, Campbell and Shaw disliked the abandonment of the Ecclesiastical Latin liturgical language and the subsequent introduction of the Mass of Paul VI in the vernacular. They accordingly joined the Scottish Branch of Fœderatio Internationalis Una Voce, which still presses for the greater availability of the Tridentine Mass, immediately upon its foundation in 1965.

In a 2023 article, Traditionalist Catholic biographer Charles A. Coulombe wrote, "As with most isolated folk in those days, they were at the mercy of whatever the Diocese gave them - but the Campbells were not quiet about their preferences. For John Lorne Campbell, the Latin and Koine Greek once so well known by local priests were a bridge to the greater world for Gaeldom - as reflected in their songs and stories - without the medium of English. In addition to the religious issues the changes raised, they also threatened to submerge various Catholic subcultures around the globe through forcing worship in the ever encroaching dominant vernacular. Subsequent experience has shown him to be entirely correct."

For much of the 1970s, Campbell fought a bitter but ultimately successful battle to maintain ferry service to Canna, which both he and the local population saw as a desperately needed lifeline to the outside world. Campbell later explained, "It was from my Campbell grandfather that I learned that it was the duty of a Highland laird to defend his tenants and employees - as Highlanders we did not consider a cash nexus the sole basis of our personal relationships with them. That was the basis of my own relationship with the Canna people. I can see that nowadays it is considered to be an old fashioned one, but I am prepared to stand by it at all times. If the laird wants loyalty from his tenants and employees, he must be loyal to them."

In 1981 Campbell donated Canna to the National Trust for Scotland, but continued to live on the island. Interviews with Campbell and Shaw were broadcast in 1985 on Scottish Television, in a programme called "Canna – an Island Story".

In 1990, Campbell was awarded an OBE by Queen Elizabeth II, but declined to travel to Holyrood Palace for the ceremony. His biographer, Ray Perman, suspects that, "The thought of bowing before a Hanoverian monarch may have been too much for him." Instead, Ian Campbell, 12th Duke of Argyll, Chief of Clan Campbell, and Lord Lieutenant of Argyll and Bute travelled to Canna to present the award, but Campbell remained painfully shy and had to be coaxed with difficulty into attending the ceremony.

In 1991, Campbell went on the record as a vocal sceptic and harsh critic of the Orkney child abuse scandal, which involved allegations of Satanic ritual abuse against the minister and nine sets of parents on the island of South Ronaldsay. Campbell compared the allegations to the 1614 investigation by the Spanish Inquisition into a witch hunt in the Basque Country, which concluded that no witchcraft had ever taken place. Campbell was harshly criticized for making this comparison, but he was later proven to have been correct. The Orkney allegations were later found to be completely baseless.

According to Ray Perman, "In 1992, he received a Papal Knighthood. This accolade pleased him most, since it was granted on the recommendation of the Catholic priests of the islands and West Highlands -- men he respected and had worked with over decades. A Traditionalist in religious matters who always favored the Latin Mass, he nevertheless petitioned the Church authorities to have the service of investiture in Gaelic."

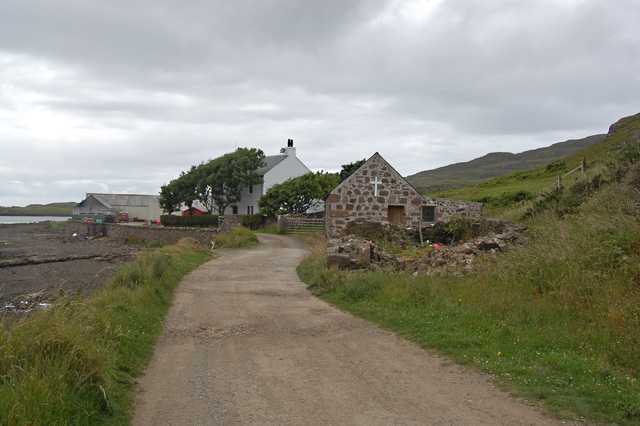
The c.1770 Catholic chapel dedicated to St Columba, Canna.

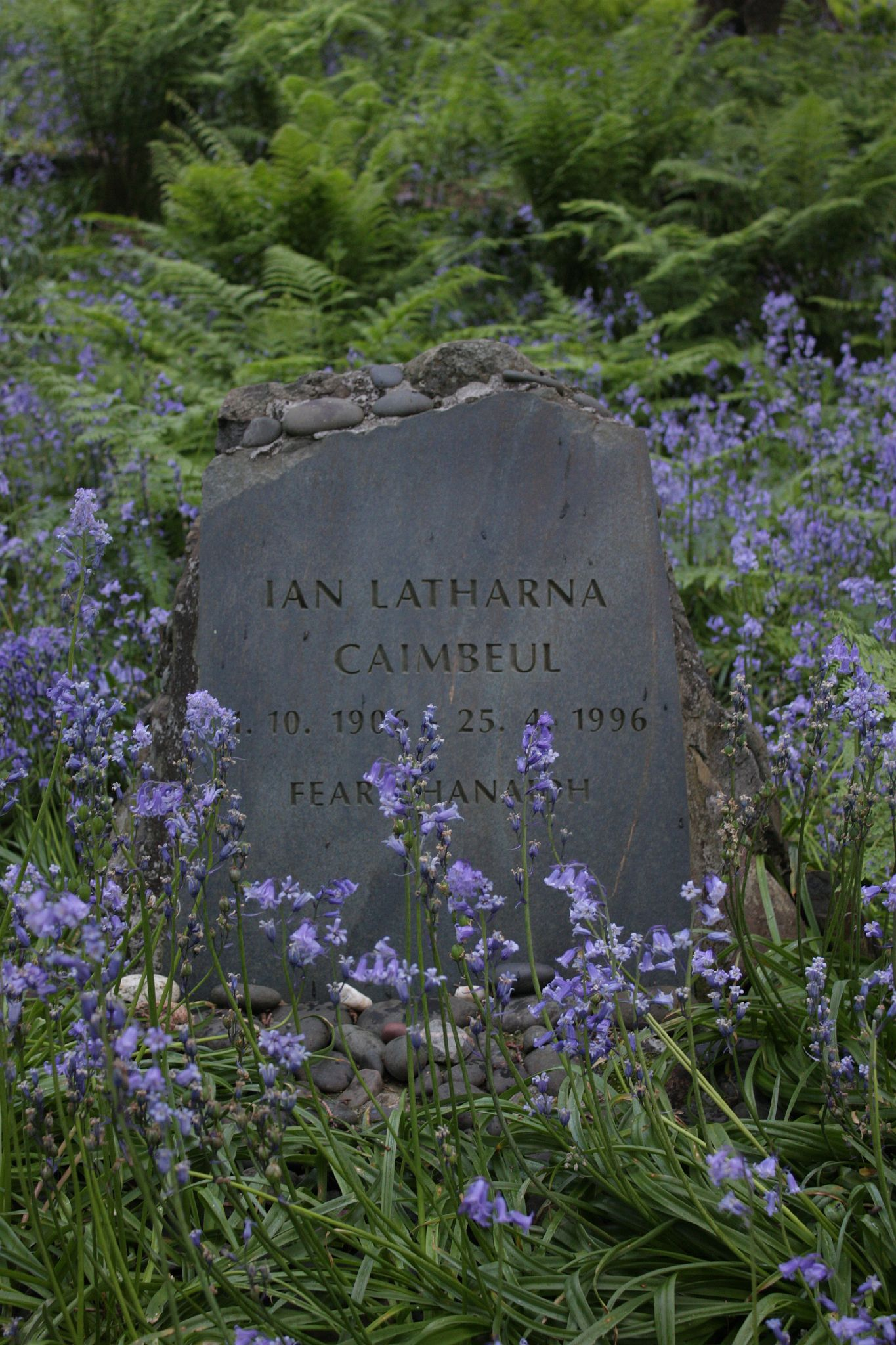
Grave of John Lorne Campbell, near St. Columba's Catholic Church, Canna.

He died on 25 April 1996 whilst on holiday at Villa San Girolamo in Fiesole in Italy, and in accordance with his wishes was "buried where he fell". In 2006, however, Cambell's body was repatriated and reburied in a birch wood planted by himself near St. Columba's Catholic chapel on Canna. In 2008, a headstone was taken from the garden at Taynish House on the Inverneill estate, brought to Canna, and set in a small cairn, with the inscription:

Iain Latharna Caimbeul
1. 10. 1906 - 25. 4. 1996
Fear Chanaidh

His widow remained living at Canna House until her death in 2004 at the age of 101. As Campbell had stipulated in his Will, money was left to the Diocese of Argyll and the Isles for the Tridentine Requiem Mass to be offered annually for the souls of Campbell and Shaw. The request continues to be honored annually by Una Voce Scotland.

== Legacy ==
Campbell's partnership with Shaw was professional as well as marital. Together the couple assembled an important archive of both Scottish and Canadian Gaelic folklore, folksongs and poetry, including manuscripts, sound recordings, photographs and film, in an effort inspired by that carried on by Marjory Kennedy-Fraser in the 1900s. The Campbells' three-volume collection of Hebridean folk songs, published between 1969 and 1981, is regarded as a valuable source. The Campbells' archive at Canna House, which is a similarly invaluable source for scholars of Scottish Gaelic literature, Scottish traditional musicians, and folklorists, is now in the possession of the National Trust for Scotland. As of 2013, the many Ediphone wax cylinders, upon which the Campbells' had recorded folklore and traditional music in Scottish Gaelic, Canadian Gaelic, and Mikmaq, were on long term loan to the British Library for the purposes of being digitized. The School of Scottish Studies has since made the digitized recordings available online through the Tobar an Dualchais – Kist o Riches website.

Both the recent rise of Scottish nationalism and the ongoing efforts by the Scottish Parliament to ensure a Scottish Gaelic language revival through the setting up of immersion schools are also John Lorne Campbell's legacy.

A biography of Campbell, The Man Who Gave Away His Island by Ray Perman, was published by Birlinn Limited in 2010.

== Bibliography ==
=== Books ===
- 1933 Highland Songs of the Forty Five – Translated and edited, with biographies of the poets. Published by John Grant. Second edition, revised, published by the Scottish Gaelic Texts Society in 1984. [CH2/1/1/1]
- 1936 The Book of Barra - with Compton MacKenzie and Carl H.J. Borgstrom. Edited by Campbell. Published by G. Routledge and Sons Ltd., and printed by the Edinburgh Press. Republished by Acair in 1998 [CH2/1/1/6.]
- 1958 Gaelic Words from South Uist – Collected by Fr. Allan MacDonald. Edited, Dublin Institute for Advanced Studies. Second edition with supplement, published by the Oxford University Press, N.D 1972. [CH2/1/1/13]
- 1960 Tales from Barra, Told by the Coddy. Edited, with foreword by Compton MacKenzie and introduction by Campbell who also transcribed the Gaelic versions. The tales in English [most of them in the book] were taken down in shorthand by Sheila Lockett. The Coddy [John MacPherson, North Bay, Barra] was one of the few Gaelic storytellers equally fluent in Gaelic and English. Privately printed. [Second edition 1961, revised reprints 1973, 1975, 1992 CH2/1/1/3.
- 1961 Stories from South Uist, Told by Angus MacLellan. Recorded by Campbell and transcribed from the recording in translation. Routledge & Kegan Paul, 1961. 2nd edition by Birlinn Ltd 1997. Reprinted in 2001 by Birlinn. [CH2/1/1/5
- 1962 The Furrow Behind Me, told by Angus MacLelllan, South Uist. Recorded in Gaelic and translated from the recordings, with notes by Campbell RKP. A Country Book Club Choice in 1963. 2nd edition 1997 by Birlinn Ltd. Reprinted in 2002. [CH2/1/1/4]
- 1963 Edward Lhuyd in the Scottish Highlands – with Derick Thomson. Oxford University Press. [Lhuyd's diaries of his travels in the Highlands 1699–1700 had been lost but, with the help of W. O'Sullivan, keeper of the manuscripts at Trinity College, Dublin, his rough notes written mostly in Welsh were discovered. These were translated by Derick Thomson. The book also contains the Scottish Gaelic words noted by Lhuyd that correspond to entries in John Ray's Dictionariolum Trilingue. [CH2/1/1/7
- 1964 A School in South Uist, by Frederic Rea. The school was Garrynamona School in Fr. Allan MacDonald's parish. The typescript was sent to Campbell by a relation of Rea's and edited with an introduction and notes and the use of photographs taken by Walter Blaikie on his tour of the Jacobite highlands and islands in 1897, kindly made available by P.J.W. Kilpatrick. Routledge & Kegan Paul 2nd edition 1997 by Birlinn. Reprinted 2001-2003 [CH2/1/1/10]
- 1965 Bardachd Mhgr Ailein: The Gaelic Poems of Fr Allan McDonald of Eriskay (1859–1905), transcribed by Campbell from his manuscript and edited with some translations. Privately. [CH2/1/1/13]
- 1968 Strange Things: The Story of Fr Allan McDonald, Ada Goodrich Freer, and the Society for Psychical Research's Enquiry into Highland Second Sight, with the story of Ada Goodrich Freer, the Ballechin House ghost hunt, and the stories and folklore collected by Fr. Allan MacDonald of Eriskay. With Trevor H. Hall. Routledge & Kegan Paul. The book is an exposure of Ada Goodrich Freer's questionable mediumship, and her plagiarisation of Fr. Allan MacDonald's folklore collection in various articles and lectures. [CH2/1/1/13]
- 1969 Hebridean Folksongs, with Francis Collinson. Vol. II 1977, Vol. III 1981 Oxford University Press. The first volume is based on the collection of waulking songs made by Donald MacCormik, who was school attendance officer, in South Uist in 1893. Campbell found translations of about half the songs made by Fr. Allan McDonald, in the Carmichael papers in Edinburgh University Library, and completed the translation and added notes and a large glossary. The airs were transcribed by F. Collinson from Campbell's recordings made between 1938 and 1965; he also wrote the musicological chapters. Volumes II and III are based entirely on Campbell's recordings. The singers were from Benbecula, South Uist, Eriskay, Vatersay, Barra, and Cape Breton. The three books contain 135 songs connected with the waulking of the homespun tweed cloth; such waulkings, by hand, appear to have died out in the early 1950s. The books are a source for many of the originals of Mrs Marjory Kennedy-Fraser's art songs in her Songs of the Hebrides.
- 1972 Saoghal an Treobhaiche. [The Ploughman's World]. The Gaelic original of "The Furrow Behind Me". Published by the Gaelic Book Club, this first appeared in the Norwegian learned journal Lochlann in 1965.
- 1975 A Collection of Highland Rites and Customes. Copied by Edward Lhuy from the manuscript of the Rev. James Kirkwood [1650–1709] and annotated by him [Lhuyd] with the aid of the Rev. John Beaton. Edited by Campbell from the manuscript Carte 269 of the Bodleian Library. Published by D.S. Brewer for the Folklore Society Mistletoe Series.
- 1984 Canna: The Story of a Hebridean Island. Published by the Oxford University Press for the National Trust for Scotland. Revised reprint 1986, 1994, 2000.
- 1990 Songs Remembered in Exile: Traditional Gaelic Songs from Nova Scotia Recorded in Cape Breton and Antigonish County in 1937, with an Account of the Causes of the Highland Emigration, 1790–1835. Tunes mostly transcribed by Séamus Ennis; illustrations by Margaret Fay Shaw. Published by Aberdeen University Press 1990, Reprint 1999 by Birlinn.

=== Shorter items ===
- 1936 ORAIN GHAIDHLIG LE SEONAIDH CAIMBEUL, the Gaelic Songs of Shony Campbell, the South Lochboisdale bard. Transcribed by John MacInnes MBE And prepared for publication by JLC. Privately, revised Reprint 1937. 880 copies printed in all.
- 1938 SGEUL AN DRAOIDH EILE. Henry van Dyke's story The Other Wise Man Gaelic translation by J.G. Mackinnon founder and editor of the Canadian Gaelic fortnightly MAC TALLA, 1892–1904, prepared for publication in Scotland by JLC. Privately. [J.G. Mackinnon, who lived in Cape Breton, is wrongly stated in MacLean's [Typographia Scoto- Gadelica] to have died in 1904; he lived until 1944. JLC met him in Cape Breton in 1932 and again 1937].
- 1939 SIA SGIALACHDAN, Six Gaelic Stories from South Uist and Barra. Taken down by JLC and edited with English precis. Privately. [Only 250 copies were printed; but many more could have been sold. The late Professor Séamus Ó Duilearga informed JLC that this booklet had roused the Irish Folklore Commission to the fact that the Scottish Gaelic oral tradition was still alive in the Outer Hebrides].
- 1939 ACT NOW FOR THE HIGHLANDS AND ISLANDS. With Sir Alexander MacEwen. Saltire Society. This pamphlet made the first suggestion of the creation of a Highland Development Board, which was envisaged as something on the lines of the old Land Court. Amongst matters discussed were transport, the cooperative movement in Nova Scotia, and the Norwegia Government's protection of Norwegian sea fisheries.
- 1944 AN TRIUIR CHOIGREACH. J.G. MacKinnon's translation of Thomas Hardy's story The Three Strangers into Canadian Gaelic. Prepared for publication in Scotland by JLC. Privately.
- 1945 GAELIC IN SCOTTISH EDUCATION AND LIFE. Saltire Society written in the lines of "Welsh in Education and Life" The report of the Departmental Committee appointed by the President of the Board of Education, 1927. Second edition revised, 1950.
- 1950 GAELIC FOLKSONGS FROM THE ISLE OF BARRA, with Annie Johnston and John MacLean M.A. Linguaphone Co. for the Folklore Institute of Scotland Book of words with five twelve inch. 78 r.p.m. discs. Many of the songs later appeared in the three volumes of Hebridean Folksongs with musical transcriptions by Francis Collison.
- 1954 FR. ALLAN MACDONALD OF ERISKAY, PRIEST, POET FOLKLORIST. Oliver & Boyd, for the author. Based on a Broadcast talk given at St. Francis Xavier University, Antigonish, Nova Scotia. in May 1953. [Second Edition revised 1956].
- 1965 THE STORY OF CONALL GULBANN, Son of the King of Ireland; versions recorded from Neil MacNeil, Isle of Barra, and Angus MacLellan MBE, South Uist. Gaelic Texts and English precis. Reprinted from the Transactions of the Gaelic Society of Inverness, Vol. XLIV. Transactions of recordings made in February 1950 and September 1960. The Story of Conall Gulban is one of the great romantic stories of Gaelic oral tradition, and in these versions of it the two-story tellers recorded reveal their full artistry.
- 1965 PROVERBS FROM THE ISLE OF BARRA, Collected by the late Neil Sinclair. Prepared for publication and printed in Vol. X of Scottish Gaelic Studies. Private reprint.
- 1968 SCOTTISH GAELIC PROVERBS; Seanfhocail agus Comhadan. No. 11 of Highland Information Pamphlets. Published by An Comunn Gaidhealach.
- 1975 OUR BARRA YEARS. [Memories of the Isle of Barra and of Sir Compton MacKenzie, 1933–1938] Reprinted privately from the Scots Magazine, August and September,1975.
- 1982 NOTES ON CARMINA GADELICA. Reprint of two articles and reviews in Scottish Gaelic Studies.

=== Articles and reviews in journals ===
SCOTTISH GAELIC STUDIES.

- 1935 Vol. IV p. 18. Some notes on the poems of Alexander MacDonald. CH2/1/5/6
- ------------p. 24. The Lost Songs of the forty-Five.
- ------------p. 70,153. Gaelic MS LXIII of the National Library.
- 1942 Vol.V .p. 76 An Early Scottish Gaelic Vocabulary. [this is found as Appendix n.11 in W. Nicolson's "Scottish Historical Library". It turned to be a translation of part of John Ray's Dictionariolum Trilingue.
- 1949 Vol.VI p. 27. Some Words from the Vocabulary of Alexander MacDonald. CH2/1/5/16 [34] 1947--------p. 43. The Second Edition of Alexander MacDonald's Poems [JLC found the sole copy known to exist bound up with other material in the Marquess of Bute's Library.] CH2/1/5/16
- -------p. 212. Hiatus in Hebridean Place-Names of Norse origin.
- 1953 Vol. VII p. 196. Lexicographical Notes.
- 1961 Vol. IX p. 39. The Royal Irish Academy Text of "Birlinn Chlann Raghnaill" [Alexander MacDonald's well known poem] CH2/1/5/16.
- -------- p. 89. Varia: Scottish Gaelic Translations of John Ray's Dictionariolum Trilingue.
- The beginning of Mac Vurich's Panegyrick on the MacLeans.
- Bibliographical Note on 'Gearan Brathar' [of which JLC acquired what may be the only existing copy]
- 1965 Vol. X p. 178 Gaelic Proverbs from the Isle of Barra, collected by the late Neil Sinclair [ who was the schoolmaster at Northbay, and a brother of Donald Sinclair the bard] CH2/1/5/17.
- -------- p. 209. Varia; a Confusion of References in the Second Edition of Alexander MacBain's Etymological Gaelic Dictionary.
- Other references in MacBain's Dictionary
- A dating error in Máire MacNeill's Lughnasa.
- The Chimeric Folktale in the Lowlands.
- Gaelic Numerals recorded in Wafer's Account of Darien.
- Gaelic in Jamaica in 1768.
- ------- p. 235. Review of Annie M. MacKenzie's edition of Orain Iain Luim, Songs of John MacDonald, Bard of Keppoch.
- ------- p . Review of 'More West Highland Tales' Vol.2
- 1968 Vol. XI p. 171. Notes on the Poems ascribe to Mary MacLeod in D.C. MacPherson's Duanaire.
- ------ p. 262. Review of Cathaldus Giblin OFM 'The Irish Franciscan Mission to Scotland, 1619–1646'.
- 1971 Vol. XII p. 59. The Expurgating of MacMhaighstir Alasdair [Alexander MacDonald's Gaelic Poems].
- 1976------ p. 290 Review of Vol. VI of Carmina Gadelica, edited by Angus Matheson.
- ------- p. 300 Review of William Matheson's edition of the Gaelic poems of the Blind Harper, An Clarsair Dall. * ------ p. 304 Review of Mario M. Rossi's edition and Italian translation of the original text of Kirk's 'Secret Commonwealth', Il Capellano delle Fate. [A work previously almost entirely unnoticed in Scotland].
- 1978 Vol. XIII p. 1 Notes on Hamish Robertson's Studies in Carmichael's Carmina Gadelica.
- ------ p. 183. Carmina Gadelica George Henderson's Corrections and Suggestions. [to check for]Review of the Gaelic writings of the Rev. Dr. Kenneth Macleod.

CONTRIBUTION TO THE SCOTTISH HISTORICAL REVIEW.

- 1954 Vol. XXXIII p. 175. The Norse Language in Orkney in 1725 also: 1959Vol. XXXVIII p. 70. Review of the Scottish Highlands a Short History, by W.R. Kermack.

CONTRIBUTIONS TO THE INNES REVIEW

- 1953 Vol. IV p. 42. Some Notes and Comments on "The Irish Franciscan Mission to Scotland by Rev. Cathaldus Giblin OFM. [60] 1953------ p. 110. The Letter sent by Iain Muideartach, twelfth Chief of Clanranald, to Pope Urban VIII, in 1626..
- 1954 Vol. V p. 33. The MacNeils of Barra and the Irish Franciscans.
- 1956 Vol. VII p. 101. The Sources of the Gaelic Hymnal, 1893 [the hymnal compiled and partly composed by Fr. Allan McDonald of Eriskay].
- 1966 Vol. XVII p. 82. The MacNeils of Barra in the Forty-five [with Constance Eastwick].
- 1989Vol. XL p. 72 [ed.] Blairs College in 1883, by Mgr. Canon W. MacMaster.

CONTRIBUTIONS TO SCOTTISH STUDIES

- 1958 Vol. 2, p.175. The Late Fr. Allan McDonald, Miss Goodrich Freer, and Hebridean Folklore. [The original exposure of Ada Goodrich Freer's plagiarization of Fr. Allan McDonald's folklore collection, developed later into JLC's part of Strange Things, see n.10
- 1966 Vol. 10, p. 193. Angus MacLellan MBE ["Aonghus Beag"].[Obituary of Angus MacLellan the famous South Uist storyteller, see Ns.5 and 6]

CONTRIBUTION TO AMERICAN SPEECH

- 1936 Vol. XI p. 128. Scottish Gaelic in Canada.

CONTRIBUTIONS TO THE JOURNAL OF CELTIC STUDIES

- 1953 Vol. II p. 134. Some Errors in the Names of Animals in Gaelic Dictionaries. [69] 1958------ p. 214. Some Errors in Professor Hume Brown's Edition of Donald Munro's Description of the Western Islands.

CONTRIBUTIONS TO CELTICA

- 1960 Vol. V p. 218. The Tour of Edward Lhuyd in Ireland.
- 1976 Vol. XI p. 34. Unpublished Letters by Edward Lhuyd in the National Library of Scotland. [This was the Miles Dillon Memorial Volume of Celtica]

CONTRIBUTIONS TO EIGSE

- 1939 Vol. I p. 309. Note on the Hebridean version of the song Cailin o Chois tsiuire me
- 1940 Vol. II p. 44. Note on the Gaelic word Cuilbheir.
- 1952Vol. VI p. 146. An Account of some Irish Harpers, as given by Echlin O'Kean, Harper, Anno 1779.[The original is in JLC's family papers.]
- 1956 Vol. VIII p. 87. Some Notes on Scottish Gaelic Waulking Songs. [76]------ p. 261. The Text of Carmina Gadelica.
- 1958 Vol. IX p. 57. Notes on Alexander MacDonald's 'Oran a' Gheamhraidh'. [78] ------ p. 129. More Notes on Scottish Gaelic Waulking Songs. [79]------ p. 165. Note on the word ucaire [=waulker]
- 1961 Vol. X p. 176. Note on Hebridean eisdeacht [=confession] Alexander MacDonald's oran a' Gheamhraidh.

CARMINA GADELICA 1983 REPRINT

- 1982 Vol.I. Introduction. [quotes from letters from Fr. Allan McDonald to Alexander Carmichael]

CONTRIBUTION TO LOCHLANN

- 1972 Vol. V. Angus MacLellan: Saoghal an Treobhaiche, The Autobiography of a Hebridean Crofter. [Lochlann appeared as supplementary volumes to the Norsk Tidsskrift for Sprogvidenskap. The Norwegian Journal of Linguistics. Saoghal an Treobhaiche occupied the whole of vol. V of Lochlann. See ns.6 and 12 here.

CONTRIBUTIONS TO ETUDES CELTIQUES

- 1954 Vol. VI p. 216. Obituary, Jonathan MacKinnon. [Jonathan MacKinnon 1870–1944 was the founder publisher and editor of the Gaelic paper MacTalla, which ran from 1892 to 1904 at Sydney, Cape Breton.] See nrs. 17 and 20.

CONTRIBUTIONS TO AN GAIDHEAL

- 1835 Catalogue of the 1776 Eigg Collection of Gaelic poetry, published by Ranald MacDonald.
- Catalogue of the Turner Collection of Gaelic poetry, published by Peter Turner, 1813. [These are two very important collections]
- Remarks in the Margin of MS XL of the National Library of Scotland's Gaelic MSS. [Possibly connected with Alexander MacDonald].
- [May Issue]. The Dimensions of an Harp. From Gaelic MS LXV of the National Library of Scotland.
- 1951 Vol. XLVI p. 43. Alexander MacDonald's 'Oganaich uir a' Chuil Teudaich'. Full text of song of which only five couplets were previously known, from truncated version in MS LXIII of the National Library of Scotland; to the complete version, containing 41 couplets, was found by JLC in the Carmichael papers in Edinburgh University Library. Later published with translation in Vol. III of Hebridean Folksongs, p. 132.

CONTRIBUTIONS TO GAIRM

- 1952-3 Vol. 1, pt. 1, 51; pt. 2, 71; 3, 65; 4, 31; Vol. II, 37. Leabhar-Latha Mhgr. Ailein [Fr. Allan McDonald's diary 1897–98, kept in Gaelic in March 1898]
- Vol. 2, p. 71. A' Chaileag Mheallta. True story recorded from Murdo MacKinnon, Isle of Barra, on 5 January 1950.
- ----- p. 271. Dunnchadh Ciobair an Ceann Bharraidh, True story recorded from Neil MacNeil, Barra on 7 April 1951
- 1954 Vol. 3, p. 58. Catriana Nighean Eachainn. True story recorded from Peigi MacRae on 23 May 1951. Translation later published in the Scots Magazine, October 1955.
- 1957 Vol. 5, p. 313. An doigh air an rachadh taigh dubh a thogail. Air innse le Dunnchadh Domhnallach. [The way a black house was built. Recorded from Duncan MacDonald, South Uist. The Well-known Gaelic storyteller, who was a mason himself, on 8 August 1951]
- Vol. 3, p. 360. Mgr. Ailean anns a' Cholaiste. [Passages from Fr. Allan MacDonald's Notebook kept at Valladolid when he was a student, including a diary of Christmas Week 1880] [After 1947 JLC with the help of various friends traced the papers and folklore collections of Fr. Allan MacDonald, which had been missing since his death in 1905]
- 1956 Vol. 4 p. 56. Boidse chon nam Faero. JLC's account of a visit to the Faeroes in May 1955.
- 1957 Vol. 6 p. 37. Eideard Lhuyd agus Archaeologia Britannica.[JLC's account of Edward Lhuyd and his famous book, 1707]
- 1958 Vol. 7 p. 157. Cogadh nan Trosg. [JLC's account of the Cod War with Iceland, sympathetic to Icelandic fishery limits at sea, which it was claimed should apply around the Hebrides.
- --------- p. 369 Litir bho Dhomhnall MacCarmaig d'a Charaid Calum. A Letter from Donald MacCormick [see n.11] to his friend Calum. Discovered by JLC in Donald MacCormick's papers. D.M. is also mentioned in N.8.
- 1960 Vol.8 p. 314. A' Chiad uair a dh'fhag mi Uibhist Air innse le Bean Nill.
- 1963 Vol. 11 p. 313 Anna Nic Iain. Obituary of Miss Annie Johnston in Gaelic by JLC.

CONTRIBUTIONS TO TOCHER

- 1974 No.13 p. 162. Annie and Calum Johnston; an appreciation by JLC. [Annie d.1963 and Calum d.1972] were personal friends and helpers of JLC and well known to folklorists who had anything to do with Barra from Mrs Kennedy Fraser onwards. See Nos. 11 and 22 here]

CONTRIBUTIONS TO THE AMERICAN NEW CATHOLIC ENCYCLOPEDIA

- 1967 Articles on: Gaelic Literature
- 1967 Alexander MacDonald
- 1967 Fr. Allan McDonald
- 1967 Dr. Calum MacLean

CONTRIBUTIONS TO "OUTLOOK"

Outlook was a monthly magazine published at Edinburgh from April 1936 to January 1937, edited by David MacEwen and J.H. Whyte. JLC contributed four of Deonaidh Caimbeul's Gaelic stories which later appeared in SIA SGIALACHDAN, several articles and reviews.

- 1937 Jan: p. 105. Leum Iain Oig ann am Miu'alaidh, Young John's Leap on Mingulay, a story sent to JLC by Donald MacPhee.

CONTRIBUTIONS TO THE COMPANION OF GAELIC STUDIES, Edited by Derick S. Thomson.

- 1938 Articles on: Ada Goodrich Freer [see no.10], Annie Johnston, Calum Johnston, Edward Lhuyd, Donald MacCormick, Fr. Allan McDonald, D.C. MacPherson [see No. 49]

CONTRIBUTION OF THE SECOND EDITION OF THEODOR RESEBERY "MICROBES AND MORALS"

- 1975 English translation of Alexander MacDonald's poem "TINNEAS NA H URCHAID" [The Vexatious Sickness, on the coming of VD to Ardnamurchan in the first part of the eighteenth century, probably brought by workers in the Strontian Mines employed by the York Building Company. See No 28. Apparently this poem had not been translated before]

CYMMRODORION SOCIETY TRANSACTIONS

- 1962 P. 77, The contributions of Edward Lhuyd to the Study of Scottish Gaelic

THE SCOTSMAN

- 1933 January 30. Scottish Gaelic in Canada. [This included a summary of the returns to an attempted census of Gaelic speakers in Cape Breton and Antigonish Country, Nova Scotia, and eastern Prince Edwaard Island, based on a questionnaire sent by JLC to Clergymen of various denominations. In 1949, 1950 and 1951 JLC wrote articles in the Scotsman urging the interest of the Gaelic oral tradition and the creation of a Scottish Folklore Commission for the purpose of recording it comprehensively in time.

THE SCOTS MAGAZINE

- 1935 October. Alexander MacDonald Portrait of a Traditionalist. [118] 1937 The First Printed Gaelic Vocabulary. [Alexander MacDonald's] "Galick and English Vocabulary" prepared for the SPCK and published in 1741. Quoting SPCK Minutes at length.
- 1938 Sept., Oct. A Visit to Cape Breton. [Describes the visit of JLC and his wife to Cape Breton in search of traditional Gaelic songs. The first such visit from Scotland]
- 1944 Sept., Obituary of Roderick MacKinnon, traditional Barra singer.
- 1952 Oct., Obituary of Seonaidh Caimbeul, Uist Gaelic bard.
- 1953 Oct., Highland Links with Nova Scotia.
- 1954 Obituary of Duncan MacDonald, S.U. Gaelic Storyteller.
- 1955 Catriana daughter of Hector [the S.U. seeress]
- 1958 Mrs Kennedy Fraser and Songs of the Hebrides.
- 1968 John Duncan, Amy Murray, Evelyn Benedict, their visits to Fr. Allan McDonald on Eriskay. [Letter] [See also no.27. JLC has other articles and letters published in the Scots Magazine.

THE CAPUCCIN ANNUAL

- 1964 The Catholic Isles of Scotland. The Catholic Church in the Hebrides 1560–1760
- REVIEWS Between 1935 and 1974, inclusive, JLC reviewed 53 books on the Highlands and Islands, their history and their folklore, for the Times Literary Supplement. Of these reviews, the following may be mentioned here:
- 7/1/36 Hugh MacDiarmid's translation of Alexander MacDonald's "Birlinn of Clanranad".
- 6/5/55 F. Fraser Darling, " West Highland Survey"
- 24 April 1959 Calum MacLean, "The Highlands"
- 27 May 1955 Ronald Svensson, "Lonely Isles"
- 14 January 1965 F. Fraser Darling and Morton Boyd, "The Highlands and Islands"
- 14 October 1965 T. Steel, "The Life and Death of St. Kilda"
- 24 September 1964 Rev. J. MacKechnie, ed. "The Dewar MSS" vol.1.

Apart from these, JLC has at times reviewed books for An Gaidheal, the Free Man, the Modern Scot, the New Alliance, the Oban Times, Outlook, the Scotsman, the Stornoway Gazette, and the Tablet, as well as writing articles on such subjects for them. Reviews written by JLC for Scottish Gaelic Studies are included in the list under that heading.

=== Recordings ===
EDIPHONE: 274 recordings made on Barra and Cape Breton in 1937. Most of the airs of the Cape Breton Gaelic songs have been transcribed by the late Seamus Ennis when working for the Irish Folklore Commission. The words were taken down by JLC in Cape Breton. It is hoped to publish this. No machine is available to play these wax cylinders now.

PRESTO DISC RECORDINGS: The first electrical recordings of traditional Gaelicd songs were made by JLC in Barra in 1938, numbering 110. Very important as some of the singers did not survive until the time of tape. Ten songs from these recordings were published by the Linguaphone Co. for the Folklore Institute of Scotland, of which JLC was president, in 1950; see No.22, 32 more Presto disc recordings were made on Canna in 1942, including one of the late Professor John Fraser.

WEBSTER WIRE RECORDINGS: 1202 recordings made between 1949 and 1957, most between 1949 and 1951 when JLC had a Leverhulme Expense Grant . Some made in Nova Scotia.

GRUNDING TAPE RECORDINGS: 602 made between 1957 and 1962.

PHILLIPS PORTABLE TAPE RECORDER: 125 recordings made between 1963 and 1969.

CASSETTE RECORDINGS: Made since 1969. Not yet listed. Most of the wire and tape recordings were made in the southern Outer Hebrides, or from visitors thence to Canna. The reciters who made them, and the help given by collaborators, are described in the Introduction to Hebridean Folksongs Vol. III; transcriptions of the singing of 42 women and 8 men, are represented in the three volumes, which with Angus MacLellan's stories and memoirs and its published in Gairm only represent a fraction of the collection of recordings. Apart from the above recordings, JLC arranged for the making of studio recordings of some of the late Calum Johnston's songs, in Edinburgh in 1948.

=== Entomology ===
Besides a large number of notes in entomological journals, the following articles were published:

- 1936 Scottish Naturalist Nov–Dec. Migrant Lepidoptera in Barra 1936.
- 1938 ---------- Nov–Dec. The Macrolepidoptera of the Parish of Barra.
- 1946 The Entomologist Vol. 79 p. 49. Catalogue of a Collection of Macro-Lepidoptera made in the Hebrides between 1936 and he present date.
- 1951 An Experiment in Marking Migrant Butterflies. ibid., vol.84 p. 1. This showed that such butterflies were constantly moving on.
- 1954 Scottish Naturalist vol.66 p. 101. The Macrolepidoptera of the Island of Canna.
- 1970 Entomologist's Record vol.81 p. 211,235,292. Macrolepidoptera Cannae. Describes 267 species, 16 species have been added since.
- 1975 Vol.87 p. 161. On the Rumoured Presence of the Large Blue Butterfly (Maculinea arion L.) in the Hebrides.
- 1969 Vol.81 p. 117 Rise and decline of Vanessa io in the small Isles (Inner Hebrides). Between 1948 and 1965 Campbell made seven small plantations on the Isle of Canna, adding about 20 more acres to the cover for small birds, moths and butterflies.

== See also ==
- Margaret Fay Shaw
- Carter-Campbell of Possil
