= Ada Goodrich Freer =

British medium, clairvoyant and researcher

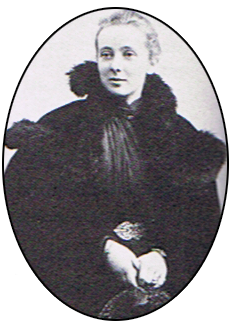
- Goodrich Freer, c. 1900
- Born: May 15, 1857; Uppingham, Rutland, England
- Died: February 24, 1931 (aged 73); New York, U.S.
- Occupations: Spiritualist medium, writer

Ada Goodrich Freer (born 15 May 1857 in Uppingham, Rutland, England, died in New York, 24 February 1931), was a medium, clairvoyant, psychical researcher and author. Much of her work was published under the pseudonym Miss X. Freer was investigated by the Society for Psychical Research and, under strong suspicion of fraud, she was disowned by the Society. She was later caught cheating at a séance and subsequently immigrated to Jerusalem and, later, the United States.

== Early life ==
Ada Goodrich Freer was the daughter of George Freer and Mary, née Adcock. She gave various accounts of her background and age, suggesting connections with Yorkshire and Scottish Highland gentry.

== Society for Psychical Research ==
Freer joined the Society for Psychical Research in 1888 with the support of F. W. H. Myers. After criticism of her work on the Ballechin House case in 1897, her work was repudiated by the SPR and she abandoned psychical research.

== W. T. Stead and Borderland ==
Campaigning journalist William Thomas Stead had become increasingly interested in spiritualism in the 1890s. In 1893 he founded a spiritualist quarterly, called Borderland, in which he gave full play to his interest in psychical research. The focus of the publication was on spiritualism and psychical research, mainly from a supportive point of view. The magazine appeared quarterly, priced 1/6. As with the Review of Reviews, Stead was both proprietor and editor. He employed Freer as assistant editor: she was also a substantial contributor under her usual pseudonym "Miss X". Stead claimed that he was in the habit of communicating with Freer by telepathy and automatic writing. The magazine ceased publication in October 1897.

== Clandon House ==
Freer was involved in the investigation of the Clandon House haunting in 1895, funded by the Marquess of Bute. It was alleged that she reported the stories of the domestic staff rather than her own observations.

== Second sight ==
Freer was commissioned by the SPR in 1894, on the recommendation of F.W.H. Myers, to conduct an enquiry into second sight in the Hebrides in 1894-5, again funded by the Marquess of Bute. Much of her report was taken from Hebridean folklore collector Fr. Allan MacDonald of Eriskay, whom she met on her second visit in 1895. She published reports under own name, in the journal Folklore and elsewhere, but concealed the extent of her outright plagiarism from Fr. MacDonald's research notebooks, which has since been documented and exposed by John Lorne Campbell.

== Ballechin House ==
Freer was involved in the investigation of Ballechin House by the Society for Psychical Research, her report being published jointly by herself and the Marquess of Bute. Her work was strongly criticised by J. Callendar Ross in The Times in 1897, and led to a controversy over the bona fides of the investigators.

== Personal life ==
Historian Trevor H. Hall has argued that Freer was having an affair with F.W.H. Myers at the time that he introduced her to psychic research and the SPR. Trevor Hamilton dismisses this and suggests that Freer was simply using her acquaintance with Myers to gain status in the psychical research movement. Myers supported her socially and possibly financially.

Author John Grant has suggested that Myers was a womanizer who was easily duped and "probably seduced" by Freer." According to Grant, Freer made false claims about herself:

Right at the outset, she deceived [Myers] and many others within the SPR — as to her antecedents: She said she was a descendant of a noble Scottish family; she was, in fact the daughter of a Leicestershire vet. Neither was she, as she asserted, the first female fellow of the Royal Society. And she was not a teenager when Myers met her, as she told everyone, but a thirty-year old woman, having been born in 1857.

Freer lived with Constance Moore, daughter of Canon Daniel Moore (1809–1899) and sister of Aubrey Lackington Moore, from 1880 to 1901. Freer initially lived with the Moore family at Holy Trinity Vicarage, Paddington, and later shared a house with Constance in Bushey Heath. There is evidence that their relationship was sado-masochistic.

She worked as a medium in London, until she was caught cheating at a séance.

In December 1901 Freer went to Jerusalem, Palestine, then part of the Ottoman Empire, where in 1905 she married Dr Hans Henry Spoer, an American scholar of ancient languages: he believed her to be some 17 years younger than her true age. She returned to Britain from 1909 to 1911 while her husband was training for ordination at Lichfield Theological College and they then moved to Cairo. In 1923 they moved to Detroit; in 1926 to Sycamore, Illinois and then to New York where her husband was chaplain to the New York Mission Society.

Freer died in St Luke's Hospital, New York, on 24 February 1931.
