= George Henderson (scholar) =

George Henderson (18 February 1866 – 26 June 1912) was a scholar of Scottish Gaelic.

== Life and works ==
Henderson was born on 18 February 1866 in Heughden, Kiltarlity, Inverness-shire, in Scotland.

He went to Raining's School in Inverness, where he was taught by Alexander MacBain, a lexicographer of Scottish. He then attended the University of Edinburgh, studying English literature, philosophy and Celtic under Donald MacKinnon. He would engage in fieldwork collecting Gaelic lore in South Uist in 1892. He travelled to Vienna in 1893 earning a doctorate. On his return in 1896, he studied at Jesus College, Oxford, and obtained a BLitt on Scottish Gaelic dialects.

He married Ella, the daughter of Alexander Carmichael, in Iffley near Oxford in May 1901, just before his ordination as a Church of Scotland minister in June 1901. He served as a Church of Scotland minister for the parish of Eddrachillis, Sutherland.

Then in 1906, he was appointed lecturer in Celtic at the University of Glasgow, on the recommendation of Kuno Meyer. The most notable works during his tenure were The Norse Influence on Celtic Scotland (1910), and Survivals in Belief among the Celts (1911).

He had in the interim obtained a collection of Gaelic folksongs and tunes from the Isle of Skye, collected by Frances Tolmie, and these were published by the Folksong Society in 1911. The "Fionn Saga" series he published in the Celtic Review (1904–7) included versions he collected orally from Eriskay, with the assistance of Father Allan MacDonald whom he had befriended earlier.

He was an admirer of the work of John Francis Campbell and after Campbells' death in 1885 Henderson started working on Campbells unfinished book The Celtic Dragon Myth, eventually published in 1911. Henderson contributed some translation work, provided an extensively detailed introduction, and completed the editing of the manuscript for its eventual publication.

He died aged 46 in Rutherglen on 26 June 1912.

== List of works ==
Henderson had a large output of published material, although his work was sometimes inconsistent. His principal works include the following:

- (ed.) Dain Iain Ghobha ("Poems of John Morison"; 1893–96), 2 vols., religious Gaelic verse by John Morison (1790-1852).
- Leabhar nan Gleann (1898), a compilation of field work in the Highlands.
- An edition of Fled Bricrend for the Irish Texts Society (1899)
- Publications in Zeitschrift für celtische Philologie 4/5 (1903, 1905) on Scottish Gaelic dialects. (Note: The result of his BLitt at Oxford.)
- "The Fionn Saga" in the Celtic Review 1/2/3 (1904, 1905–6, 1906–7)
- The Norse Influence on Celtic Scotland (1910)
- Survivals in Belief among the Celts (1911)
- Arthurian Motifs in Gadhelic Literature (1912)

He also contributed papers to the Transactions of the Gaelic Society of Inverness.
