= Alexander Macbain =

Scottish philologist (1855–1907)

Alexander MacBain
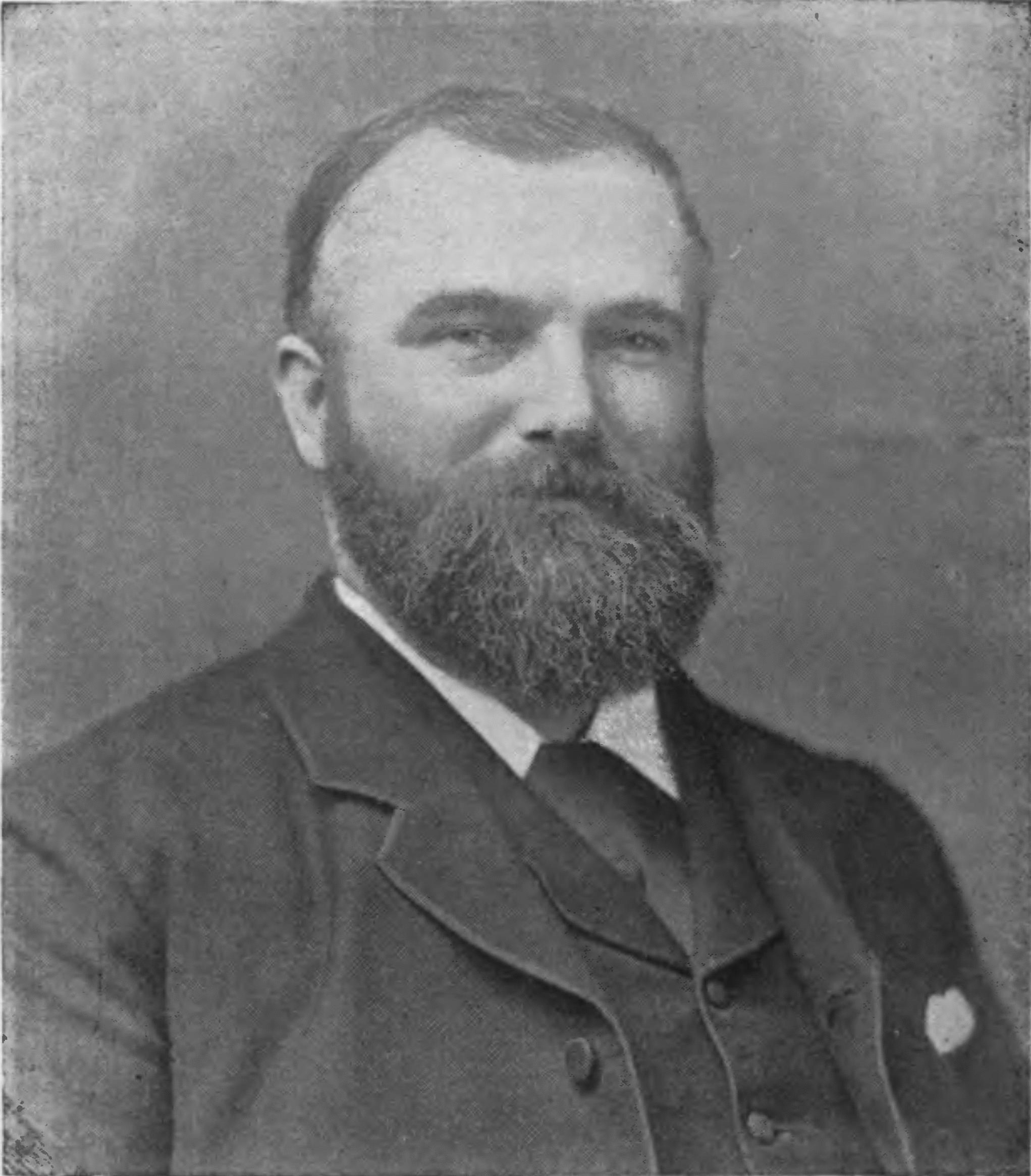
- Born: July 22, 1855; Balguish, Glenfeshie, Scotland (now Badenoch, Inverness-shire, Scotland)
- Died: 4 April 1907 (aged 51); Stirling, Scotland
- Known for: work in Scottish Gaelic linguistics
- Scientific career
- Fields: Celtic studies, linguistics

Alexander MacBain (or Alexander Macbain; 22 July 1855 – 4 April 1907) was a Scottish philologist, best known today for An Etymological Dictionary of the Gaelic Language (1896).

== Early life and education ==
MacBain was born 22 July 1855 at Balguish, Glenfeshie (modern-day Badenoch, Inverness-shire) and grew up in poverty. His parents, John MacBain and Margaret McIntyre were not recorded as married when his birth was registered 9 August 1855. A native Gaelic speaker, he learned English at Insh General Assembly school, five miles from Kingussie, in Badenoch (1863–1870), whose teacher was Alexander Mackenzie. As a teenager, he taught for half a year at the Dunmullie School in Boat of Garten (1870–71), attended Baldow School in Badenoch, was employed by the Ordnance Survey in Scotland and Wales (1871–74) and returned to Baldow School for another term. Having obtained a bursary, MacBain was accepted at Old Aberdeen Grammar School (1874) and subsequently studied at King's College, Aberdeen (1876), where he graduated with an MA in philosophy.

== Professional career ==
In July 1880, MacBain was appointed rector of Raining's school, Inverness, which had just become the secondary school for the entire Highlands. Raining's school became part of the High Public School in 1894-95, for which MacBain continued to work until his death. He was made Legum Doctor at Aberdeen University in 1901 and received his pension in 1905. During the last two decades of his life, MacBain was one of the leading figures in a Gaelic intellectual circle which met in Inverness and Edinburgh. The group included both older members, such as Alexander Nicolson, Alexander Carmichael and Donald Mackinnon, and a younger generation which included Father Allan MacDonald, William J. Watson, George Henderson and Kenneth McLeod. MacBain never married. On 4 April 1907, he died of a cerebral haemorrhage in Stirling. He was buried in his home district Badenoch, in the Rothiemurchus churchyard.

== Scholarly output ==
MacBain was involved in a substantial amount of editorial work. He worked together with Rev John Kennedy to publish the numerous transcripts which the late Rev Dr Alexander Cameron (d. 1888) had made from texts found in manuscripts. The result was the two volumes of Reliquiae Celticae (1892-94). He also published an annotated edition of W. F. Skene's The Highlanders of Scotland (1902) and of the History of the Mathesons by his former teacher Alexander Mackenzie; contributed to an edition of Ewan MacEachen's Gaelic Dictionary; and was editor for Celtic Magazine (1886-1888) and Highland Monthly (1889–1902).

Many individual papers were published in the Transactions of the Gaelic Society of Inverness and Transactions of the Inverness Field Club. His first book was Celtic Mythology and Religion, which appeared in 1885 (reprinted 1917). The work for which he is best known today is the philological milestone An Etymological Dictionary of the Gaelic Language (1896). MacBain published a critical edition of the Book of Deer and contributed entries on the Picts in Chambers's Encyclopaedia, articles for magazines and newspapers and reviews for the Transactions of the Gaelic Society of Inverness (1880–1903). He was responsible for two popular textbooks, Gaelic Reader and, together with John Whyte, How to Learn Gaelic.

MacBain was highly critical of Skene's position of the Pictish language as Q-Celtic in character. It has been suggested that the degree of animosity evident in MacBain's treatment of Skene may have been for personal reasons and that he was biased against him.

Selected publications

- 1883–84. Celtic Mythology and Religion. in Celtic Magazine; published in book form in Inverness, 1885. Available through the Internet Archive here and here.
- 1885. The "Druid" Circles in Transactions of the Gaelic Society of Inverness, vol. XI; published in book form by Eneas Mackay, Inverness, 1914.
- 1885. Ed. and tr. "The Book of Deer." in Transactions of the Gaelic Society of Inverness; vol. XI, pp. 137–66. Available from the Internet Archive
- 1893. Celtic Burial, in Transactions of the Inverness Scientific Society and Field Club, vol. III, Inverness.
- 1895. Personal Names and Surnames of Inverness. Inverness.
- 1896, 1911. Etymological Dictionary of the Gaelic Language. Inverness, 1911 (revised edition, originally published in 1896; reprinted in 1982 by Gairm, Glasgow). Transcribed online at Ceantar.org.
- 1917. Celtic Mythology and Religion, a collection of Celtic Mythology and Religion, The "Druid" Circles, and Celtic Burial. Published in book form by Eneas Mackay, Inverness, 1917. Reprinted by The Lost Library, Glastonbury, no date.
