= Heritage language learning =

Learning one's family's historical heritage language

Heritage language learning, or heritage language acquisition, is the act of learning a heritage language from an ethnolinguistic group that traditionally speaks the language, or from those whose family historically spoke the language. According to a commonly accepted definition by Valdés, heritage languages are generally minority languages in society and are typically learned at home during childhood. When a heritage language learner grows up in an environment with a dominant language that is different from their heritage language, the learner appears to be more competent in the dominant language and often feels more comfortable speaking in that language. "Heritage language" may also be referred to as "community language", "home language", and "ancestral language".

There are different kinds of heritage language learners, such as learners with varying levels of proficiency in the heritage language, and also those who learn a "foreign" language in school with which they have some connection. Polinsky & Kagan label heritage language learners on a continuum that ranges from fluent speakers to individuals who speak very little of their heritage language. Valdés points out that a connection with a heritage language does not have to be made only through direct previous exposure to the language or a certain amount of proficiency in the language. In her conception of heritage language learners, monolingual English-speaking students of Armenian ancestry in the United States could consider themselves to have a heritage language of Armenian. A different definition of heritage language learners or speakers limits the term to individuals who were exposed to the language in early childhood, but who later lost proficiency in the language in favor of adopting the majority language of the community.

Heritage languages can be learned in various contexts, including public school instruction and language courses organized by a community which speaks the particular language during after-school hours or on the weekend. When someone is engaged in informal heritage language learning, they are acquiring a language from a particular ethnolinguistic group that traditionally speaks the language, or from someone whose family historically spoke the language. Formal heritage language instruction occurs inside of a classroom, where learners are taught a language that is being used inside of the home or among members of their own ethnic group. Language programs that include Saturday schools and courses that happen outside of school hours are programs where children are encouraged to further develop and improve their heritage language proficiency.

According to Valdés, the term "heritage language" can be used very broadly and can refer to minority languages which are spoken by what many know as "linguistic minorities". Typically, these heritage languages are endangered or have a high possibility of disappearing soon without intervention, and because of this, there are several communities in the United States that have chosen to work towards maintaining these languages.

== Heritage language vs native language ==
The difference between native language (or First language) and heritage language is an important distinction to make. The term "native language" tends to be associated with acquisition at a very early age and carries with it the notion that a person will achieve a high amount of fluency and proficiency in this language. Typically, the native language is the dominant language for a speaker and this speaker is expected to have natural understanding of not only linguistic knowledge, but also pragmatic and cultural knowledge, as well as skills such as writing creatively, making jokes, and translating. On the other hand, the term "heritage language" is more associated with the language in which proficiency was sacrificed in order to gain proficiency in the dominant language in a particular community. This is not always the case, however, as some speakers of heritage languages have just as much proficiency in that language as in their other language(s).

Heritage language learners differ from other types of language learners. Kagan & Dillon provide us with distinctions among speakers of Russian as a native language, and learners of Russian as a heritage language or a foreign language in the table below. The goal of the research was to distinguish between types of language learners of Russian and to use that information to create a new perspective for instruction. The table explains that students whose native language was Russian had acquired it as a child and used it throughout life with exposure to a full language community of speakers. For the students who learned Russian as a foreign language (L2), there was first an L1 or native language before they began learning Russian, the foreign language, which was typically learned solely outside of the community. Lastly, the heritage speakers of Russian had acquired Russian as an L1, but when they immigrated to the United States, English became their primary language. This left most heritage language students with varying levels of proficiency in their heritage language due to the limited community that spoke Russian.

Language	Native	Foreign	Heritage
L1 or L2 (age)	L1 (child)	L2 (after the first language has been acquired)	L1/L2?
Exposure to target language	Full language community	Outside of community	Limited community

== Acquisition theories ==
Heritage language acquisition theories are highly contested. The most common theory is the Incomplete Acquisition Theory, but other scholars have considered delayed acquisition, variations in input, and cross-linguistic influence as factors that contribute to heritage language speakers' competence. For children who may have acquired a different dialect of the heritage language, they would require a unique type of instruction that may differ from styles of instruction that would be most beneficial for students who experience incomplete acquisition at an early age.

Acquisition theories have been proposed in an attempt to explain why heritage speakers' competence in the heritage language diverges from that of their monolingual peers. Silvina Montrul's research has been foundational to this work. Her Incomplete Acquisition Theory states that heritage speakers do not completely acquire the heritage language before switching to the L2. As attrition can also render a grammar "incomplete", attrition is included in this theory. Multiple researchers have refuted Silvina Montrul's proposal by suggesting that the Incomplete Acquisition Theory does not take into consideration delayed acquisition, input variation, and cross-linguistic influence, all of which factor into language competence.

As research on heritage language learners' acquisition is relatively recent, dating back to the early 2000s, there remains much to be discovered about the process. The following acquisition theories pertain to language learners who have learned, at least partially, the heritage language before switching to the dominant language. For more information on heritage language learners who lack personal experience with the heritage language but have ancestors who spoke the language, see language revitalization.

=== Incomplete Acquisition Theory ===
==== Incomplete Acquisition ====
The Incomplete Acquisition Theory recognizes that complete acquisition of L1 takes place throughout childhood, stretching into the school-age period. Therefore, heritage language learners, who typically switch to the dominant culture's language when they enter school and, consequently, experience a decline in input in the heritage language, do not completely acquire their first language. As heritage language learners are rarely schooled in their L1, they are often orally proficient but illiterate or have underdeveloped written comprehension and production in the heritage language. In treating heritage language learning as interrupted L1 acquisition, in which the learner has access to Universal Grammar, it is expected that heritage language learners have knowledge of concepts found in early stages of L1 development, such as binding constraints, wh-movement, and aspects of lexical semantics, and struggle with grammatical concepts that require sustained exposure and practice in school-aged children, such as specialized vocabulary and uses of the subjunctive in Spanish.

==== Attrition ====
An incomplete grammar may be the result of attrition and fossilization of concepts in the L1 due to insufficient input once the child has switched to the dominant language. Attrition is the loss of, or failure to make full use of, "grammatical knowledge previously acquired". Fossilization occurs when a speaker lets go of non-core grammatical concepts but retains the basic core structure of the language. Attrition and fossilization are considered to be part of the Incomplete Acquisition Theory because they render a language incomplete. However, Pires and Rothman (2009) argue that attrition should be distinguished from the Incomplete Acquisition Theory in future studies because, in instances of attrition, the speakers do, indeed, completely acquire the target grammar as children.

=== Alternative acquisition theories ===
==== Delayed acquisition ====
Delayed acquisition may contribute to the difference in language competence between heritage speakers and monolingual speakers of the same language. Late or delayed acquisition of a language can have "consequences for linguistic, neurological, and cognitive mechanisms" that work to make language acquisition "fast, effortless, and... successful". Flores and Barbosa (2014) studied the clitic placement of heritage speakers of Portuguese living in Germany and concluded that the heritage speakers went through the same stages of acquisition as their monolingual counterparts. However, the process of acquisition was delayed and took longer for the heritage speakers because they had reduced input of the heritage language. Thus, this theory must be considered in conjunction with theories on input variation.

==== Input ====
Theories of acquisition involving variations of input postulate that heritage language learners' production of the heritage language diverges from that of their monolingual peers who speak the same language because the two groups are exposed to different dialects and quantities of input.

===== Dialect variation =====
Theories surrounding dialect variation suggest that errors or deviations from the standard dialect made by a heritage language learner may reflect the acquisition of a non-standard variety or informal register of the heritage language, which include variations on certain properties or the lack of certain properties found in the standard dialect. Heritage language learners are often only exposed to one dialect or colloquial variety of the heritage language, unlike their monolingual peers who interact with a standard monolingual dialect found in formal instruction. Furthermore, certain grammatical properties are only present in the standard dialect or are used infrequently in the colloquial dialect. Pires and Rothaman use the expression, "missing-input competence divergence", to refer to instances when a grammatical property is missing from the colloquial variety.

The dramatic difference between standard and colloquial dialects is particularly evident in cases of verbal morphology, the clitic system, the subjunctive, and inflected infinitives in Brazilian Portuguese. Pires and Rothman (2009) found that Brazilian Portuguese heritage learners do not acquire inflected infinitives because their input does not "robustly instantiate these forms". Similarly, Dominguez (2009) found that deviations in the use and distribution of indicative and subjunctive forms that were in the output of heritage Spanish speakers were also found in the children's input (parental speech).

In certain cases, heritage language learners receive their input from first-generation migrants who have shown effects of attrition in certain domains. Consequently, the language learner would be missing grammatical properties in their input as a result of the interlocutor's attrition and would replicate these errors in their output.

Pires and Rothman (2009) claim that due to their "inborn faculty of language", children automatically acquire the grammar found in their input. Therefore, in conclusion, it is not a deficient ability to acquire the language, but rather, the absence of, or limited access to, certain properties in the child's input that leads to errors in language production. Without access to a standard dialect of the target language often found in formal academic contexts, heritage language learners continue to make these production errors.

===== Quantity of Input =====
Heritage language learners may also have a smaller quantity of input than their monolingual peers because the heritage language is only found in a restricted number of contexts and with fewer interlocutors. Citing statistics found in studies on hearing children with deaf parents, Schiff-Myers (1993) posits that bilingual heritage language learners need a minimum of 5 to 10 hours of interaction per week with the language to develop native-like proficiency. Hours of input may be particularly restricted once the heritage speaker switches to the dominant language.

==== Cross-linguistic influence ====
Cross-linguistic influence may contribute to heritage speakers' competence divergence. Heritage language learners show a tendency to overuse grammatical properties that are found in both the heritage language and the dominant language. Furthermore, heritage language learners may prefer grammatical structures from the dominant language and transfer them into the heritage language. To learn more about language transfer in bilingual individuals, see Crosslinguistic influence.

== Identity and heritage language learning ==
There are many theories across disciplines that seek to explain the relationship between language and identity, but the existence of such a relationship is the common thread. For heritage language learners, when their native or heritage language is not treated as valuable in the classroom, this negatively affects their view of themselves and their mental health. Many minority language speakers' children lose the ability to speak the minority language once they enter the classroom, because of several detrimental factors discussed below. Heritage language learning may help these children regain or avoid losing the ability to communicate with their parents.

Without the ability to communicate with parents or other family members, it becomes difficult to create an identity intertwined with one's heritage culture. In fact, once the heritage language is lost, children may lose the cognitive ability to understand certain concepts or beliefs in their heritage culture. Those who lose the heritage language and choose not to actively maintain its use often assimilate into the dominant culture rather quickly. When heritage language learning does take place, the "standard" language is instructed, and learners whose heritage language is of a different dialect are judged for their variance from the standard. This results in a loss of self-esteem that makes strong self-identity difficult.

One group of heritage language learners includes international adoptees. Some parents that adopt internationally see heritage language learning as a necessary part of the adoptees connection with their own cultural identity, and choose to learn the heritage language along with their child. Though the language is not a heritage language for these parents, it is the language their child might have been brought up in and is a necessary part of "culture keeping", or the act of purposefully ensuring the adopted child holds onto their birth culture.

Another sub-category of heritage language learners are mixed-heritage learners. Studies show that these individuals may have a confused sense of identity because they do not feel that they are fully accepted by either culture. Heritage language learning can be a way to help mixed-heritage individuals connect to the culture of their minority language parent, but these children face several obstacles in pursuing this language, as described in "Detrimental Factors to Heritage Language Learning".

For all heritage language learners, Kondo-Brown suggests that proficiency is positively correlated to both a strong perception of heritage and ethnic identity and a strong community in one's ethnic group. Much research backs this claim. In a study of Japanese heritage language learners, Kondo-Brown found that individuals with one parent speaking the language performed much better in both grammatical knowledge, and various self-assessment tools than those without a parent speaking Japanese. Individuals in this same study with either one Japanese speaking grandparent, or only being of Japanese descent performed on the same level, below those with one Japanese speaking parent. Kondo-Brown attributes this difference to variance in sense of ethnic identity.

== Contexts of heritage language learning ==
=== Overview: Before a learning program begins ===
Heritage language learning is generally an effort to recover one's cultural identity, and is therefore linked to the language loss experienced by immigrant and indigenous populations. Immigration and colonialism around the world have created communities of people who speak languages other than the dominant language at home. Their minority status means that they must navigate the effects of linguistic difference, and the expression of culture, ethnicity, and values through language. Heritage learners often cite a desire to connect with their cultural heritage as a major motivation for studying their heritage language. They may also be motivated by the global prominence and potential career advantages of some heritage languages. As both major immigrant destinations and exporters of the world's dominant language, the United States, Canada, Western Europe, and Australia are home to large populations of heritage language speakers. Indigenous populations in Australia and the Americas also teach their own languages as heritage languages, attempting to revitalize them after the effects of colonial occupation.

=== Immigration situation different in various countries, dialects ===
The distribution of immigrant languages around the world largely reflects immigration patterns; for example, Spanish and Chinese are more likely to be taught as heritage languages abroad. The language profile of a single immigrant community can also vary due to the presence of different dialects. This variation in dialects and even writing systems can be another obstacle in meeting community needs. Ebb and flow in a country's immigrant populations can also lead to significant variation in the abilities of heritage learners in a single classroom. A study conducted by the National Heritage Language Resource Center (UCLA) shows that in the United States, heritage speakers' interest in their home language tends to wane as they enter school, but may rise again in the later teenage years, prompting the decision to study it in college.

=== Obstacles within revitalization programs for indigenous heritage learners ===
The study and teaching of indigenous heritage languages stands at odds with colonial governments' earlier attempts at forced cultural assimilation. The process of language loss accelerated by colonial policies and practices means that many indigenous languages are faced with the threat of extinction, and the effort to teach them as heritage languages intersects with broader language revitalization projects. While learners of immigrant languages are likely to have at least partial knowledge of their language from an early age, indigenous language learners may never have spoken their languages before they began learning them in a formal setting. Education in these languages is further complicated by social stigma, and the feelings of shame or inadequacy that some indigenous people may associate with their language due to colonial intervention. Adult speakers coming from a legacy such as that of Canada's residential schools (a project for assimilating indigenous peoples), whose negative psychological effects have been reported by Canada's Truth and Reconciliation Commission, may be unable or unwilling to pass their language on to their children.

== Heritage language pedagogy ==
Heritage language learners have widely varying circumstances and educational needs that set them apart from foreign language learners. They may have little to no understanding of the language, or be able to speak but not read or write it. Formal education in heritage languages has existed since the nineteenth century, in immigrant communities and private and religious schools. Heritage languages did not attract the attention of public education and universities until the concept of heritage language itself began to emerge as a separate field from foreign language learning. Heritage languages are also referred to as community, ethnic, ancestral, minority, or non-official languages, but the term heritage language appears to have originated with Canadian programs of this type.

=== Methods ===
When designing heritage language curricula and teaching methods, linguists and educators attempt to address the ways in which heritage learners are unique. In contrast to the teaching of foreign languages, heritage language teaching methods place more emphasis on literacy and experiential, content-based approaches. Because cultural identity is a definitive part of heritage language learning, languages are often taught alongside cultural practices. Teaching heritage languages is not limited to the classroom; it may be a part of other local community contexts, such as a volunteer work and internships, field trips, oral history projects, or Scout troops.

=== Heritage and foreign language teaching ===
One question facing heritage language programs is the relationship of heritage language learners to foreign language learners of that same language. The two types of students have different educational, cultural, and psychological backgrounds, which can lead to uneven learning outcomes if they are taught together. Heritage language learners can be taught in entirely separate programs from foreign language learners, or in courses where different types of learners are integrated to varying degrees. They may also be taught alongside their foreign language counterparts with no distinction between them, as is usually the case in college language courses.

== Detrimental factors to heritage language learning ==
American immigrants often end their pursuit of heritage language learning after two or three generations in the United States, and it is now becoming more common to shift into English within two generations. The decision to end heritage language learning can stem from a variety of factors, but often includes societal pressure to use the dominant language. Some L2 speakers view the dominant language as superior or associate it with higher class society, and prefer it to their heritage language, or believe it will lead them to greater opportunity than their native tongue. Some parents discourage use of the heritage language in the home because of a fear that their children will have a harder time learning the dominant language if they are also learning another language. This belief is not supported by research. Research by Yan and Elena (as cited in Yilmaz 2016) showed better performance in bilinguals as compared to monolinguals in metalinguistic ability, pragmatics, and attention control. This and other research actually points to Cognitive advantages of bilingualism including greater cognitive ability and mental flexibility.

Practical limitations to heritage language learning are also possible, and can include limited access to resources for heritage language learning, and limited materials in the heritage language. A combination of a social and practical limitation, classrooms may also discourage the use of minority languages by students during instruction.

In the sub-population of mixed-heritage learners, there may other stigmas that contribute to the loss of heritage language learning. If it is not widely accepted to marry outside of their culture, and individuals decide to do so anyhow, they may lose contact with their ethnic community upon marriage. This leaves them without access to a community of speakers in their heritage language. Their children now have little access to one parent's native language, and little opportunity to pursue heritage language learning.

Although heritage language learning can be important in many cases, the stakes are particularly high when the language is near extinction. In some cases, the active pursuit of heritage language learning is necessary to keep a minority languages alive, yet there may be limited learning materials and resources to do so. The language of the Cherokee people in North Carolina and in the Cherokee Nation in Oklahoma fits into this category. In these situations, it is also likely that there is limited access to social communities of native speakers to communicate with. Without this natural input as well as pedagogical input, speakers may not achieve the fluency needed to keep the language alive, and the minority language may be lost.

== See also ==
- Heritage language
- Immigrant language
- Indigenous language
- Language education
- Language imperialism
- Prestige language
- Second language acquisition
