= Colonia =

Colonia may refer to:

== Arts and entertainment ==
- Colonia (group), a Croatian dance music group
- Colonia (Autopsia album), 2002
- Colonia (A Camp album), 2009
- Colonia (film), a 2015 historical romantic thriller

== Places ==
- Colonia (Roman), a Roman Empire outpost in conquered territory to secure it, and later the highest status of Roman city
- Colonia del Sacramento, Uruguay
  - Colonia Department
- Colonia, Federated States of Micronesia
- Colonia, New Jersey, U.S.
- Colonia, Oxnard, California, U.S.
- Colonia, Tritenii de Jos, Cluj County, Romania
- Colonia (Mexico), a type of neighborhood in a Mexican city
- Colonia (United States), a type of community along the U.S.–Mexico border
- Colonia Claudia Ara Agrippinensium, the Roman colony from which the German city of Cologne developed

== Other uses ==
- Colonia (Madeira), a historical property law regime law unique to Madeira
- Colonia (surname), including a list of people with the name
- Colonia (ship), a cable vessel that worked on the All Red Line
- Colonia (bird), a genus of birds

== See also ==
- Colony (disambiguation)
- Kolonia (disambiguation)
- Koloneia (disambiguation)
- Kolonjë (placename)
- Cologne, a city in Germany, originally Colonia Claudia Ara Agrippinensis
- Colonia Dignidad, a colony of Germans and Chileans in post-World War II Chile
- Kolonia, in the Federated States of Micronesia
