= Colony (disambiguation) =

A colony is a territory governed by people from another country.

Colony may also refer to:

== Biology ==
- Colony (biology), group of individual organisms of the same species living closely together

== Places in the United States ==
- Colony, Alabama
- Colony, Kansas
- Colony, Missouri
- Colony, Oklahoma
- Colony, Lexington, a neighborhood in southwestern Lexington, Kentucky
- The Colony, Texas
- Colony Township, Adams County, Iowa
- Colony Township, Delaware County, Iowa
- Colony Township, Greeley County, Kansas
- Colony Township, Knox County, Missouri

== Arts, entertainment, and media ==
=== Film ===
- Colony (2010 film), a documentary about beekeepers and colony collapse disorder
- Colony (2026 film), a South Korean zombie film
- The Colony (1995 film), an American made-for-television thriller starring John Ritter
- The Colony (1996 film), an American made-for-television thriller starring Michael Paré
- The Colony (2007 film), a Canadian short film by Jeff Barnaby
- The Colony (2013 film), a Canadian science fiction horror film starring Laurence Fishburne
- The Colony (2015 film) or Colonia, a drama starring Emma Watson and Daniel Brühl
- A Colony, a 2018 Canadian French-language film starring Émilie Bierre
- The Colony, also known as Tides, a 2021 German-Swiss science fiction thriller film

=== Literature ===
- Colony (Buffy novel), based on the Buffy the Vampire Slayer television series
- Colony (Grant novel), by Rob Grant
- "Colony" (short story), by Philip K. Dick
- The Colony (novel), 2025 novel by Annika Norlin

=== Music ===
- Colony (album), a 1999 album by In Flames
- "Colony", a song by Joy Division on the album Closer
- "Colony", a song by Susumu Hirasawa on the 1995 album Sim City

=== Television ===
- Colony (TV series), a 2016 American television series on USA Network
- The Colony (2005 TV series), 2005 reality television series set in historical Australia
- The Colony (American TV series), 2009 Discovery Channel reality television series set in a post-apocalyptic US
- "Colony" (The X-Files), episode from the television series The X-Files
- "The Colony", an episode from the television series Voltron: Legendary Defender

=== Video games ===
- Colony (video game), 1987 computer game by Mastertronic
- The Colony (video game), 1988 computer game by Mindscape

== Brands and enterprises ==
- Colony (restaurant), London, England
- Colony Brands, an American mail-order and electronic retail company
- The Colony (restaurant), New York City (1923–1971)
- The Colony Room Club, a club in London (1948-2008)

== Other uses ==
- a body of people who have gathered to live near each other, e.g. an artists' colony
- Colony (fraternity or sorority), a probationary chapter of a national fraternity or sorority
- Colony (Poland), a type of settlement in Poland
- Colony (Russian Empire), a type of settlement in the Russian Empire with an invited foreign population
- Colony Club, a social club in New York City, New York, USA
- Colony Framework, an open source plugin framework specification
- Colony High School, Ontario, California
- Colony houses, model housing developments in Edinburgh
- Colony-class frigate, a class of frigates built in the United States for the British Royal Navy during World War II
- The Colony (Bennachie), a former squatters' community near Aberdeen, Scotland
- The Colony (professional wrestling), professional wrestling stable in Chikara
- Horatio Colony (1900–1977), American poet and novelist
- Jim Colony, American sports news announcer

== See also ==
- Colony House (disambiguation)
- Colonia (disambiguation)
- Colonie (disambiguation)
