= Ara trium Galliarum =

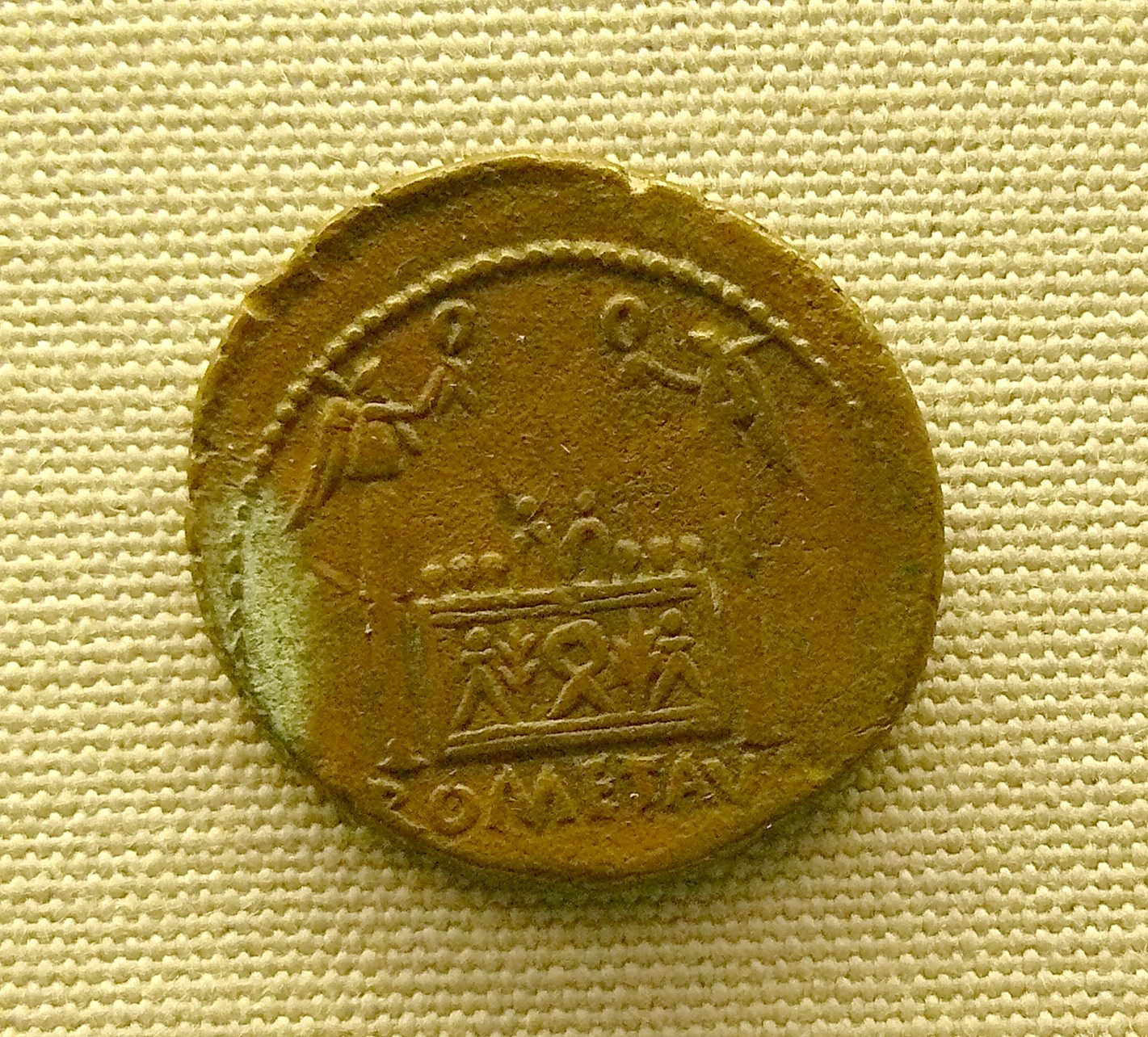
Dupondius with illustration of the Ara trium Galliarum.

The Ara trium Galliarum, or ‘Altar of the three Gallic provinces’, was a Roman sanctuary near Lugdunum (today Lyon in France). The altar was consecrated to the goddess Roma and Augustus.

In the 2nd decade of the 1st century BC, Drusus built the ritual place as part of the preparation for his offensive in Germania. Once a year on August 1 the Concilium provinciae, the province council of the Gallic provinces, met at that place. The main function of the council was to sacrifice to the Roman Emperor (see imperial cult), elect a priest of Rome and Augustus for the coming year, and arrange public games. In this way, the Gallic tribes demonstrated their allegiance to Rome.

Analogous to the Ara trium Galliarum was the Ara Ubiorum, constructed in Colonia Claudia Ara Agrippinensium (modern Cologne) for the Germanic provincial council.
