= Jan Daemen Cool =

Dutch Golden Age painter

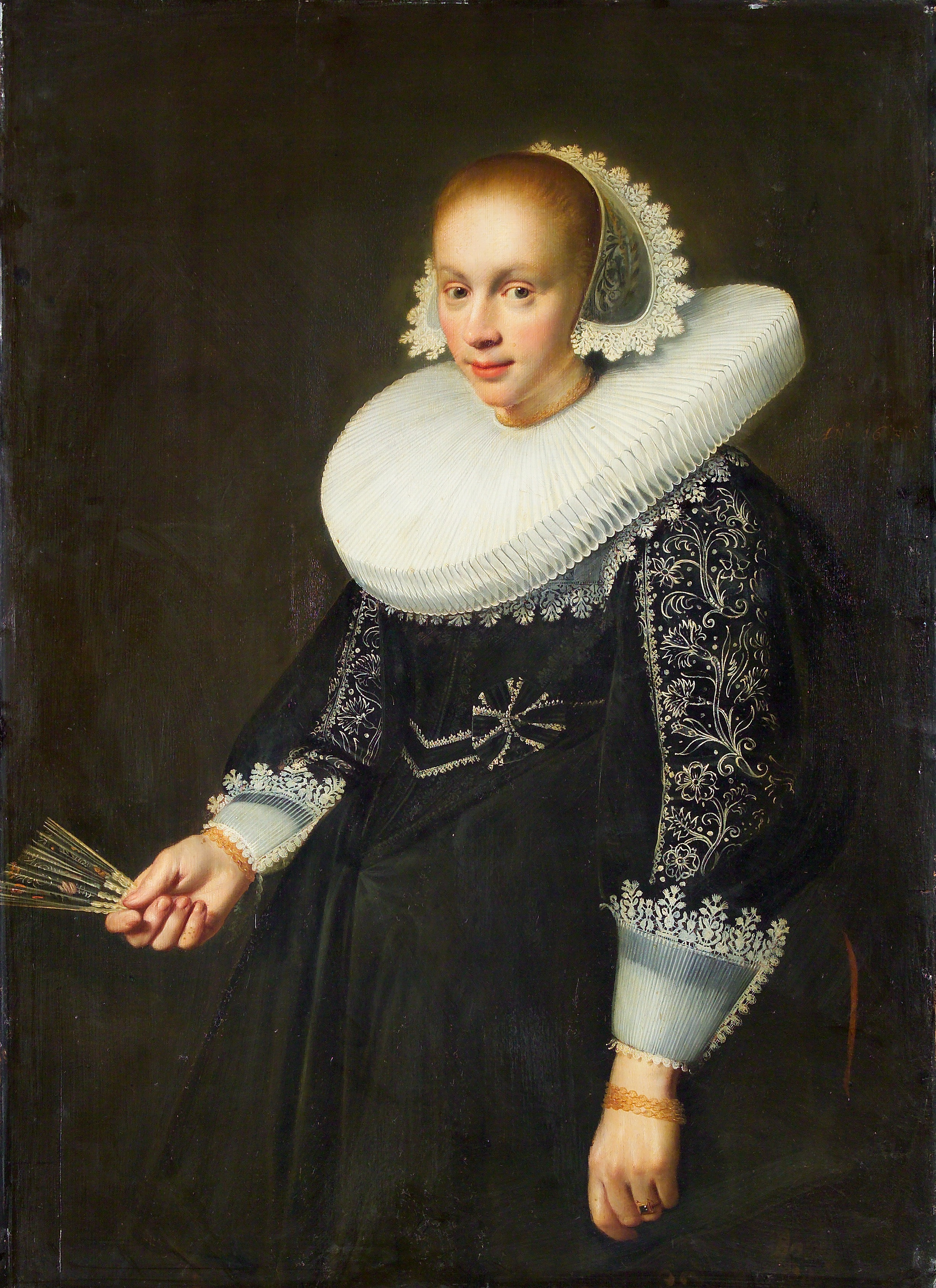
Portrait of an unknown lady, 1636.

Jan Daemen Cool (1589, Rotterdam – 1660, Rotterdam), was a Dutch Golden Age painter.

== Biography ==
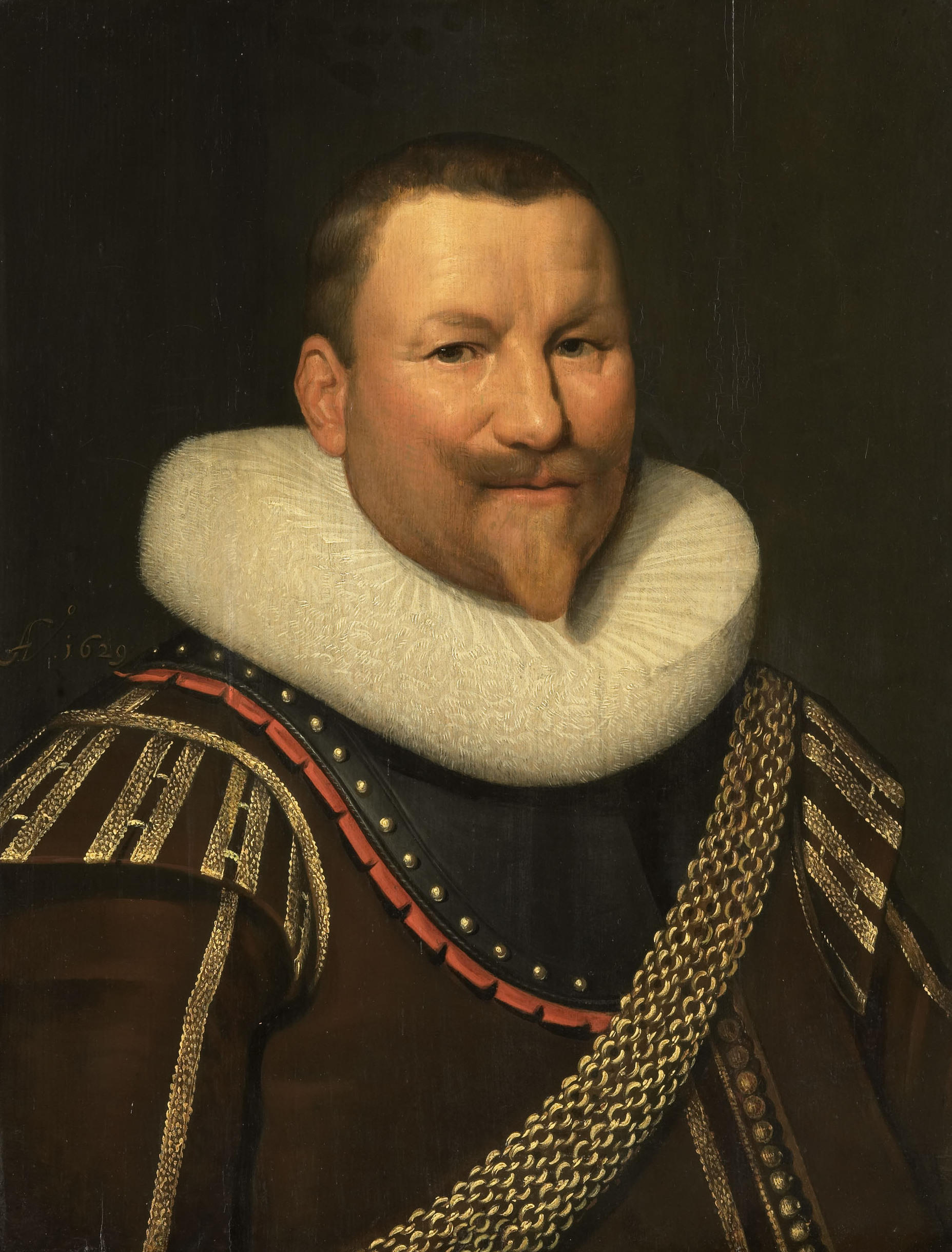
Portrait of Piet Pieterszoon Hein, 1629 copy after a lost 1625 original by Daemen.

According to the RKD he was probably a pupil of the painter Daemen Cool. He married in Delft in 1613 to Agniesje Jaspersdr. In 1614, he was admitted into the Guild of St. Luke at Delft; but by 1618 he had returned to Rotterdam, and in 1623 he married Lysbeth, the widow of the painter Lowys Percelles. He is known as a follower of Michiel Jansz. van Mierevelt and made dated portraits. He influenced the painters Adam and Isaac Colonia and Ludolf de Jongh.

== Works ==
In 1652 the governors of the " Old Men's Home" at Rotterdam agreed to receive him into the institution on condition of his paying a sum of 1225 florins and painting a picture representing them assembled together. Cool died there in 1660, and was buried in the church of the institution. The work, which he executed in accordance with the agreement, was the only one known to be by him when Michael Bryan was writing; and it had been shortly before that reattributed to him. Lamme ascribed it to Aart Mytens; Bürger gave it to Jacob Backer; and it is attributed to Daniel Mytens, the elder, by the catalogue, of 1867, of the Rotterdam Museum, where it has been since its removal from the Old Men's Home in 1849. It is dated 1653, and represents 'Five Governors, clothed in black, ranged round a table.' (See Obreen's ' Archief voor Nederlandsche Kunstgeschiedenis,' vol. I.)

Today several of his works hang in the Historisch Museum Rotterdam.
