= Ballechin Wood =

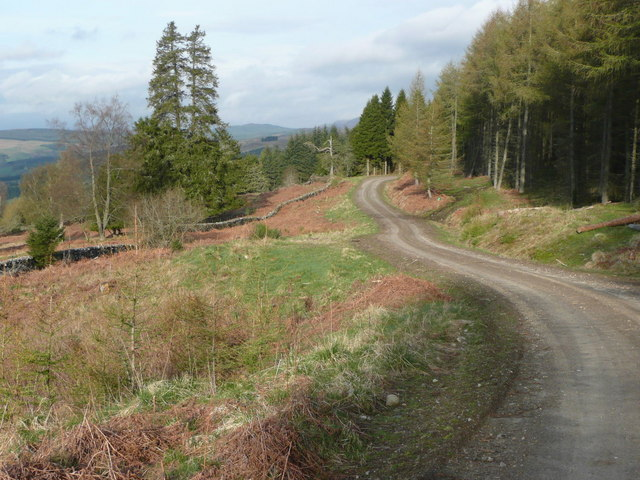
- A forest track at the southern edge of the wood

- Location within Perth and Kinross Location within Scotland
- Interactive map of Ballechin Wood

Geography
- Location: Perth and Kinross, Scotland
- Coordinates: 56.67392528°N 3.736030303°W

Ballechin Wood is a large coniferous forest site, around 805 acres (326 ha) in area, located above Ballechin in Perth and Kinross, Scotland. It is located a short distance northwest of where the River Tay and River Tummel merge at Balmacneil and around 2 miles (3.2 km) south of Pitlochry. The wood merges into Clunie Wood to the northwest and Logierait Wood to the southeast.

Ballechin House formerly stood in the forest, accessed from the A827 Ballinluig-to-Grandtully road.

The wood is maintained by the Scottish Forest Commission.
