= Adam de Colone =

Dutch painter

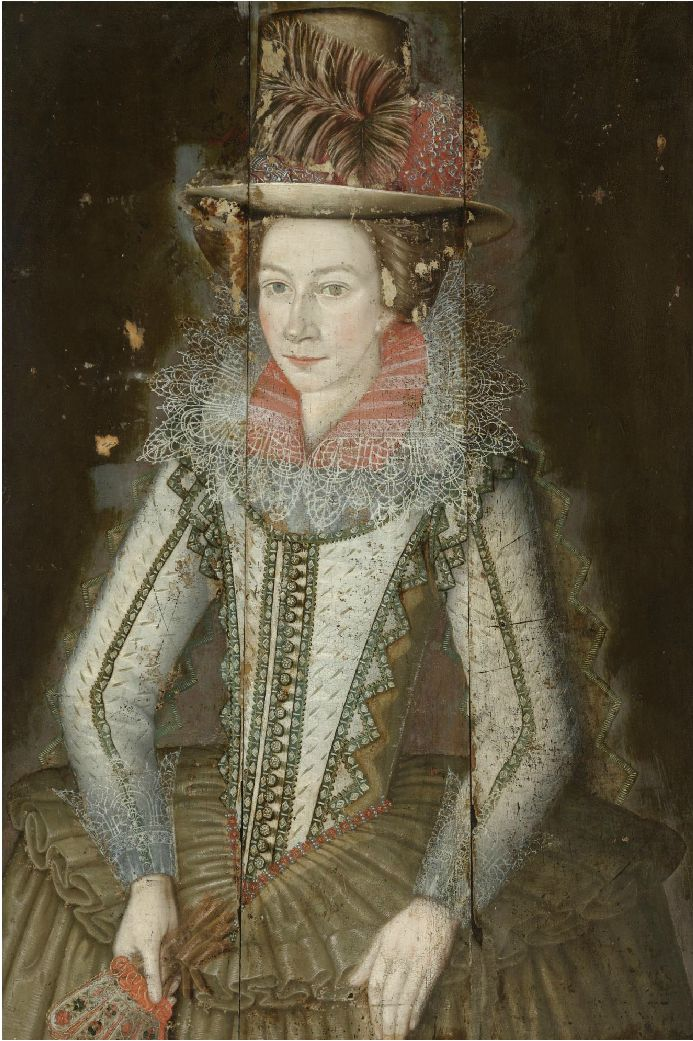
"Portrait of a Lady"

Adam de Colone, or Adam Louisz. de Colonia (c. 1572 in Antwerp – buried 19 August 1651 in Rotterdam), was a Dutch Golden Age painter active in Scotland during the reigns of James VI and I and Charles I of England.

== Biography ==
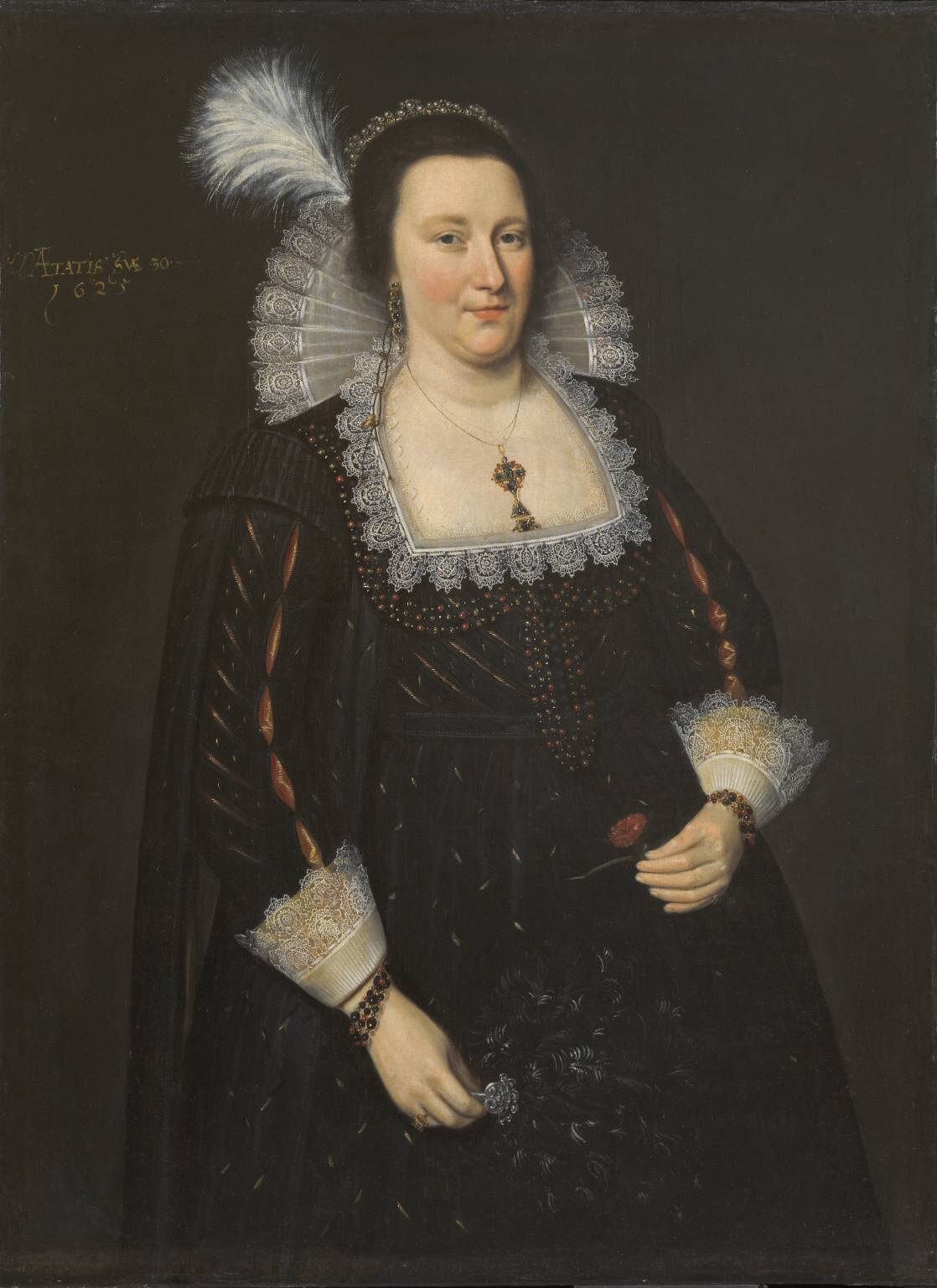
Lady Margaret Livingstone, Second Countess of Wigtown, married to John Fleming, 2nd Earl of Wigtown

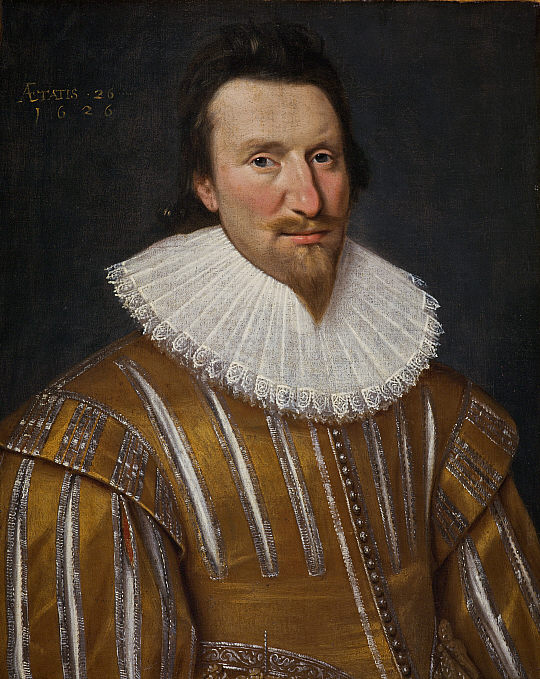
James Erskine, 6th Earl of Buchan

It has been assumed that Adam was the son of the King's Painter in Scotland, Adriaen van Sonne (Vanson) and his wife Susanna de Colonia. However, more recent research reveals, according to the Netherlands Institute for Art History, that Adam was the brother of Susanna de Colonia, and they were the children of an Antwerp saddle maker Louis Jansz Colonia. Adam painted under the name Adam de Colonia in Rotterdam in the 1630s. Accordingly, Adrian Vanson, court painter to James VI, was Adam's brother-in-law. Adrian was originally from the Netherlands though all his children were born in Edinburgh.

Adam is presumed to have studied in the Low Countries, in 1598 he joined the guild in Dordrecht, and was presumably already active as a painter in 1593 in Rotterdam when he married. He was father of the painter Isaac Colonia (1611-1663) and grandfather of Adam Colonia (1634-1685). He moved to London in 1622 and settled in Scotland in 1624. Working at the Court in Whitehall he painted at least two full-length portraits of James VI in 1623, and many of the Scottish nobility. He was paid for London portraits by James I in 1623. (It is unclear if Adam joined his sister in Edinburgh before 1620.)

The earliest portrait of a Scottish sitter recognized as Adam's work is dated 1622, though his portrait of Sir William Stewart of Grandtully (1567-1646) is dated 1613. Most of his works have painted inscriptions showing distinctively shaped letters and numerals. A record of payments in 1628 by George Seton, 3rd Earl of Winton for portraits is preserved;

Item gevine to Adame the painter for my Lord Errol, my Lady Hay, and James Maxwells portraits, 86 lib. 13b s. 4 d.
Item, gevine to Adame the painter for my aune portraitte gevine to my sister (Isobel Seton), 40 lib.

The Copenhagen Museum displays a picture by him of 'Noah building the Ark'; and the Lille Museum has 'The Angel appearing to the Shepherds' attributed to him.
