= Kolony =

Kolony may refer to:

- Kolony, a Malaysian social networking service from Celcom
- Steve Aoki Presents Kolony, also known as Kolony, the fourth studio album by EDM artist Steve Aoki

== See also ==
- Colony (disambiguation)
