= Colonia (surname) =

Colonia is a surname. Notable people with the surname include:

- Adam Colonia (1634–1685), Dutch painter
- Gregorio Colonia (born 1963), Filipino weightlifter
- Isaac Colonia (1611–1663), Dutch painter
- Nestor Colonia (born 1992), Filipino weightlifter, nephew of Gregorio
- Sarita Colonia (1914–1940), Peruvian folk saint
