= Colony class =

Colony class may refer to:

- Colony-class frigate, 21 frigates of the US Tacoma-class frigate loaned to the Royal Navy in World War II and given names of minor British colonies
- Crown Colony-class cruiser, 11 light cruisers of the Royal Navy launched in the 1930s given the names of major colonies of the UK and generally known as the Fiji class.

== See also ==
- Colony (disambiguation)
- Class (disambiguation)
