= The Colonies =

The Colonies may refer to:

- The colonies of the British Empire
  - The Thirteen Colonies founded in North America which became the United States
    - A joking nickname for the present-day United States

== See also ==
- Colony (disambiguation)
