= Colonia Claudia =

Colonia Claudia (Latin for "Claudian colony") may refer to:

- Colonia Claudia Ara Agrippinensium, the Roman settlement at Cologne
- Colonia Copia Claudia Augusta Lugdunum, the Roman settlement at Lyon
- Colonia Claudia Caesarea, the Roman settlement at Cherchell
- Colonia Claudia Victricensis, the Roman settlement at Colchester
- Colonia Claudia Savariensum, the Roman settlement at Szombathely
