= Colony House (Keene, New Hampshire) =

Historic house in New Hampshire, United States

- U.S. National Register of Historic Places
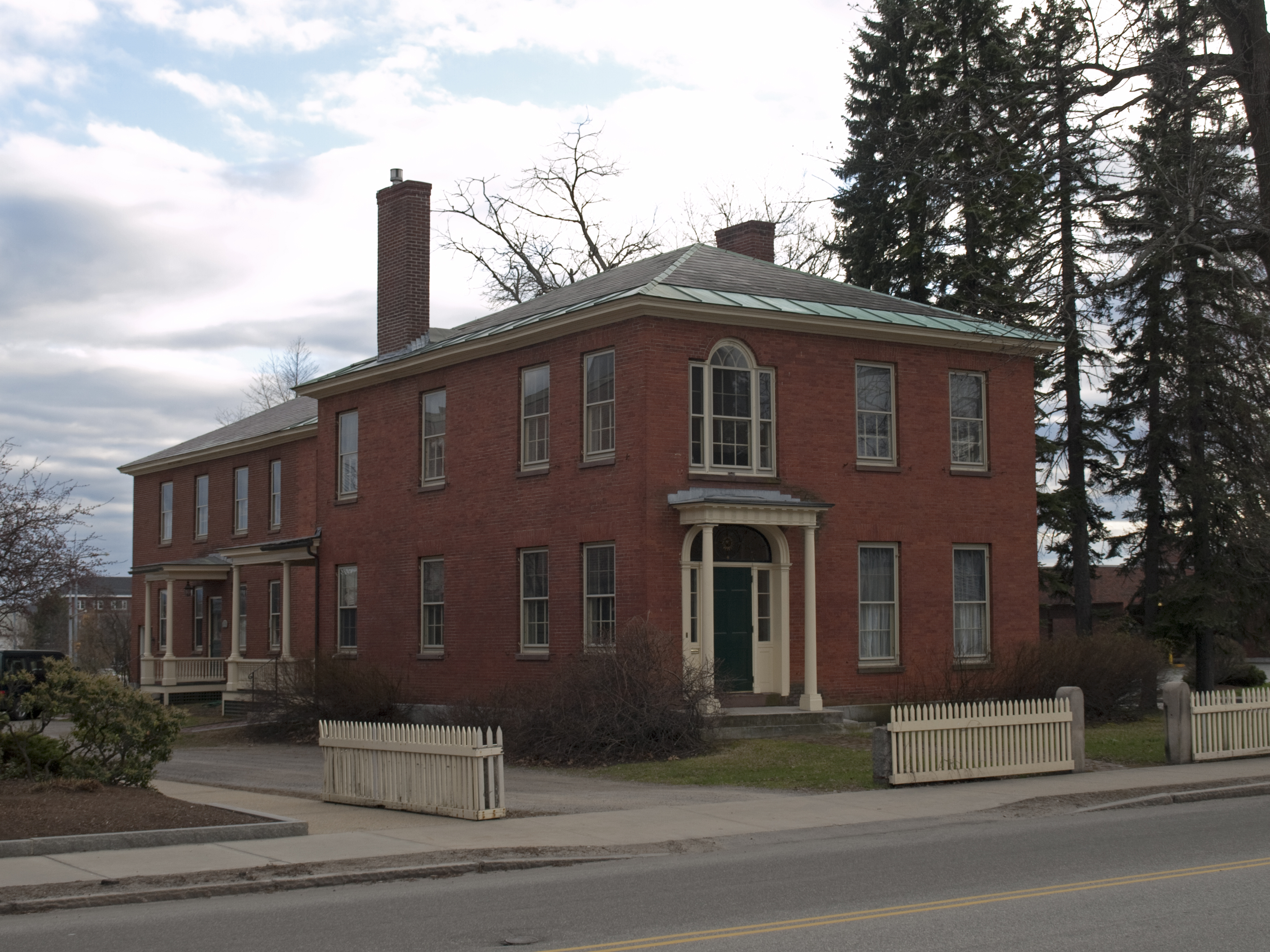

- Location within New Hampshire Location within the United States
- Location: 104 West St., Keene, New Hampshire
- Coordinates: 42°56′5″N 72°16′56″W
- Area: less than one acre
- Built: 1819
- Built by: Timothy Hall
- Architectural style: Early Republic
- NRHP reference No.: 05000969
- Added to NRHP: September 9, 2005

The Colony House is a historic house at 104 West Street in Keene, New Hampshire. Built in 1819 and enlarged about 1900, it is a good example of Federal period architecture, and is notable for its association with Horatio Colony, a prominent local businessman and the city's first mayor. The house, now operated as a bed and breakfast inn, was listed on the National Register of Historic Places in 2005.

== Description and history ==
The Colony House is located a few blocks west of Keene's central green, at the southeast corner of West Street and School Street. It is a brick two story structure with a hip roof. The exterior has modest Federal styling, predominantly in its main entry, with half-length sidelight windows topped by a half-oval fanlight and sheltered by a modest portico. The interior of the building has well-preserved woodwork that took its inspiration from the publications of Asher Benjamin. A c. 1900 addition to the rear emulates the style and building materials of the original block.

The oldest portion of the house, its front block, was built in 1819 by Timothy Hall, a local merchant. The house was purchased in 1863 by Horatio Colony, in whose family it remained for a century. Colony was a lawyer who became involved in the local textile industry, eventually becoming president of the Cheshire Mills in Harrisville. When Keene received its city charter in 1874, he was elected its mayor, serving two terms. The Colony family, including Colony's grandson Horatio Colony II, owned the property until 1966. Between 1974 and 1991 it housed the Historical Society for Cheshire County headquarters and museum. Threatened with demolition, it was repurchased by a Colony descendant in 2001, and is now operated as a bed and breakfast.

== See also ==
- National Register of Historic Places listings in Cheshire County, New Hampshire
