= Ballechin House =

Estate home in Perthshire, Scotland

Coordinates: 56°39′42.14″N 3°44′18.61″W

Ballechin House pre-1964

Ballechin House was a Georgian estate home near Grandtully, Perthshire, Scotland. It was built in 1806, on the site of an old manor house which had been owned by the Steuart family since the 15th century. This house, which stands in Ballechin Wood, is the subject for a popular local ghostlore story.

== History ==
In 1834, Major Robert Steuart (1806–1876) inherited the house and rented it to tenants whilst he served in the Indian Army.

== Ghostlore ==
During his time in India, Steuart came to believe in reincarnation and transmigration. He returned to the house in 1850 and lived there with numerous dogs: he is reported to have stated that he would return in the form of a dog. Major Steuart was unmarried, but local gossip linked his name with that of his much younger housekeeper who died there in 1873. After the Major's death, the house was inherited by his nephew John Skinner who assumed the name Steuart. Fearing that his uncle would reincarnate in the form of one of his dogs, the new owner reportedly shot them all. From this story came the legend that Robert Steuart was forced to haunt the house as a disembodied spirit. The first reported haunting at the house took place in 1876; the witness was a maid in the house.

== Society for Psychical Research investigation ==
In 1897 an investigation of the house was organized by John Crichton-Stuart, 3rd Marquess of Bute, with the assistance of paranormal researchers from the Society for Psychical Research. Ballechin House was known as "The Most Haunted House in Scotland", with several similarities to the Borley Rectory haunting, including the alleged apparition of a ghostly nun. The team of investigators from the Society for Psychical Research included Colonel Lemesurier Taylor and the notorious Ada Goodrich Freer. In 1899, The Alleged Haunting of B---- House by Crichton-Stuart and Freer was published, and serialised in The Times, containing a journal of the phenomena kept by Freer.

J. Callender Ross who had stayed at the house stated in The Times that there was no evidence for any supernatural disturbances and considered the whole investigation to be fraudulent. The SPR later removed material from a volume of their Proceedings on the investigation and denounced Freer. Psychical researcher Frederic W. H. Myers who was originally supportive of the investigation wrote in a letter to The Times he "greatly doubt[ed] whether there was anything supernormal" at the house.

Trevor H. Hall revealed that Freer was an unreliable investigator, had deceived the SPR, plagiarised material and lied about her own life.

Ballechin House was uninhabited by 1932, and most of the house was demolished in 1963, after a fire, leaving only the former servants quarters and outbuildings. Also lost was art work and furniture which had been collected by generations of the Steuart family, including many pieces from the far east, reflecting successive lairds' involvement in the British East India Company and the Scottish Indian company Jardine Skinner, owned by John Skinner Steuart and the Jardine family.
