= Strathtay =

Coordinates: 56.659669°N 3.778142°W

Strathtay: Scottish Gaelic: Srath Tatha
- Location within Perth and Kinross
- OS grid reference: NN911534
- Council area: Perth and Kinross
- Country: Scotland
- Sovereign state: United Kingdom
- Post town: PITLOCHRY
- Postcode district: PH9
- Dialling code: 01887
- Police: Scotland
- Fire: Scottish
- Ambulance: Scottish
- UK Parliament: Angus and Perthshire Glens
- Scottish Parliament: Perthshire North

Strathtay is a small rural village on the River Tay in Perthshire, Scotland. It is part of the Grandtully and Strathtay Conservation Area. Neighbouring Grandtully is situated on the other side of the Tay, across Grandtully Bridge.

Strathtay is a particularly attractive village in Highland Perthshire, very much shaped by the Scottish feu system, which has led to a prevalence of Victorian architecture and landscaping. The village has many stone houses with large, mature gardens containing oak, beech, and monkey-puzzle trees and rhododendrons. J. M. Barrie is known to have spent summer holidays at Beechwood in Strathtay.

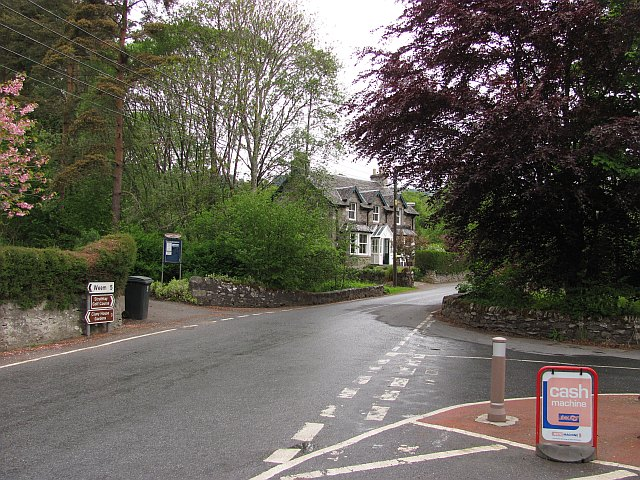
Strathtay
