= Koloneia =

Koloneia (Greek: Κολώνεια, a hellenization of the Latin Colonia) can refer to:

- Koloneia on the Lykos in Pontus, a Byzantine military centre and metropolitan bishopric
- Koloneia (theme), a Byzantine province centered in and named after the above
- Koloneia in Cappadocia, a Byzantine aplekton and bishopric
- Koloneia, the Greek name of Kolonjë District in Albania

== See also ==
- Kolonjë (placename)
- Kolonia, in the Federated States of Micronesia
