= Concilium provinciae =

A Concilium provinciae (Latin for 'Provincial council', known in Greek as a koinon) was an assembly of delegates from all the settlements and cities in a Roman province, which met once a year in the capital of the relevant region in order to celebrate a festival in honour of the goddess Roma, a divine personification of the Roman state. These festivities were led by a flamen, a priest, who was chosen annually by the assembly.

In addition to this ceremonial and religious aspect, the Concilium provinciae also provided a venue for the local aristocracy and political elite to deliberate on internal concerns and problems of the province or to choose delegations to communicate local concerns to Rome.

== See also ==
- Ara trium Galliarum - Provincial council of the Gallic provinces.
- Ara Ubiorum - Provincial council of the Germanic provinces

== Bibliography ==
- Jürgen Deininger: Die Provinziallandtage der römischen Kaiserzeit von Augustus bis zum Ende des dritten Jahrhunderts n. Chr. Beck, München 1965.
