= Segimundus =

Julius Segimundus was a nobleman of the Germanic Cherusci, a son of Segestes who was a close ally of the Roman Empire. They were followers of the imperial cult of Augustus. In this context, Segimundus worked as a high priest at the Ara Ubiorum, a sanctuary in Colonia Claudia Ara Agrippinensium, near Cologne, Germany.

After Arminius began an uprising against the Romans in AD 9, Segimundus sided with the rebels after allegedly tearing his priestly garland from his head. In 15, after the Battle of the Teutoburg Forest, Segestes and Segimundus were besieged by Arminius. Segestes then sent Segimundus as part of a delegation to the Roman army leader Germanicus, in hope for support against Arminius. Segimundus was forgiven by Germanicus for his earlier participation in Arminius' rebellion. He was sent across the Rhine with an escort and was able to save Segestes from defeat. In 17, Segimundus, his sister Thusnelda, wife of Arminius, and her son Thumelicus were part of the triumph of Germanicus in Rome.

== Sources ==
- Arthur Stein: Segimundus. In: Paulys Realencyclopädie der classischen Altertumswissenschaft (RE). Band II A,1, Stuttgart 1921, Sp. 1073.
- Volker Losemann: Segimundus. In: Der Neue Pauly (DNP). Band 11, Metzler, Stuttgart 2001, ISBN 3-476-01481-9, Sp. 339 f.
- Hermann Reichert, Konrad Vössing: Segestes. In: Reallexikon der Germanischen Altertumskunde (RGA). 2. Auflage. Band 28, Walter de Gruyter, Berlin / New York 2005, ISBN 3-11-018207-6, S. 105–107.
