= Colony House =

Colony House may refer to:

== Historic structures in the United States ==
Alphabetical by state

- Colony House (Simi, California), listed on the National Register of Historic Places (NRHP) in Ventura County
- Colony House, in Madison, Maine, part of the NRHP-listed Lakewood Theater complex
- Colony House (Keene, New Hampshire), NRHP-listed in Cheshire County
- Old Colony House, Newport, Rhode Island, a National Historic Landmark and NRHP-listed

== Other uses ==
- Colony houses, a type of house built in Edinburgh, Scotland in the 19th century
- Colony House (band), an American alternative rock quartet
