= Ara Ubiorum =

The Ara Ubiorum (Altar of the Ubii) was a Roman sanctuary in the Oppidum Ubiorum (modern day Cologne). It was erected in the last decade of the 1st century BC and was dedicated to the goddess Roma and the Roman emperor. It was a central location for the Germans conquered by Augustus to demonstrate their loyalty to Rome and the Emperor through offerings. Like the Ara trium Galliarum, the altar was the site of the concilium provinciae ("provincial council") for the planned province of Germania Magna. The priests who serviced the altar were drawn from high-ranking Germans.

== History ==
Tacitus reports that in AD 9, the Cherusci prince Segimundus was serving at the altar. When he learnt of the defeat of Publius Quinctilius Varus in the Battle of the Teutoburg Forest, Segimundus is meant to have ripped the priestly headband from his head and fled over the Rhine to Germany in order to join the war effort.

After the abandonment of the territories on the right bank of the Rhine in AD 16, the sanctuary lost its regional significance. It continued to be maintained in Roman Cologne.

== Location ==
The Ara Ubiorum must have been located in a significant and highly visible spot, but we lose track of it in later Roman Cologne (Colonia Claudia Ara Agrippinensium). The Oppidum Ubiorum was located within the walls erected after the founding of the colonia, probably on the main street of the Roman city, which ran through the forum. This means that the altar probably was located in the area of Old St. Alban's and Gürzenich, which archaeological evidence also supports.

== Bibliography ==
- Werner Eck: Köln in römischer Zeit. Geschichte einer Stadt im Rahmen des Imperium Romanum. Köln 2004, ISBN 3-7743-0357-6, pp. 86ff.
- Rudolf Haensch: Das römische Köln als „Hauptstadt“ der Provinz Germania inferior. In: Geschichte in Köln 33, 1993. pp. 5–40.
