= William Stewart of Grandtully =

William Stewart of Grandtully (1567–1646) was a Scottish landowner and courtier.

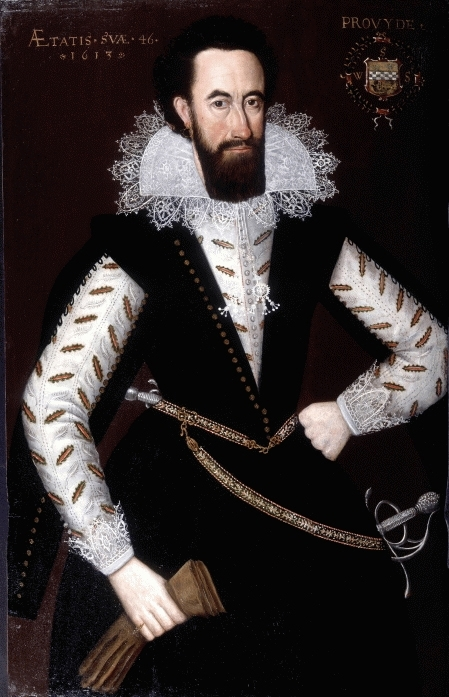
William Stewart of Grandtully, Adam de Colone

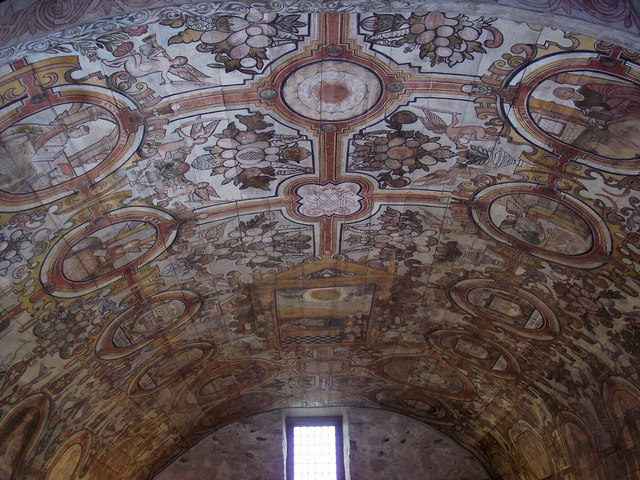
Painted wooden vault at Grandtully Chapel

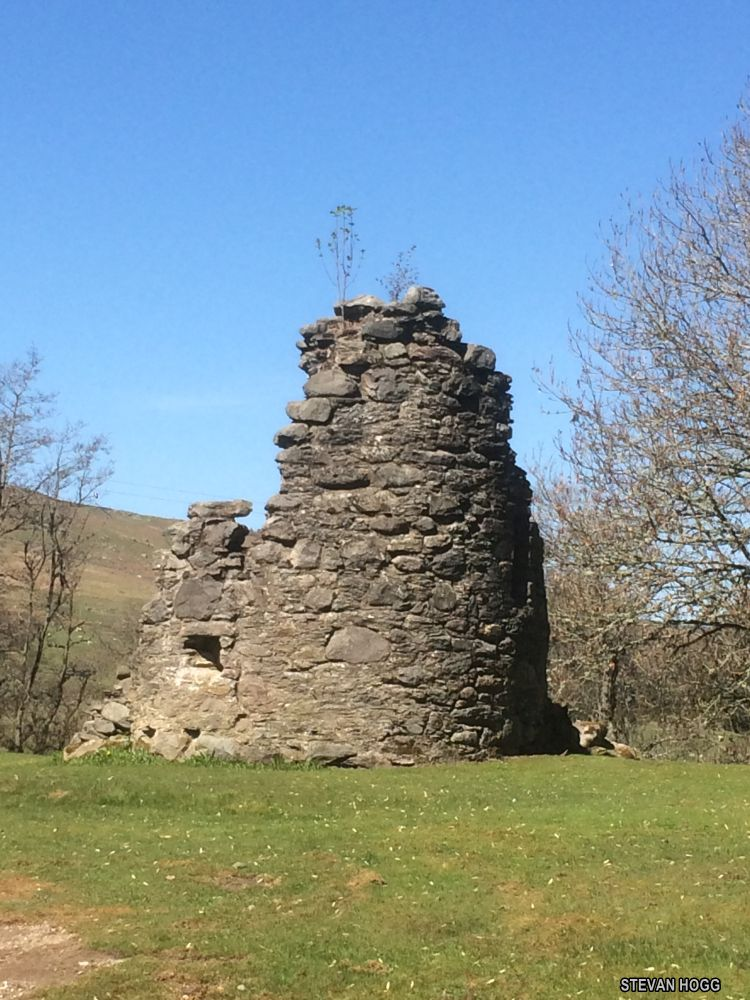
William Stewart was given the Ruthven castle of Trochry in Perthshire

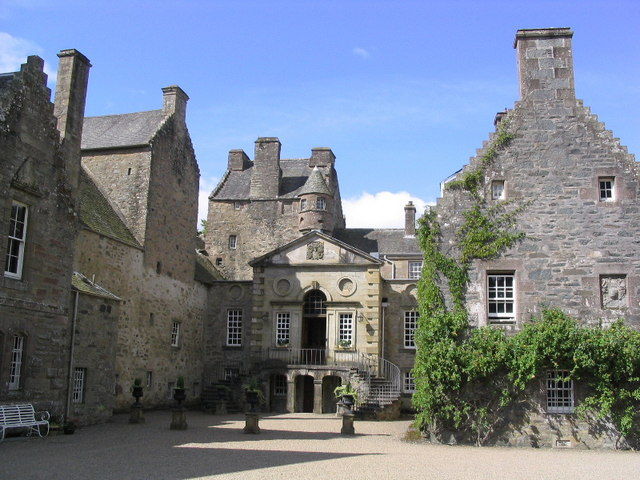
Murthly Castle

== Career ==
He was a son of William Stewart or Steuart of Grandtully (died 1574) and Isobella Stewart, a daughter of John Stewart, 3rd Earl of Atholl.

It is said that he was brought and educated with James VI at Stirling Castle. A royal charter of 1602 reflects this, noting that he was in the king's service "since his coronation". Stewart was described as a "page of honour" at court in 1585. A Latin charter of 1603 calls him William Stewart of Banchrie, the king's bedchamber servant.

The chronicle attributed to David Moysie says that this man (described as the Laird of Grandtully, nephew of the Earl of Atholl) and his kinship friends, declared to James VI in 1579 that John Stewart, 4th Earl of Atholl had been poisoned at a banquet at a Stirling Castle.

He had an older brother, Thomas Stewart, who became Laird of Grandtully. William became Laird of Banchrie. Before his death in 1611, Thomas feued the lands of Grandtully to William, who was then known as the "feuar of Grandtully".

William Stewart became a gentleman of the king's bedchamber in May 1594. He helped save the king from the Gowrie Conspiracy at Perth on 5 August 1600 and James VI rewarded him with the forfeited Ruthven castle of Trochrie near Little Dunkeld and the barony of Strathbran. A privy seal letter of November 1600 describes him as a "daily servitor" of the king. He is said to have made additions to Trochrie Castle which featured his initials and heraldry.

He does not seem to have resided at court in London after the Union of the Crowns.

His home was at Grandtully where he refurbished St Mary's church with a wooden vault painted with vignettes around the year 1636. He also came to own Murthly Castle.

His portrait was painted by Adam de Colone and a copy of this picture still hangs at Murthly.

He died in 1646 and was buried at Grandtully.

== Marriage and children ==
He married Agnes Moncreiff. Her monogram and heraldry appears in the chapel at Grandtully. Their children included:

- Thomas Stewart of Grandtully (1608-1688), who married Grizel Menzies. Their daughter Grissel Stuart married John Drummond of Logiealmond.
- Henry Stewart
- William Stewart

== Other contemporaries called William Stewart ==
It is not clear if this William Stewart was same man as the valet of James VI who accompanied him to Denmark in 1589 and acted as his pursemaster, whose career is described here: William Stewart (courtier).

There were several men called William Stewart active at Scottish court in this period, including:

- William Stewart of Houston, a soldier and diplomat, known as Colonel Stewart, who also attended James VI in Denmark.
- William Stewart, of Dundee, skipper, captain of one of the ships of James VI in Denmark, and the "Bruce" of George Bruce of Carnock.
- William Stewart of Monkton (d. 1588), Provost of Ayr.
- William Stewart of Caverston, and subsequently Laird of Traquair, Captain of Dumbarton Castle.
- William Stewart, a retainer of the Duke of Lennox, participant in the Raid of Holyrood in December 1591.
- William Stewart, a servant of Regent Morton mentioned in Morton's "Confession".
