= Jim Colony =

American Radio Sportscaster

Jim Colony is an American radio sportscaster who is now mostly retired, outside of occasional fill-in shifts at Pittsburgh station KDKA-FM, a.k.a. 93.7 The Fan. From 2010-2022 he served as co-host/update anchor on The Fan Morning Show with a variety of other hosts, including Gregg Giannotti, Paul Alexander, Jon Burton, Josh Miller, Colin Dunlap and Chris Mack. Colony provided sports updates three times an hour from 6 a.m. to noon on The Fan and twice an hour on KDKA-AM Morning News. He reported on the Steelers, Penguins, Pirates and Pitt football and basketball. He was born in Boston, raised in Keene, New Hampshire, and graduated from the University of New Hampshire.

Jim currently serves as a weekend starter at Pheasant Ridge Golf Club.

== Background ==
From 2000-2009, Colony worked at now-defunct ESPN Radio 1250 in Pittsburgh as a drive-time sports anchor. Colony also worked at 1250 from 1991-97 when it was WTAE, flagship for the Steelers and Pitt football and basketball and before that, at KISS 108 in Boston, WORD in Spartanburg, South Carolina, WKBR in Manchester, New Hampshire, and WCFR in Springfield, Vermont. Jim has a wife (Linda) and two sons (Chris and Pat) and currently resides in Richland, a suburb of Pittsburgh.

== Deep Background ==
When he returned to Pittsburgh in 2000 Colony frequently drew the ire of 1250 talk show host Mark Madden. He was the focus of a "benchmark segment" which aired around 5:40pm Monday through Friday on the Mark Madden show, entitled "Mr. Colony, Super Jackass," a take off of the original segment "Mr. Madden, Super Genius." For several months at a time this segment took on the form of the game show "Who Wants to Win 15 Bucks" where callers have to answer 3 questions from a variety of categories in order to win the money. During this game show phase, in which he was referred to as "Colonelberg", "Wink" and most recently "Dutch", Colony was responsible for coming up with the majority (read all) of the categories and questions for each show. The segment currently features Madden and Colony discussing sports and entertainment related topics, with Colony acting curt, a departure from his normal demeanor. "Who Wants to Win 15 Bucks" is now on hiatus. Mark Madden enjoys referring to Colony's wife, Linda, as Lorraine and his kids as Petey and Jim Jr.
