= Colonie =

Colonie may refer to:

- Colonie (town), New York
- Colonie (village), New York
- La Colonie, an 18th-century French comedy play
