= Grandtully =

Coordinates: 56.656998°N 3.776385°W

Grandtully: Scottish Gaelic: Gar an Tulaich; Scots: Grantully
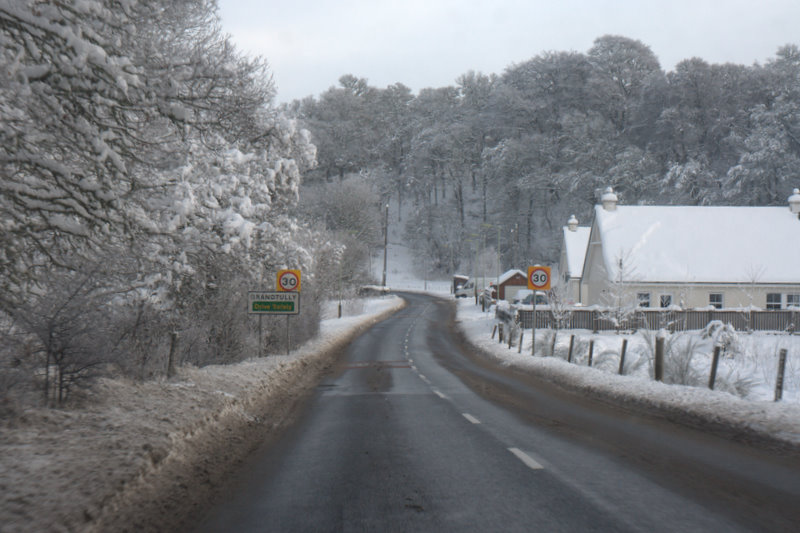
- Grandtully in winter

- Location within Perth and Kinross
- OS grid reference: NN912531
- Council area: Perth and Kinross
- Country: Scotland
- Sovereign state: United Kingdom
- Post town: PITLOCHRY
- Postcode district: PH9xx
- Dialling code: 01887
- Police: Scotland
- Fire: Scottish
- Ambulance: Scottish
- UK Parliament: Angus and Perthshire Glens
- Scottish Parliament: Perthshire North

Grandtully (pronounced as "Grantly" and sometimes also spelt "Grantully") is a small village in Perthshire, Scotland.

It is situated close to the River Tay, about 3 miles (5 kilometres) from Pitlochry. It has a population of approximately 750 inhabitants.

== Parish Church ==
Grandtully has a Church of Scotland parish church; it is now part of Grantully, Logierait and Strathtay Parish (within the Church of Scotland's Presbytery of Dunkeld and Meigle).

== St Mary's church ==
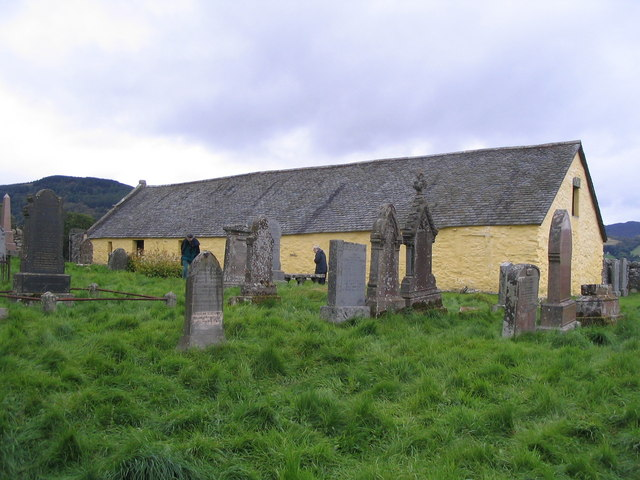
St Mary's Church and graveyard at Grandtully

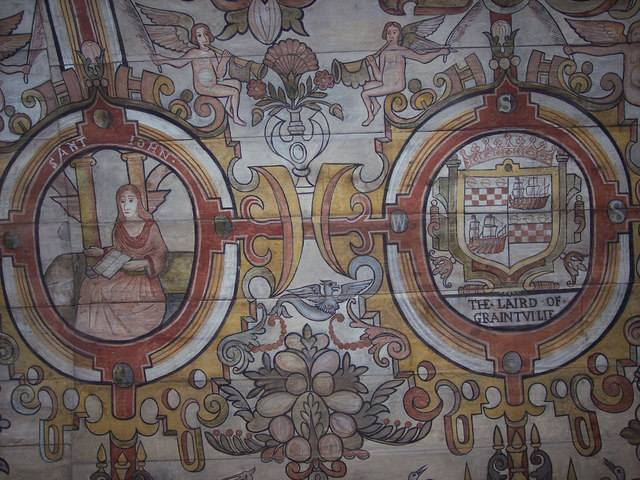
St Mary's Chapel, Grandtully - Painted Ceiling

In Nether Pitcairn, 3.2 km south-west of Grandtully, there is a church built by Alexander Stewart of Grandtully in, or shortly before, 1533.

It is a low and outwardly unassuming white washed building that contains a wooden barrel vault ceiling with tempera paintings from the early 17th century commissioned by William Stewart around 1636. At the centre, a painted aedicule frames a death-bed and resurrection scene. The ceiling includes scenes and persons from the bible intermixed with the coats of arms of kings and noblemen, and in addition an abundance of birds, fruits and angels, all depicted in a renaissance style with cartouches and imitated metal work. The paintings were restored in about 1950.

== Grandtully Castle ==
Dating to 1560, although an earlier castle stood around 1 mile (1.5 kilometres) east and dates from 1414; only its foundations remain.

== Notable people ==
- The Drummond-Stewart baronets
- William Stewart of Grandtully, landowner and courtier.
- Sir William Drummond Stewart of Grandtully Castle, and his son,
- George Stewart, recipient of the Victoria Cross

== See also ==
- Ballechin House – a now-demolished supposedly haunted house
- Grandtully rapids
