= Colony (restaurant) =

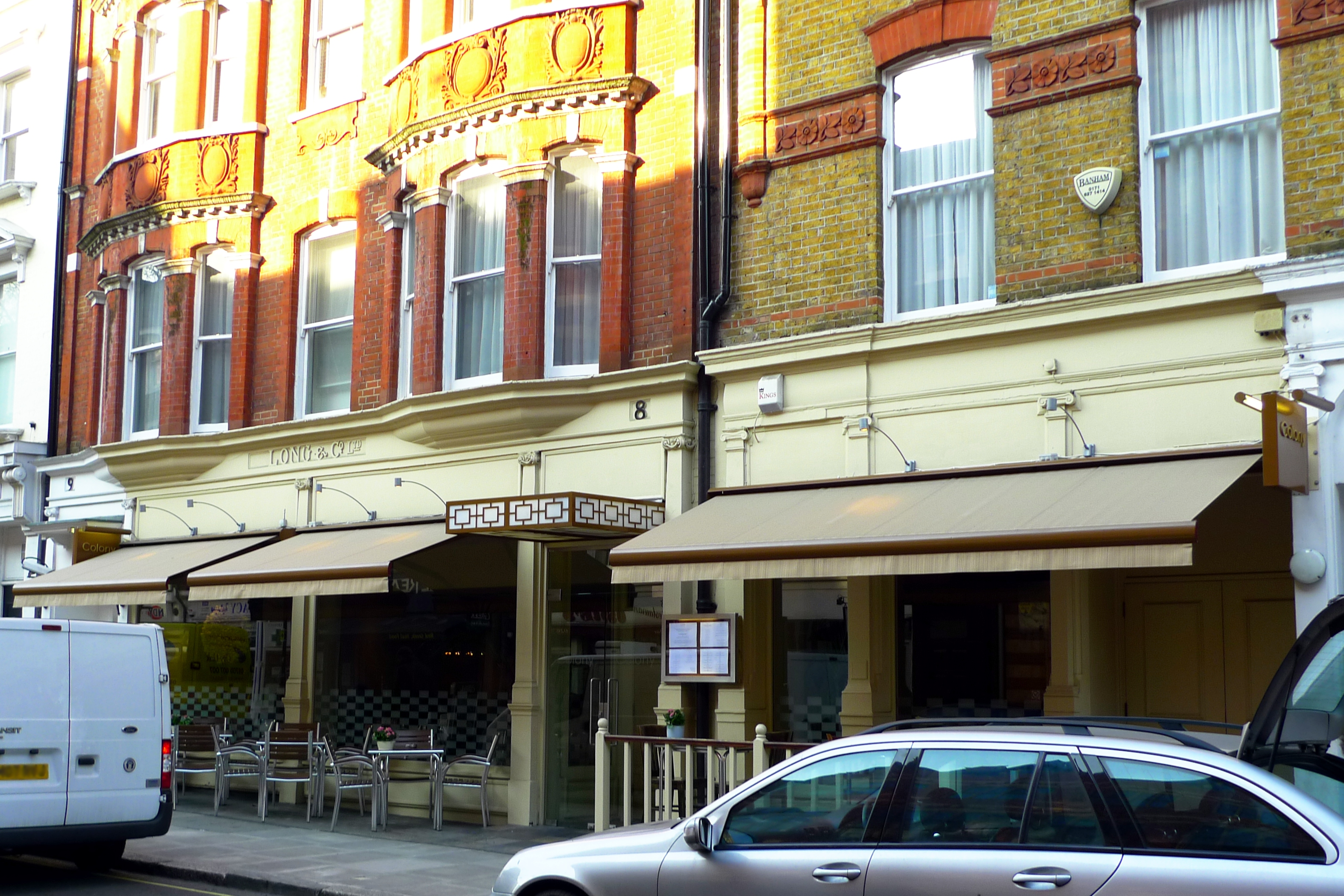

- Location in Central London

Restaurant information
- Established: 2010
- Owners: Carlo Spetale; John Lacombe (manager)
- Food type: Asian cuisine
- Location: London, United Kingdom
- Coordinates: 51°31′15″N 0°9′13″W
- Website: ColonyBarAndGrill.com

Colony, or Colony Bar and Grill is a restaurant, bar and grill located at 7–9 Paddington Street, Marylebone, Central London, England. It opened in early April 2010 and was run by restaurateur Carlo Spetale and the Michelin-starred executive chef Atul Kochhar.

Kocchar announced he was leaving the business in June 2011 to focus on other interests. The split was described as amicable.

The cuisine of the restaurant is inspired by that of the British colonies from colonial Asia, East Africa, the Caribbean etc. but is mainly inspired by Indian street food, specifically "the marinades, aromatic flavours and grilling methods" of the street traders of colonial Asia. The General Manager of the restaurant is John Lacombe, formerly of The Connaught Hotel, 5th Floor Restaurant at Harvey Nichols and Notting Hill Brasserie amongst others. Lacombe is also responsible for the winery of the restaurant. It has a reputable cocktail lounge.

== Reception ==
The restaurant has received mixed reviews. Zoe Williams of The Daily Telegraph was highly praising and described the restaurant as "I think this is what heaven will look like – complete with a barman making you feel it would be almost rude not to have a martini. " Williams was content with her meal and remarked that the "pancakes were made of chickpea flour (the chickpeas' main contribution was a lovely, rich density, with only the whiff of their flavour), packed with spinach, in a tomato and cream sauce".

Tracey MacLeod of The Independent was critical about the menu, saying:

Colony, in slightly less leafy Marylebone, calls itself a bar and grill, but the menu is far less casual than this implies. Rather than serving a selection of patties, puris and grilled meats, or going down the Anglo-Indian route pioneered by Chutney Mary, the restaurant offers complex, recondite dishes which would have the memsahibs calling for the smelling salts. Roasted mallard marinated in lindi peppers and stone moss? Lamb meat loaf infused with rose petals? Veal vindaloo with coriander chips? Whatever this is, it certainly isn't street food.

She said about the food, "Even though many of the dishes we tried were very good, they weren't quite good enough to earn Colony a rave review", and remarked that the chicken tikka masala was "authentically inauthentic, in its creamy sweetness and brick-red colour." Both MacLeod and Hugo Rifkind of The Times were unconvinced with the authenticity of the cuisine, mentioning that is more a fusion of Eastern and Western cuisines rather than truly Asian.

Matthew Norman of The Guardian was strongly negative of the restaurant, giving it a scathing review and a score of 0.05/10.

== Notable diners ==
The restaurant is said to be a favourite of Simon Cowell. In 2010, Liam Gallagher stormed out of the restaurant after the staff refused to make him a bacon butty.
