= Colonia (Madeira) =

Colonia was a land exploitation regime specific to Madeira Island, in which the landlord gave the land to a colono (settler) to clear and cultivate, receiving part of the production (usually half), and being able to evict the settler at any time, but having to compensate him for the value of the improvements he had made. The colonia was abolished at the end of the 20th century, following the Regional Decree 13/77/M, approved in 1977.

== History ==
The colonia most probably emerged in the 17th century, when sugar cane was replaced by vineyards as the island's main crop, and was used as a means of carrying out the work of reconverting the land without great cost to the owner, having become predominant in the 18th century.

After the Liberal Revolution, the colonia regime did not really fit into the law, as it didn't fully fit either the partnership or the emphyteusis; in 1854 and 1867, laws on the colonia regime were approved by the parliament, but they were not implemented in the end.; also in 1867 a Civil Code was approved that ignored the regime, which led courts to frequently refuse to judge cases involving colonia contracts. On the other hand, as of 1885 the tax authorities started to consider the improvements as property of the settler, who would have to pay taxes on them (although the principle that the improvements should be considered property of the settler was already established on the island long before that).

The colonia system has always been characterized by some conflict between settlers and landowners, and since the 18th century there were movements towards its abolition, which, on the island of Porto Santo, occurred as early as 1770 (even before that, Porto Santo already had a more favorable regime for the settlers, who since 1722 had the right to 2/3 of the production, instead of only half); and in 1776 there were claims by the settlers of Madeira Island in the sense that they were also entitled to 2/3 of the production, and there was even a rebellion in 1818. Another example of this social tension occurred in 1927, when a protest of settlers and tenants in the Lombada area of Ponta do Sol led the government to expropriate two large properties in the area to resell them to settlers on favorable terms.

In the years before the Carnation Revolution, the development of tourism would also have its influence, as the real estate reconversion of previously agricultural land led to a series of large-scale evictions with great social impact.

In 1967, Decree-Law 47 937 of September 15 abolished the figure of the colonia, but keeping valid the contracts prior to that date; the new Portuguese Constitution of 1976 defined that the colonia regime should be extinguished, and the Regional Decrees 13/77/M, 16/79 and 7/80/M abolished the system, converting it into a lease contract, but giving the settlers the right to acquire, if they so wished, full ownership of the land.

== Characteristics and consequences ==
Formally, the colonia system was based on the principle that the landowner delivered a piece of land to be cleared to a settler (although the clearing obligation became fictitious, since from a certain point onwards almost all the usable land was already being cultivated), and from that point on, possession was divided between the land (landlord's property) and the improvements (settler's property); the production was normally divided half to the landlord (sometimes 2/3, when the landlord had already made improvements) and half to the settler, at least in what concerns the so-called "rich crops" (wine, banana, sugar cane), with greater commercial value (in these cases, the settler often delivered the production to the landlord who proceeded with its commercialization, only later delivering to the settler the value corresponding to his half). This led the landlords to demand that the settlers cultivate mainly these products.

The separation of ownership of land from improvements had several consequences - notably it contributed to greater fragmentation of ownership, as it allowed laws forbidding excessive subdivision of land in inheritances to be overcome (since legally all the land itself belonged to the same owner and what the settler's heirs were subdividing were the improvements, even if these were fictitious); before the abolition of the majorat (which prevented the sale of land, and consequently its mortgage), also allowed owners to borrow by the ruse of becoming settlers themselves, and thus giving the improvements as a mortgage. Settlers also had an incentive to build as many improvements as possible, to increase the amount the landlord would have to pay them in case of eviction, often leading to works (such as walls or terraces) sometimes of dubious usefulness; For their part, the landlords tried to limit the improvements that the settlers built, sometimes leading to prohibitions on the cultivation of fruit trees and above all to major limitations on the construction of dwellings (which often had to be made of perishable materials and in areas - such as rocks - that would not take up area for crops).
