= Colony, Lexington =

Colony
- Neighborhood of Lexington, Kentucky
- Interactive map of Colony
- Coordinates: 38.042°N 84.563°W
- Country: United States
- State: Kentucky
- County: Fayette
- City: Lexington

Area
  - Total: 0.153 sq mi (0.40 km^{2})
  - Water: 0 sq mi (0.0 km^{2})

Population (2000)
  - Total: 306
  - Density: 1,999/sq mi (772/km^{2})
- Time zone: UTC-5 (Eastern (EST))
  - Summer (DST): UTC-4 (EDT)
- ZIP code: 40504
- Area code: 859

Colony is a neighborhood in southwestern Lexington, Kentucky, United States. Its boundaries are Parkers Mill Road to the south and east, Versailles Road to the north, and New Circle Road to the west.

== Neighborhood statistics ==
- Area: 0.153 square miles (0.40 km^{2})
- Population: 306
- Population density: 1,999 people per square mile
- Median household income (2010): $72,162
