= Isaac Colonia =

Dutch painter

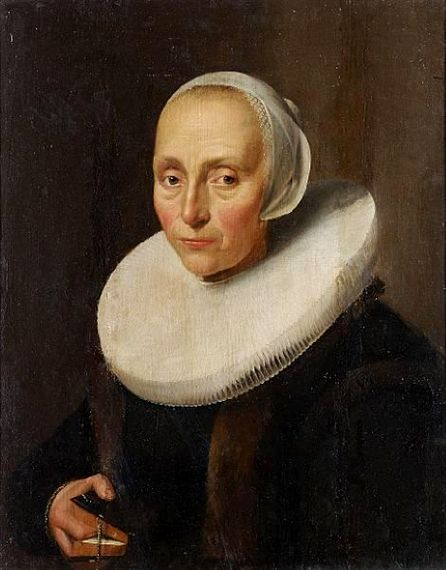
Portrait of a Lady

Isaac Colonia (1611 in Rotterdam – 27 March 1663 in Rotterdam), was a Dutch Golden Age painter of portraits, still lifes, and landscapes.

== Biography ==
According to the Netherlands Institute for Art History he was the son of Adam Louisz Colonia and Baetris Dircksdr. van Beyeren, and the father of Adam Colonia. He lived on the Delfschevaart in Rotterdam, and is known for portraits. Little work survives, as he appears to have run a business as art dealer. In the inventory taken after his death, 80 large and small paintings were recorded. The benefactors of his estate were (besides his widow) mostly painters: Adriaen van de Venne, Jacques Bellevois, Adam Colonia, Cornelis Schaeck, Jacob Verboom, Jacob Peye and Abraham Hondius. Between 1634 and 1655 he and his wife had 9 children. Three were still minors when he died, and they were assigned to the care of his son Adam.
