= Horatio Colony =

American poet, playwright and businessman (1900–1977)

Horatio Colony II
- Born: September 22, 1900; Keene, New Hampshire, US
- Died: April 28, 1977 (aged 76); Keene, New Hampshire
- Education: Harvard College; Phillips Exeter Academy
- Occupations: Poet, playwright, novelist

Horatio Colony II (September 22, 1900 – April 28, 1977) was an American poet, novelist, playwright, and businessman from Keene, New Hampshire. He wrote a 1935 novel entitled Free Forester, as well as twelve volumes of poetry and two plays.

== Life and career ==
Colony was born in 1900 in Keene, New Hampshire, and was the grandson of the city's first mayor, Horatio Colony Sr. His family were successful mill owners, a vocation that he inherited but for which he had little passion. He owned shares in the Faulkner & Colony Woolen Mill and Cheshire Mills, both in or near Keene. He attended Keene High School and graduated from Phillips Exeter Academy in 1918 and Harvard College in 1922. He began writing at an early age and continued to do so until his death.

Spending much of his life as a bachelor, Colony traveled the world, visiting European countries (his favorite destinations were Italy and Greece) as well as Egypt, and he collected decorative arts and antiques from various cultures. In 1946, he married Mary Curtis (1907–1969) of Concord, Massachusetts. The couple had no children. In his posthumously published memoirs, Colony wrote that "my embarrassment regarding women ... was due to homosexuality, as I have always been impressed by the appearance of men. I have had recrudescences of periods that have come and gone with me through life, during which I am physically attracted to men."

Colony corresponded with the poet Witter Bynner. Both writers were known for their homoerotic writings. While visiting Bynner's home in Santa Fe in 1935, the poet Robert Frost criticized Colony's poetry as "bestial," referring to the "thinly veiled celebrations of homosexuality" present in his work. Bynner responded to the criticism by dumping a glass of beer over Frost's head.

== Writings ==
Colony wrote a historical novel, Free Forester (1935), as well as twelve books of poetry and two plays. Free Forester was the most successful of his works, receiving a positive review from The New York Times, which called him "a new name in literary circles" and the novel "sensitively and intelligently made and felt." A review in the Saturday Review similarly praised the novel, calling it an "extraordinary book" that succeeded in "recreating the all but lost American frontier of the day of Boone and Crockett."

Colony's poetic works include A Brook of Leaves (1935), Birth and Burials (1939), Bacchus and Krishna (1952), Demon in Love (1955), Young Malatesta (1957), Three Loves the Same (1961), The Early Land (1962), The Flying Ones (1964), Some Phoenix Blood (1969), Magic Child (1966), Flower Myth (1971), and Antique Thorn: The Faun's Girl (1974). He also wrote the plays The Amazon's Hero (1972) and The Emperor and the Bee Boy (1976). Many of his writings are classically themed, which reflect his literary tastes. He also kept a diary for much of his life; the manuscript is preserved at the Syracuse University Library.

== Legacy ==
After his death in 1977, Colony's home in Keene was turned into the Horatio Colony House Museum as per his will. Built in 1806 in the Federal style, the museum houses his collections and hosts various public programs. A 645-acre plot of land owned by his family was preserved as the Horatio Colony Nature Preserve at this time as well. The preserve holds Colony's cabin, which he built in 1938 to write in solitude. The preserve is open year-round to hikers. Both properties are managed by the Colony Memorial Trust.
