= Adam Colonia =

Dutch painter

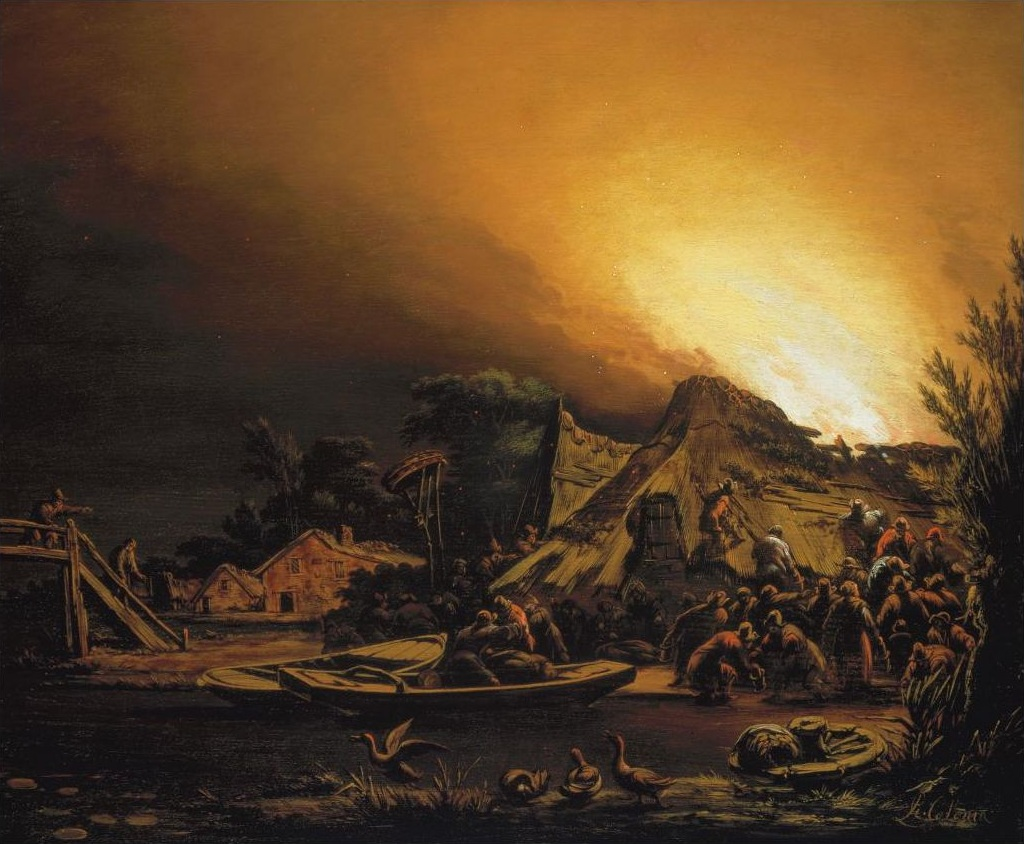
Village fire by night, ca. 1660, by Colonia after Egbert van der Poel

Adam Colonia (12 August 1634 – September 1685) was a Dutch Golden Age painter active in London.

== Biography ==
Colonia was born in Rotterdam. According to the RKD he was the son of Isaac Colonia, though coming from a painting family and running an art dealership in Rotterdam, may not have been his primary teacher. His work was influenced by Jan Daemen Cool and Egbert van der Poel, either of whom may have been his teacher. He married in Rotterdam in 1661 and travelled to London in 1670, where he stayed until his death. He is known for Italianate landscapes and religious works.

He sometimes painted landscapes and figures in the manner of Berchem. In the Copenhagen Museum there is a picture by him of 'Noah building the Ark'; and the Lille Museum has 'The Angel appearing to the Shepherds' attributed to him.
