= Kolonjë (placename) =

Kolonjë is an Albanian placename referring to the present or former presence of Romance language speakers. It derives from the Latin colonia and is related to the Roman period of the area.

Entities with this name include:

- Kolonjë, a municipality and former district in Korçë County, southeastern Albania
- Kolonjë, Gjirokastër, a village in Gjirokastër County, southern Albania
- Kolonjë, Fier, a town and former municipality in Fier County, western Albania
