= Colonia Claudia Ara Agrippinensium =

Roman colony from which the German city of Cologne developed

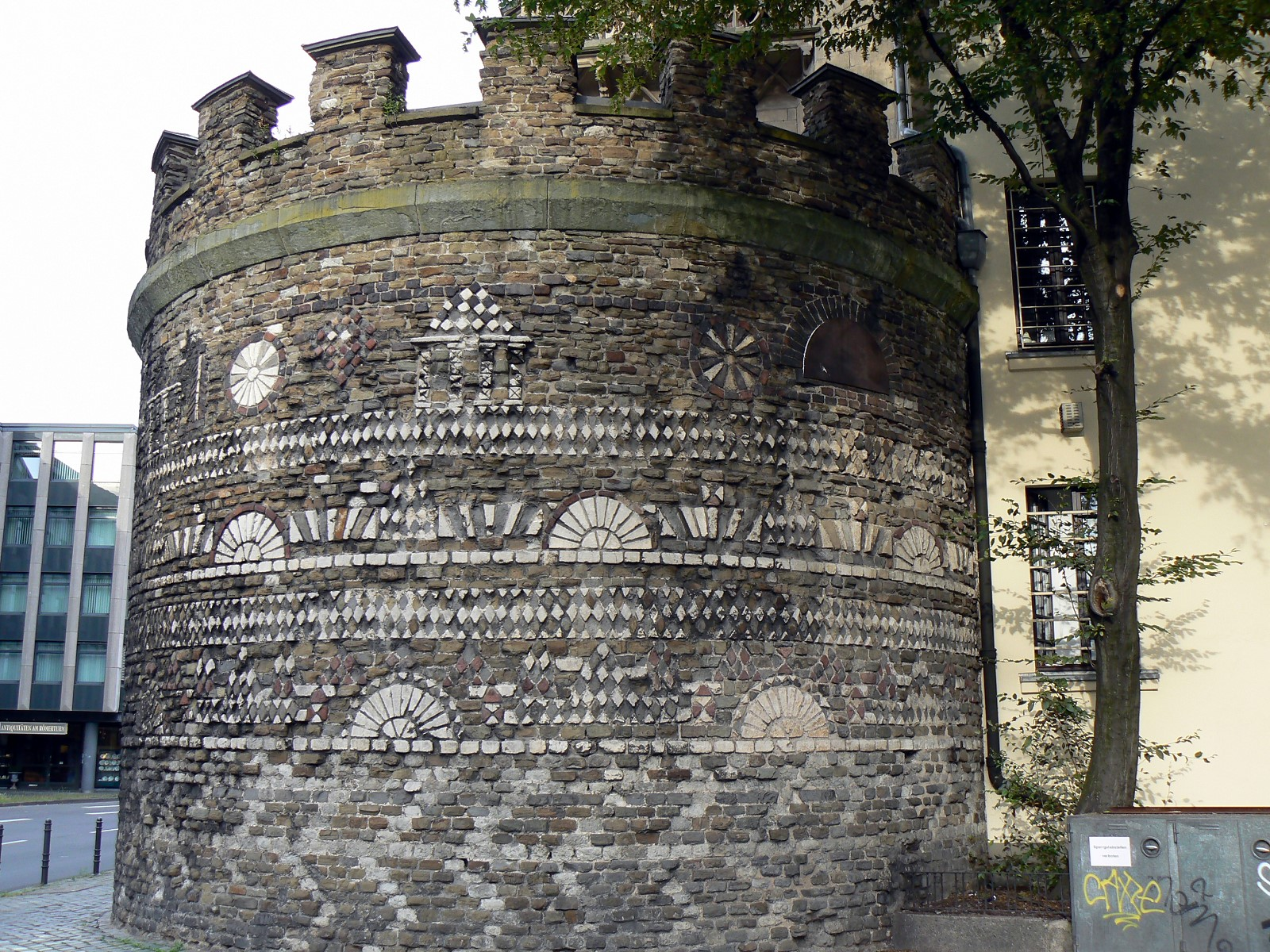
- Tower 13, so-called "Roman tower" northwest corner of the CCAA

- Location within Germany
- 50.938056°N 6.956944°E
- Location: Germany
- Region: North Rhine-Westphalia

UNESCO World Heritage Site
- Part of: Frontiers of the Roman Empire – The Lower German Limes
- Criteria: Cultural: ii, iii, iv
- Reference: 1631-076
- Inscription: 2021 (44th Session)

Colonia Claudia Ara Agrippinensium was the Roman colony in the Rhineland from which the city of Cologne, now in Germany, developed.

It was usually called Colonia (colony) and was the capital of the Roman province of Germania Inferior and the headquarters of the military in the region. With administrative reforms under Diocletian it became the capital of Germania Secunda. During the second and mid-third centuries, around 20,000 people lived in the city. Many artefacts from the ancient city survive, including the arch of the former city gate with the inscription "CCAA", which is today housed in the Romano-Germanic Museum.

== Historical background ==
=== Oppidum Ubiorum (Latin city of Ubii), Ara Ubiorum and Apud Aram Ubiorum ===
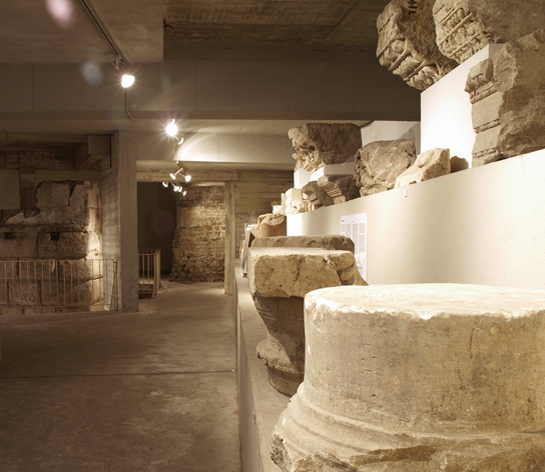
Ubiermonument (c. AD 4) in the Archaeological Zone

A Germanic tribe known as the Eburones had originally inhabited the present-day Cologne Lowland. But they were wiped out in a war of reprisal carried out by Julius Caesar. In 38 BC, the Germanic tribe known as the Ubii, who inhabited the right bank of the Rhine, were resettled by the Roman General Marcus Vipsanius Agrippa in the lands in the Cologne Lowland vacated by the Eburones. This brought the Ubii within Roman-occupied territory.

The Ubii chose an island in the Rhine as the central location of their settlement area. The island was a natural rise that was protected from flooding. The location of the settlement no longer exists today but it roughly comprises the area between the areas of the Heumarkt and the Alter Markt sections of the old city of Cologne. The settlement can be dated by archeological finds to the first half of the 1st century AD. By this time the typical Roman grid-style street plan was already in use. The settlement's assumed name is probably Oppidum Ubiorum (Settlement of the Ubii). The Roman epoch of the history of the city of Cologne begins with this oppidum.

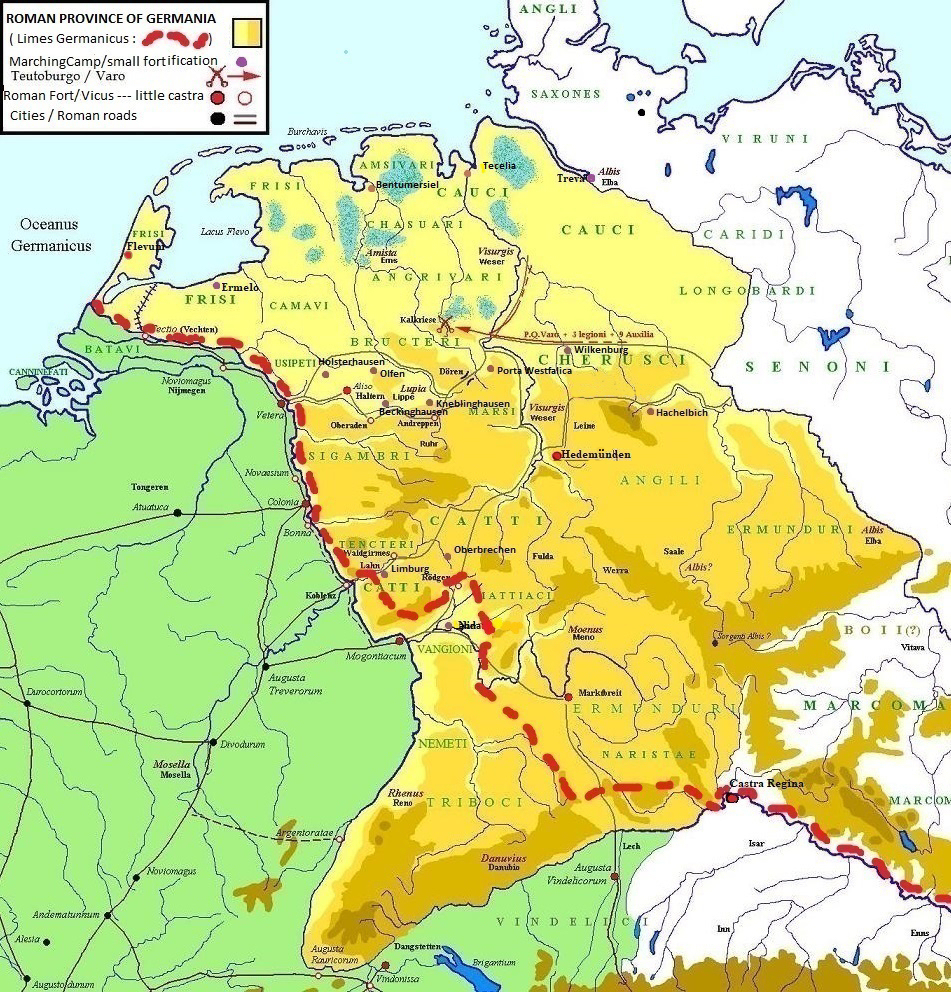
Map of the Roman province of Germania under Augustus, showing Colonia

During the rule of Augustus (30 BC to AD 14), the Ara Ubiorum (Altar of the Ubii) was constructed within the city limits. This altar was possibly foreseen as the central place of worship for a greater Germanic province, which would comprise lands across the Rhine, which remained unconquered at this point. The noble Segimundus is mentioned as the priest of the Ara in the year AD 9. He was from the family of Arminius, leader of the Cherusci. After Arminius' victory over Publius Quinctilius Varus in the same year at the Battle of the Teutoburg Forest, the plans for a greater German province were largely set aside. However, the altar itself retained some of its importance as the city is mentioned as “Ara Ubiorum” in many inscriptions.

Between 9 and AD 30 the area of present-day Cologne was mainly a garrison. Legio I Germanica and the Legio XX Valeria Victrix were stationed nearby. The place of the initial Roman Castra was known as Apud Aram Ubiorum (At the Altar of the Ubii).

The headquarters of Germanicus were located in Cologne from AD 13 to 17, when he was recalled by Tiberius. After the Battle of the Teutoburg Forest, Germanicus made efforts to stabilize the border region and to plan and carry out new offensives against the Germanic tribes located on the right bank of the Rhine. With the death of Augustus in AD 14 the legions garrisoned in Cologne mutinied with the aim of establishing Germanicus as emperor. These legions probably united in mutiny with those from Vetera stationed at their summer garrison in Castrum Novasium. Germanicus however remained loyal to Tiberius, who was heir to the throne. He dissuaded the legions from declaring him emperor and at the same time placated the mutineers through generous concessions.

Legio I was later stationed in Bonna (present-day Bonn) and Legio XX garrisoned Castrum Novaesium near present-day Neuss.

=== Promotion to Roman colony ===
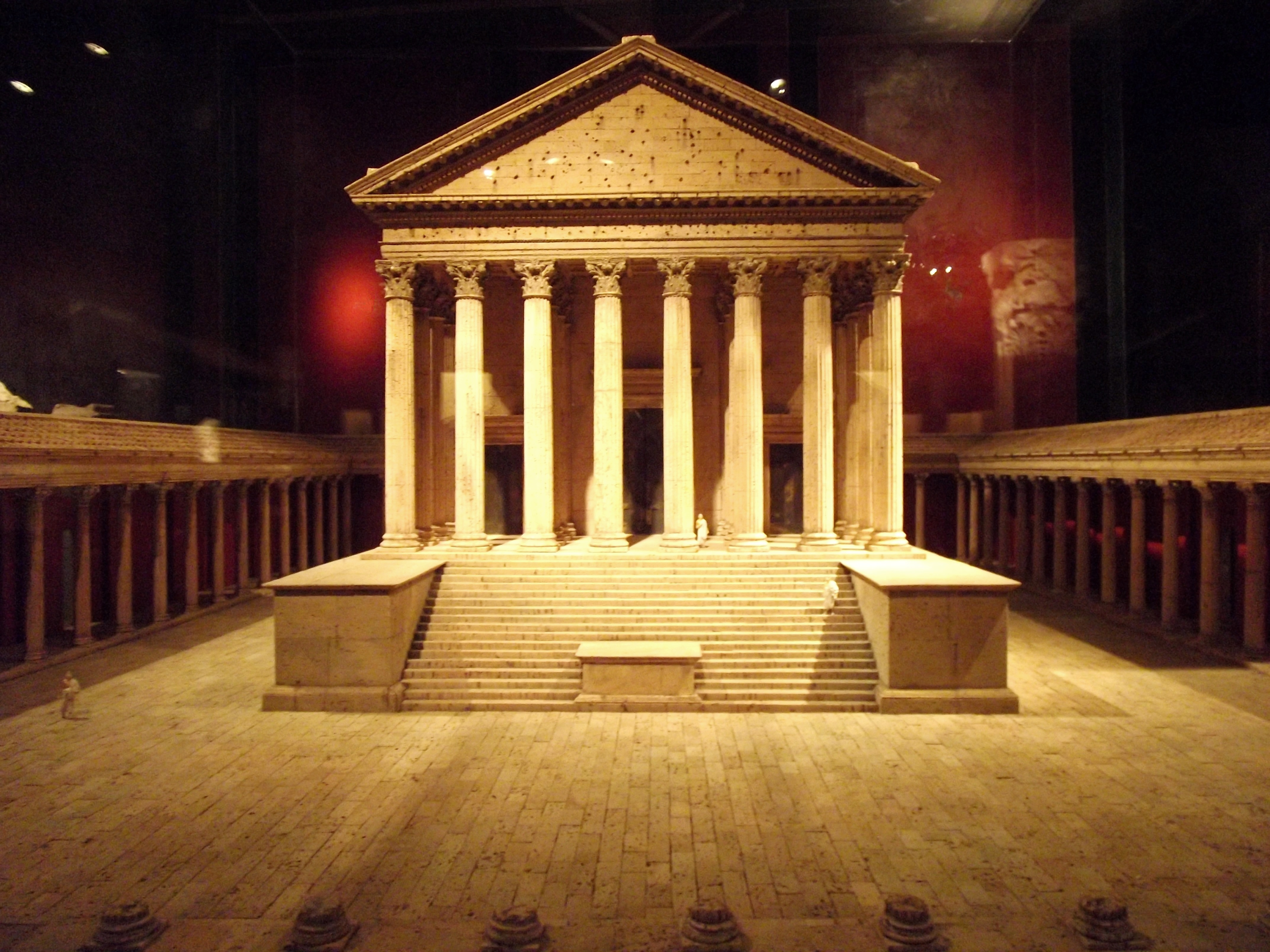
Reconstructed model of the Capitoline Temple (early 2nd century AD), today site of the church St. Maria im Kapitol

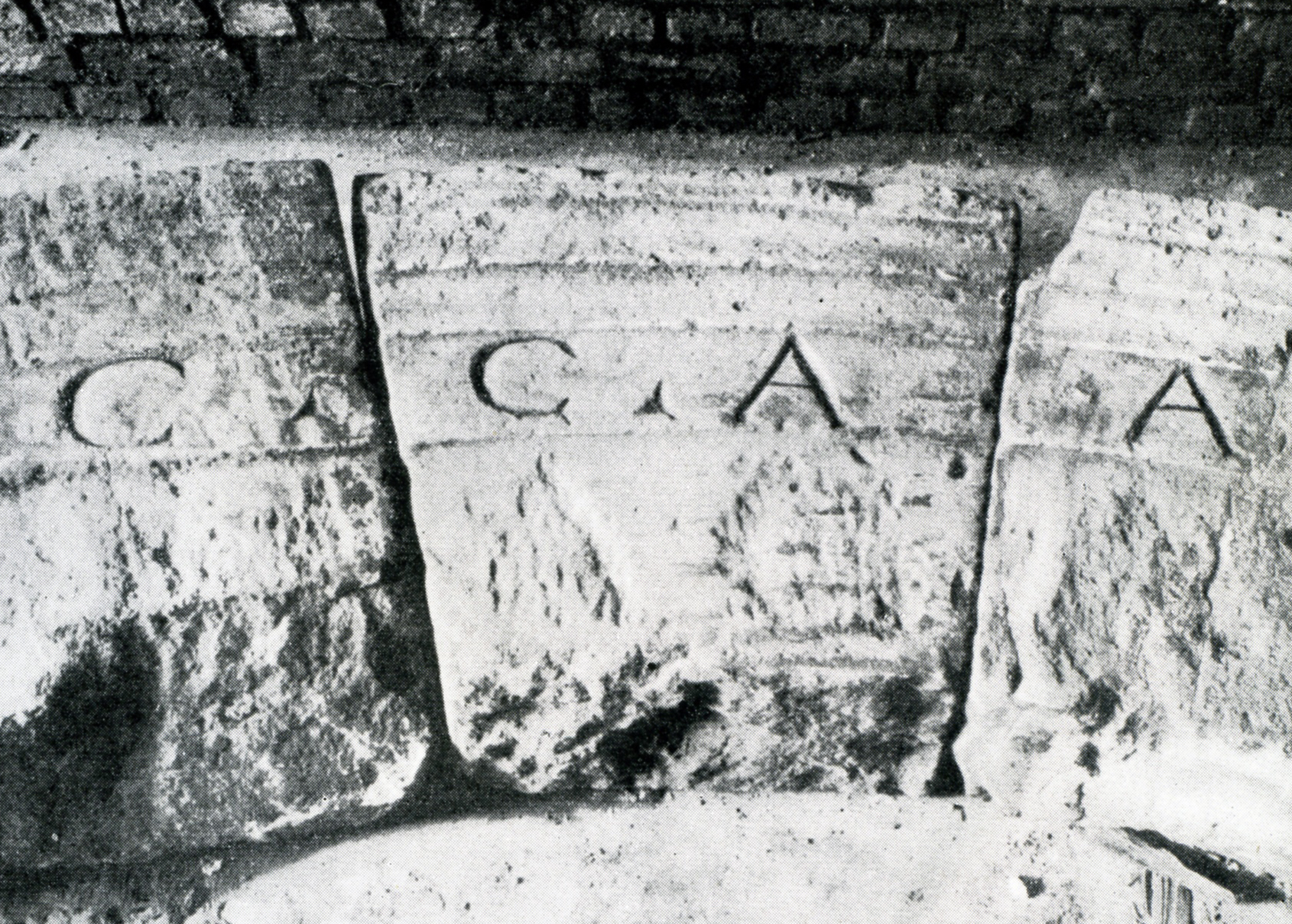
CCAA inscription above the north gate next to the cathedral

Agrippina the younger was born in AD 15 in Cologne. She was the daughter of Germanicus and the wife of the Roman Emperor Claudius. She succeeded in convincing Claudius around 50 AD to elevate her birthplace to a colonia named Colonia Claudia Ara Agrippinensium (Colony of Claudius and Altar of the Agrippinians) − where the name of the emperor stands for the rights granted to a colonia, that of the empress for the inhabitants, her compatriots, who she had named Agrippinenses after her, and even the altar at the central sanctuary (on the forum) was mentioned, the Ara Ubiorum, where, in addition to the emperor, the Ubiian gods were worshiped. The elevation gave the previous oppidum the status of "city" under Roman law and a Roman colony had many more imperial rights than an oppidum. At this time the city became the administrative capital of Germania Inferior. Before this time the area was not an official province, but an occupied area controlled and administered initially by the military (exercitus Germaniae inferioris) and later temporarily defined as a tentative "Germania provincia".

From AD 70 on the city had a strong city wall that was c. 8 meters in height and 2.5 meters wide. However, the remains of the Roman city wall that can still be seen today are from the 3rd century AD. The unwalled portions of the city were equal to a square kilometer. Its most important steles and grave goods are preserved in the Romano-Germanic Museum.

=== The year of four emperors and Batavian revolt ===
In AD 68, the death of Emperor Nero caused a succession crisis in Rome. This led to a civil war throughout the empire. The Roman Senate installed Servius Sulpicius Galba as emperor, but he was quickly murdered by another contender for the throne, Marcus Salvius Otho, who had the backing of the Praetorian Guard. Meanwhile, the legions stationed in Colonia called for their commander Aulus Vitellius to be crowned as emperor. Vitellius marched on Italy at the head of the better part of the Rhine legions, and defeated Otho's troops at the First Battle of Bedriacum, in which Otho himself was killed.

A power vacuum occurred on the now undefended Rhine border. The Batavians rose and advanced on the empire from the Northeast of Germania Inferior. The majority of the inhabitants of Colonia remained Ubii, as they had not been fully romanised. They quickly sided with the Batavians. However, when the Batavians demanded that the city wall be torn down, the inhabitants of Colonia again sided with the Roman Empire.

Vitellius was overthrown eight months later by Titus Flavius Vespasianus, whose troops feared reprisals for having previously recognized Otho as emperor. Vitellius was killed and his body thrown into the Tiber.

=== Capital of the province Germania Inferior ===
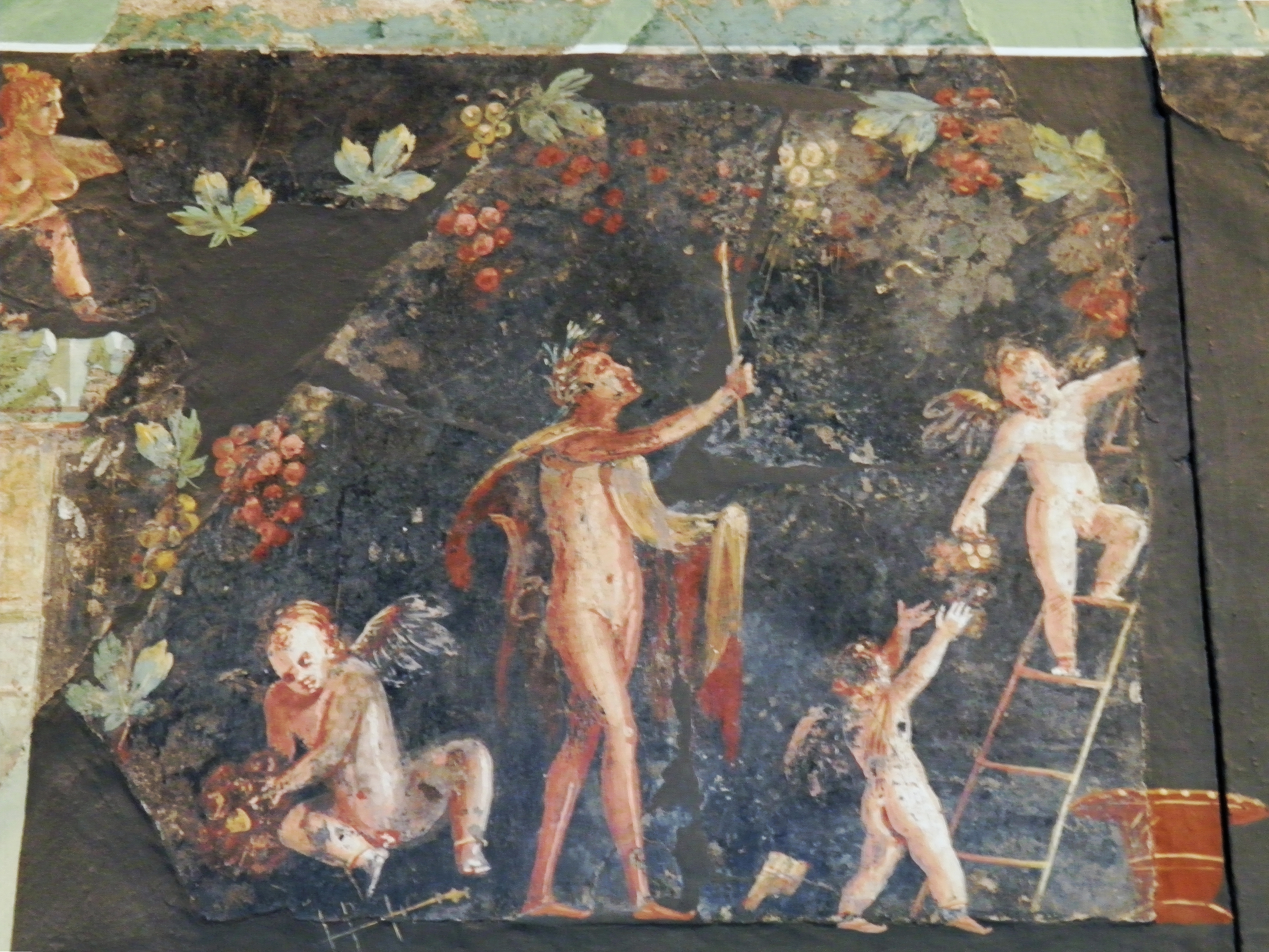
Fresco with Dionysian scenes from a Roman villa of Cologne (Colonia Claudia Ara Agrippinensium), 3rd century AD, Romano-Germanic Museum

With the founding of the province of Germania Inferior under Domitian in AD 89, the commander of the Legions of Lower Germania Colonia became the provincial governor, based in Colonia. In AD 80 a water supply was built, the Eifel Aqueduct, one of the longest aqueducts of the Roman Empire, which delivered 20,000 cubic metres of water to the city every day. Ten years later, the colonia became the capital of the Roman province of Lower Germany, Germania Inferior, with a total population of 20,000 people with around 15,000 of them inside and around 5,000 outside the city walls. (For comparison: at the same time there were some 5,000 inhabitants in Lutetia (Paris), also around 20,000 inhabitants in Augusta Treverorum (Trier), around 30,000–50,000 or more in Narbo Martius (Narbonne), between 30,000 and 60,000 people in Londinium (London), 50,000 to 100,000, and possibly up to 200,000 in Lugdunum (Lyon), and between half a million and one million in ancient Rome.)

The Rhine fleet (part of the Classis Germanica) was stationed south of the city at Alteburg. The Alteburg naval fort was a camp measuring around twelve hectares, surrounded by a vicus, a civilian settlement, just three and a half kilometers south of the ancient city, in the eastern area of today's Marienburg district of Cologne. The fortress was destroyed in attacks by the Franks in AD 276. This area was later named Alte Burg, from which come the present day names "Alteburger Wall" and "Alteburger Platz". With the elevation to provincial capital, Colonia was no longer a military base. The legions of the province were stationed in Vetera II near Colonia Ulpia Traiana (near present-day Xanten), Novaesium and Bonna. The name of the city varied in usage over time. In the 4th century AD it was known as Colonia Agrippina, which was shortened to Colonia sometime after the 5th century.

The Praetorium served as the residence as well as the administrative building of the governor of the province of Germania inferior. The governor combined in his person the military command over the Lower Germanic army (Exercitus Germaniae Inferioris) and the civil command over the province. His civil power encompassed both the judiciary and the executive and - in a regional context - the legislative power. The governor of a province, as Legatus Augusti pro praetore ("envoy of the emperor with the rank of praetor"), was always a former Roman consul. He only answered directly to the emperor. In order to carry out his tasks, an extensive administrative apparatus as well as an infantry cohort and a cavalry cohort were directly subordinate to him.

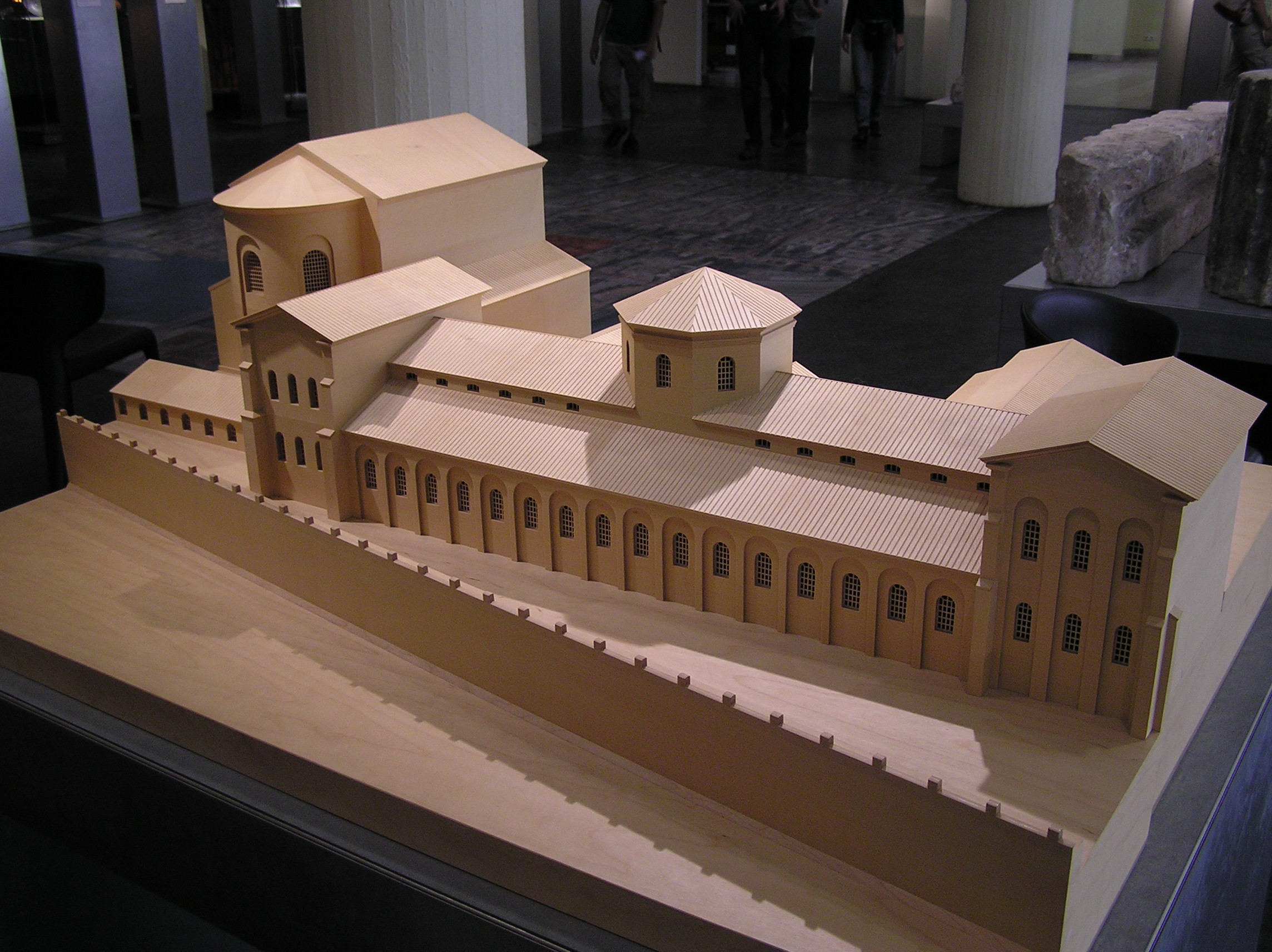
Model of the Praetorium, view from the Rhine (East), to the left the aula regia

The praetorium of the CCAA was located in the ancient city directly on the eastern city wall, northeast of the forum district. It is the only administrative building of this type in the entire Roman Empire in which the name praetorium as such is preserved in an inscription. The foundation walls can be viewed under the "Spanish Building" of the Cologne City Hall. Essentially, the building, which has seen repeated new construction and extensions throughout its history, can be differentiated into four different construction phases:

- The origins of the Praetorium may date back to 14 AD. The first building could arise from the principia of the Legio XX camp or from the praetorium (in the sense of commander's apartment) of Germanicus, who stayed in Cologne between the years 13 and 17 AD. From this period, two parallel trachyte walls, 4.20 meters apart, with a length of 148 and 173 m respectively, have been identified. The façade facing the Rhine was divided by pilasters. A little south of it, the apse of an unidentifiable part of the building, approximately eight meters in diameter, was excavated.
- A second construction phase may be attributed to the period after the events of AD 69/70. To the north of the first building, the so-called conches building with its outbuildings was built. The long parallel walls of the oldest building were divided into numerous smaller rooms by installing partition walls. Further parts of the building - some with hypocausts - were inserted into the area between the praetorium and the city wall. Including the so-called "House on the City Wall", which was connected to the main Praetorium complex via a pillared hall.
- The first phase of the third construction phase includes the planned demolition and reconstruction of large parts of the administrative palace. The large-scale renovation work was probably carried out under the governorship of the later "auction emperor" Didius Julianus, who, after his consulship in 175, resided in Cologne as governor of Lower Germania from around 180. Thanks to a building inscription by Commodus in which Didius Julianus is mentioned, the date of the renovation can be dated almost exactly to the years 184/185. Of the older buildings, only the “House on the City Wall” and the associated pillar hall were preserved. A large gallery building was created, with various smaller components adjoining it to the north. In the south, the apse building from construction phase I was replaced by a large hall, the so-called Aula regia or palace hall, the apse of which was approximately 15 m in diameter. In total, the praetorium in this construction phase extended over the area of four insulae and therefore probably took up almost 40,000 m^{2}. At an unclear point in time, the praetorium was destroyed by a devastating fire. The discovery of a coin of Constantine the Great, which was found in the rubble of the fire and was minted in the years 309 to 313, indicates that the first section of the third construction phase could have lasted for over 125 years. After that, destruction and reconstruction did not take place until the second decade of the fourth century at the earliest. However, written evidence about the praetorium is only available again for the year 355 by Ammianus Marcellinus. When Cologne was conquered by the Franks that year, the Praetorium was also affected and possibly completely destroyed.
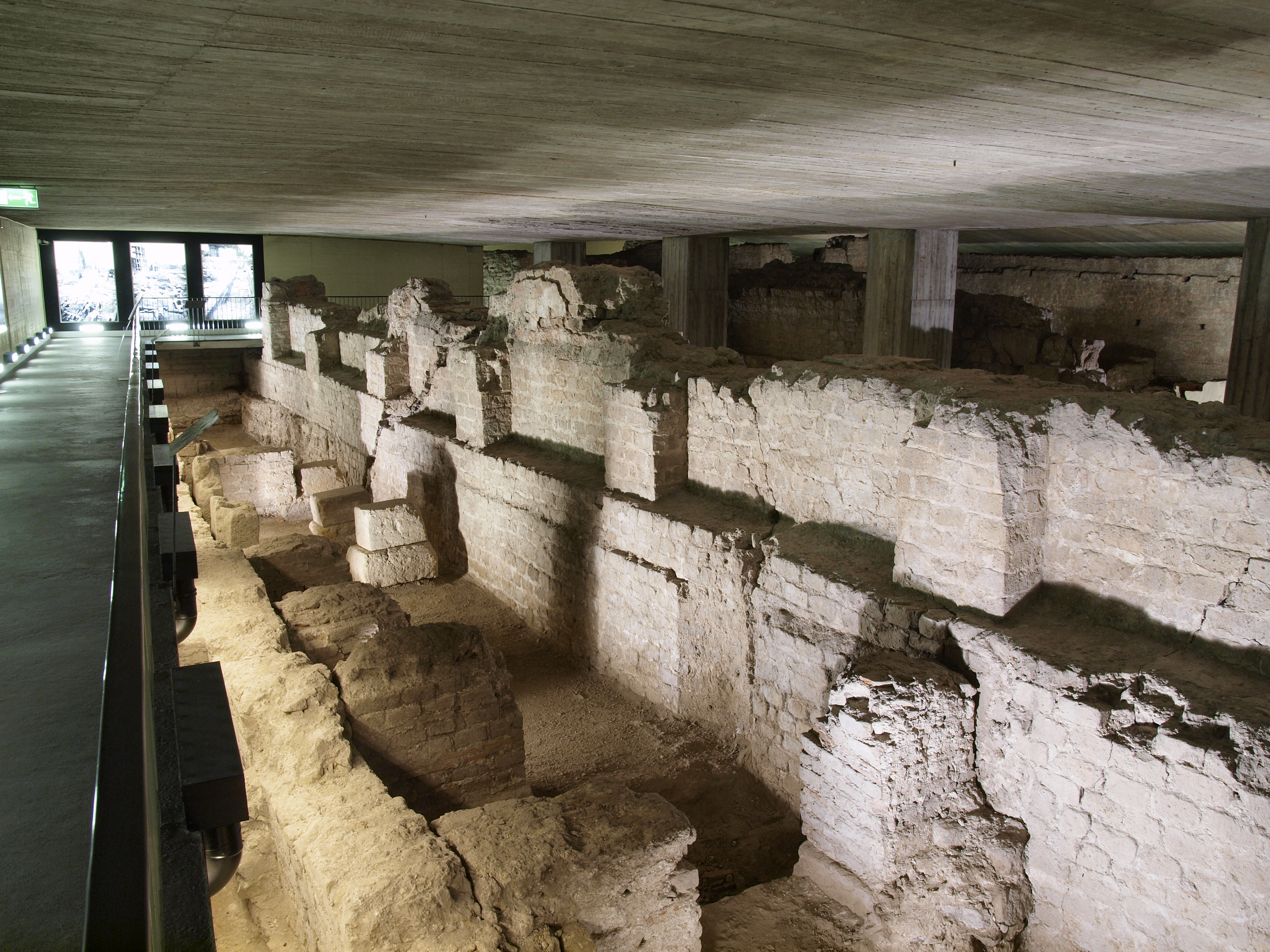
- Original foundations of the praetorium, accessible via the "archaeological zone/Jewish museum" beneath the town hall
  The reconstruction and thus the fourth and final construction phase of the Praetorium cannot be precisely timed. It may have begun immediately after the liberation of Cologne from the Franks by the Emperor Julian in 356. After an interruption, new construction continued in the last quarter of the fourth century and was finally completed in the last decade of the century. Of the older parts of the building, only the southern areas of the gallery building and the Aula Regia remained. The new main building initially consisted of a large rectangular hall, with the so-called porticus gallery in front of it facing the Rhine. At the northern and southern ends of the central building, two apsidal halls were built, whose ten-meter-diameter arches were oriented to the west. In a later phase of the expansion, an octagonal building with a circular interior with a diameter of 11.30 m was added to the center of the main building. The octagonal building divided the central building into two halls, each around 250 m^{2} in size.
- The praetorium later served as a royal palace (Pfalz) for the Merovingian kings of Francia and was destroyed during the reign of Charlemagne around 780/790, possibly by a natural disaster.

=== Late antiquity and the end of Roman rule, Aftermath ===
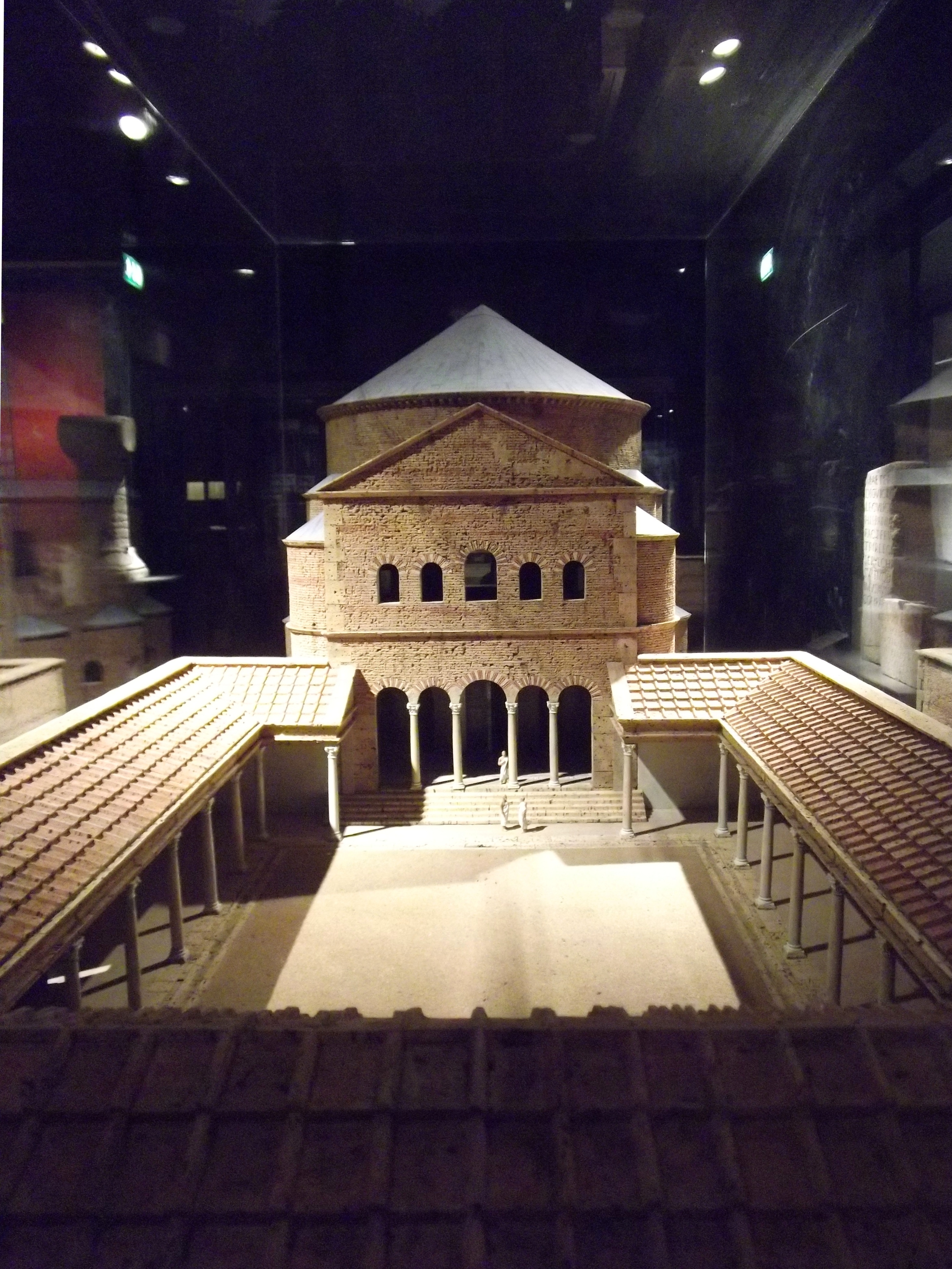
Model of the late antique mausoleum with vestibule and atrium that is still preserved in the decagon part of St. Gereon's Basilica

In AD 260 Postumus made Cologne the capital of the Gallic Empire, which included the Germanic and Gallic provinces, Britannia and the provinces of Hispania. The Gallic Empire lasted only fourteen years. By the 3rd century, only 20,000 people lived in and around the town as the city was badly affected by the crisis of the 3rd century. In AD 310, Emperor Constantine I had a bridge over the Rhine constructed; this was guarded by the castellum Divitia (nowadays "Deutz") on the other side of the Rhine, thus in the unoccupied Germania Magna.

In AD 321 Jews are documented in Cologne in a letter of protection from Constantine; when exactly the first Jews arrived in the Rhineland area cannot be established any more, but Cologne's Jewish community claims to be the oldest north of the Alps. Although their religion was recognized as religio licita ("permitted religion" – in contrast to Christianity before Constantine), at the same time they were exempt from the Roman imperial cult and sacrifices to the Roman state gods. However, these were a basic requirement for holding public office. (See: History of the Jews in Cologne.)

Colonia had to be temporarily abandoned in December 355 following a lengthy siege by the Franks. The archaeological strata of that time indicate that conquest and looting had catastrophic effects and the city lay in ruins. The Praetorium was reconstructed and enlarged circa 375 A.D. as seen in the model of the Roman-German Museum in Cologne. The mausoleum that is still preserved in the decagon part of St. Gereon's Basilica was probably built between 350 and 365. The last dated reconstruction is from 392/393, when Arbogast, the Magister Militum of the Western half of the Empire, in the name of the emperor Eugenius renewed an unspecified public building. The city finally fell to the Ripuarian Franks in AD 459. Two lavish burial sites near the Cathedral date from this period of late antiquity.

When Franconian kingdoms (such as Austrasia) formed with the fall of Roman rule, the Roman-influenced urban settlements in the Rhineland also largely disappeared. Only a few places – such as Cologne, Trier (Augusta Treverorum) and Mainz (Mogontiacum) – remained continuously populated within the Roman city layout with a significantly reduced population in the migration period and the Early Middle Ages. Cologne, which was inhabited by up to 20,000 people in late Roman antiquity, had around 3,000 inhabitants in the year 700, making it the second largest city in the Rhineland after Trier (5,000). However, the trend was reversed in the High Middle Ages and late Middle Ages: While Trier grew from around 4,000 inhabitants in 1120 to around 10,000 in 1430, only half as many as in ancient times, Cologne quadrupled its population in the same period to 40,000, twice as many as in Roman times. But precisely because Cologne grew rapidly in the Middle Ages and beyond, many Roman buildings disappeared in the course of new development. We still don't know where the Cologne amphitheater was located (while the Trier one still exists). In return, Cologne received twelve Romanesque churches, in addition to an immense cathedral, and again acquired great prosperity through trade and customs on the Rhine as well as through exquisite craftsmanship that far exceeded that which was already advanced in antiquity. (See: History of Cologne.)

== Architectural monuments and archaeological findings ==
- City wall

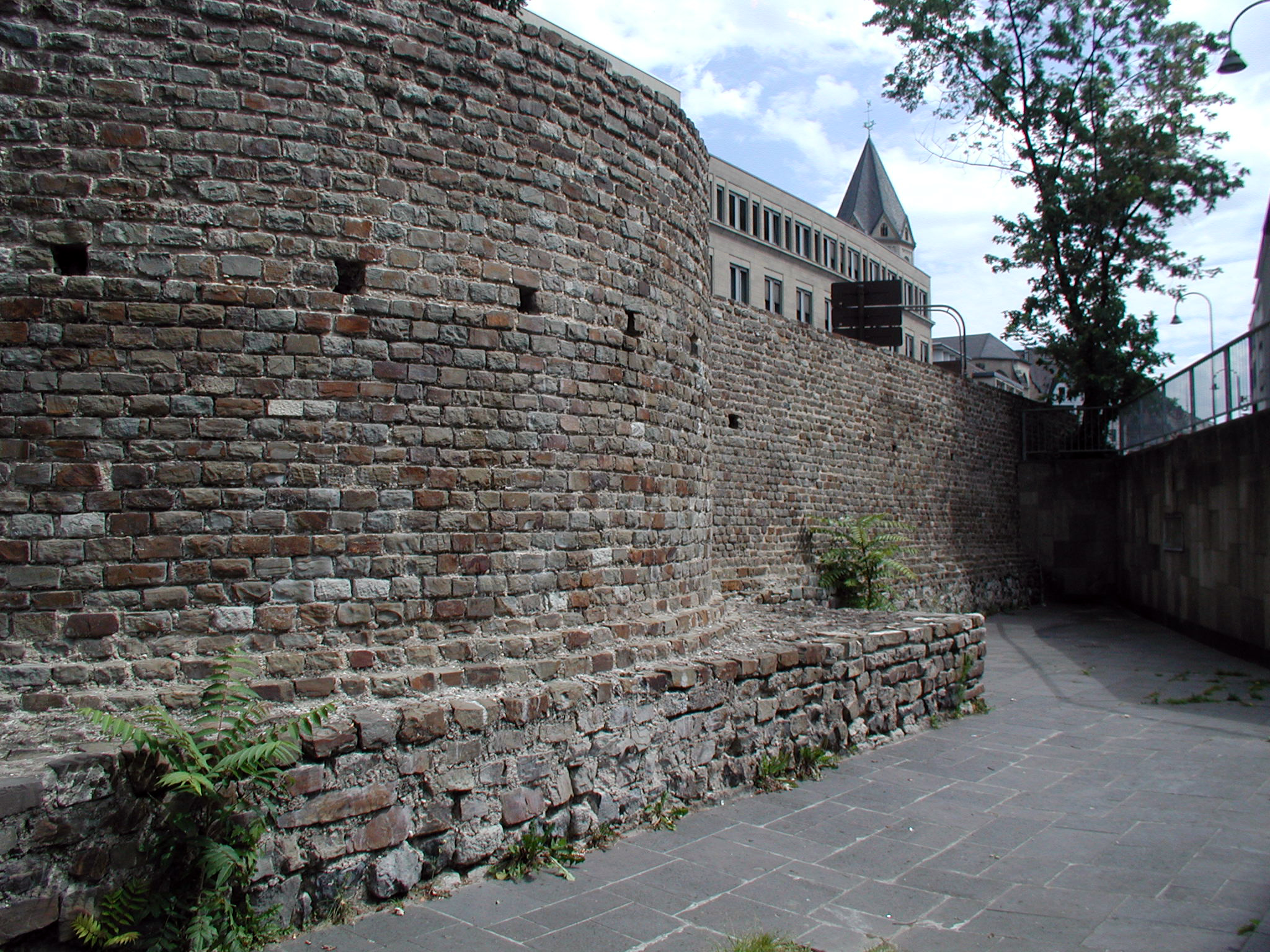
Remains of the Roman city wall with the Lysolph Tower (both lower than they once were)

Shortly after becoming a Roman colony, Colonia Claudia Ara Agrippinensium (CCAA), the Romans began building the new, almost four kilometer long city wall, which was provided with 19 towers and nine gates. The 19 towers rested on foundation slabs measuring 9.80 m by 9.80 m each. One of the towers is the well-preserved northwest tower "Roman Tower", built around 50 AD. The wall was over 3.9 kilometers long and covered an area of approximately 97 hectares. It was designed according to a uniform concept, was based on the topographical conditions of the site and essentially reproduced the contours of the flood-free plateau. Only on the east side of the colony did it descend deep into the Rhine meadow. The city wall was reinforced with a total of 19 towers at a distance of between 77 and 158 m. The city's tourism office offers walking tours along the remains of the Roman wall or corresponding brochures. In the Middle Ages, the city grew quickly and numerous new districts were incorporated with new walls and gates, most recently from 1180 to 1259 with a new circular wall on a rampart, which now enclosed 401 hectares. The major ring roads today follow the course of the medieval wall, parts of which are also still preserved.

- Streets

The city gates opened up the street system with the streets that are still important today. The grid of Roman streets can still be seen in the street plan of today's Cologne. Today's Hohe Straße developed from the cardo maximus, and Schildergasse developed from the decumanus maximus. Breite Strasse, Brückenstrasse, Glockenstrasse, Sternengasse and Agrippastrasse lie above Roman streets, and many streets trace the course of the city wall.

- Forum

As in every major Roman city, the forum district was located in the center of the CCAA, at the intersection of Cardo and Decumanus Maximus. The entire forum district of ancient Cologne probably comprised six insulae ("apartment blocks"). In the area of the two western insulae, the square was closed off by a large ring cryptoporticus, an underground hall complex, the outer diameter of which was around 135 m. The city's sanctuary, the Ara Ubiorum, is probably to be found in this underground structure. Above the crypto portico, on the ancient walking level, there probably rose a portico, a colonnaded hall of corresponding size open to the actual square - the forum.

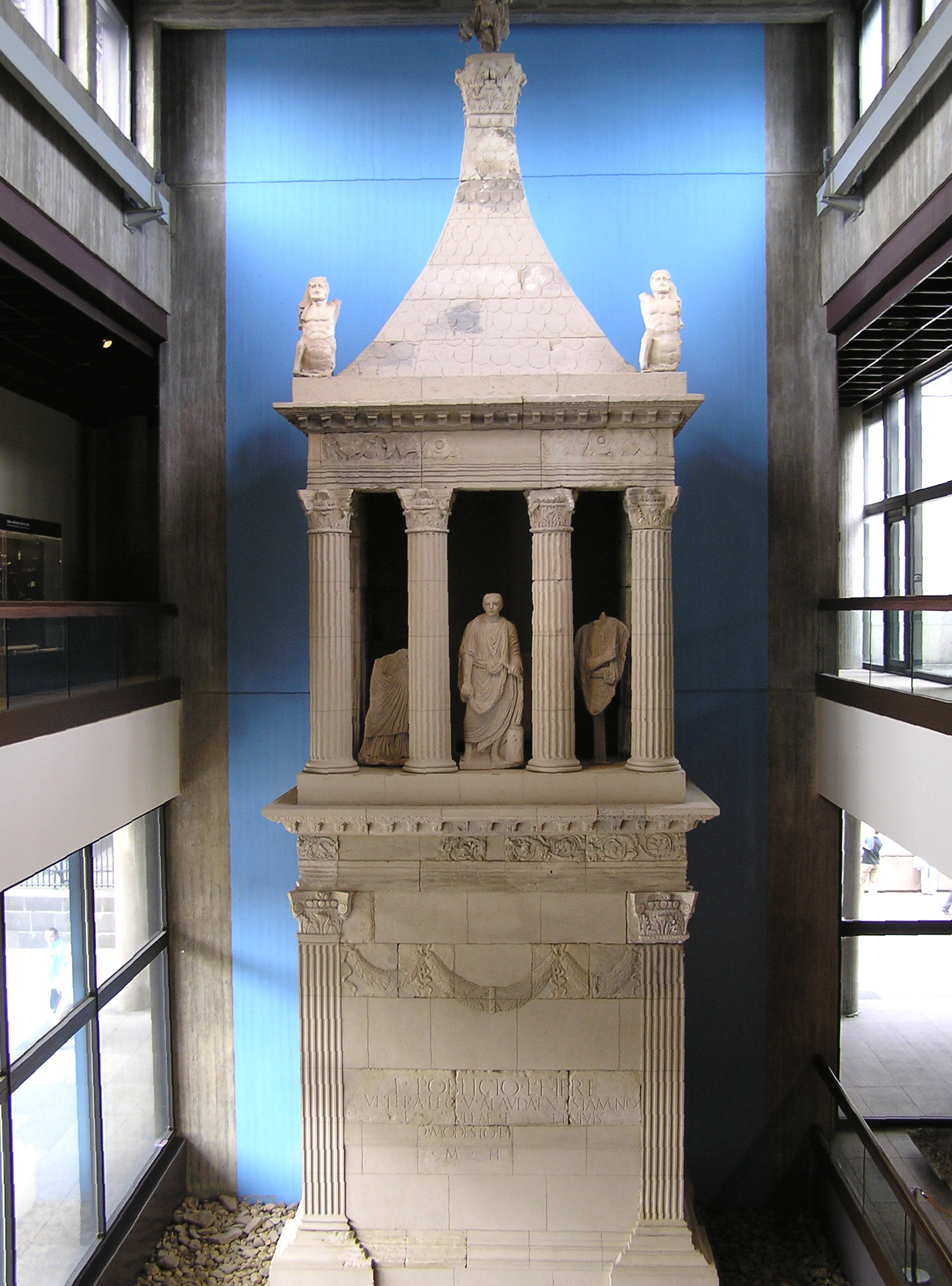
Sepulchre of Poblicius, 40 AD, Romano-Germanic Museum

- Temples and early Christian churches

Following the urban Roman model, there was also a Capitol temple in CCAA, a sanctuary of the Capitoline Triad, which was dedicated to the gods Jupiter, Juno and Minerva, on whose site the church of St. Mary in the Capitol was built in the 11th century. It is located in the southern old town at "Marienplatz". A temple to Mars is also documented. In front of the actual entrance there was an archway, the Porta Martis. The street names "Marspfortengasse", "Obenmarspforten" and "Marsplatz" still indicate its former location. The temple itself probably stood at the location of today's Wallraf-Richartz Museum.

The existence of an early Christian cult space in Cologne is reported by Ammianus Marcellinus in the year 355. It is not known where this cult room was located. The first bishop known by name was Maternus (c. 285–315 AD), who must have already had an episcopal church. Church buildings have been documented in the area of Cologne Cathedral since the early Middle Ages at the latest, but the continuity of an episcopal church at this location since late antiquity cannot be ruled out. It could also be that this spot, directly on the northern wall of the ancient city, was originally the private house in which the first (perhaps still illegal) early Christian community met to hold services and baptisms. A supposed baptismal font from the garden of this house is in the cathedral.

Of the late antique buildings, a central building of unknown use (presumably a mausoleum) in front of the northwest corner of the city wall is particularly worth mentioning, the polygonal core of which with a total of eight horseshoe-shaped apses was later transformed into today's St. Gereon's Basilica building. The partially exposed Roman substance, which is still up to 16.50 meters high, makes this monument one of the best-preserved Roman buildings in Cologne in their original location.

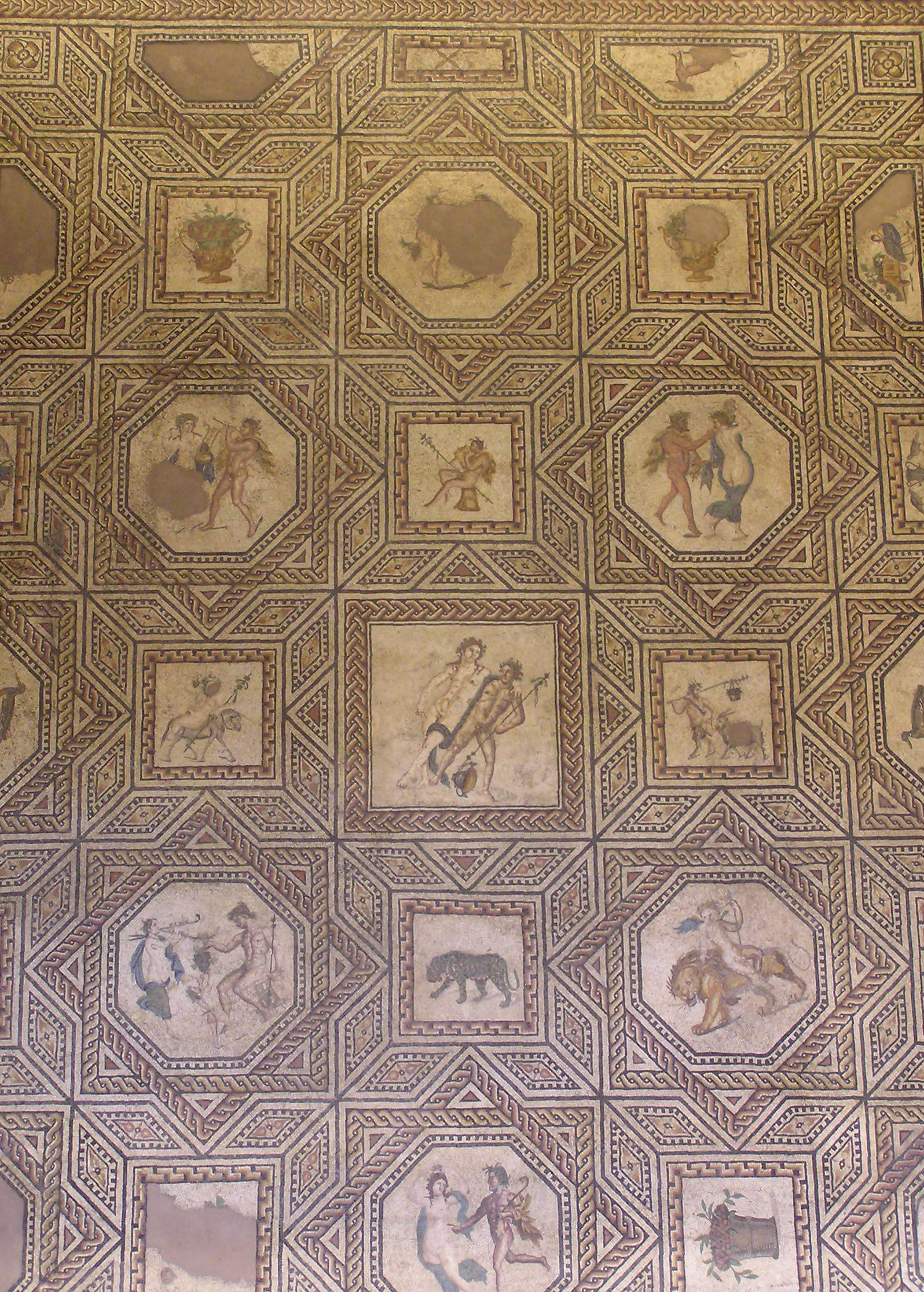
Section of the Dionysus mosaic (220-230 AD) in the Romano-Germanic Museum

- Library

In Summer 2018, archaeologists declared that the foundations (located at 50°56′09.6″N 6°57′12.8″E) that they discovered in 2017 during excavations to build a Protestant church, might be related to the "oldest known library in Germany", dating back to the 2nd century. The library, which has characteristics similar to those of the Library of Celsus in the ancient city of Ephesus, might have contained more than 20,000 scrolls.

- Other

The location of the amphitheater (mentioned in inscriptions) has not yet been discovered. Due to the ongoing redevelopment of the city, little is known of the ancient residential buildings. Nevertheless, over 36 residential buildings with mosaic floors have now been located. On the Rhine front stood the so-called Peristyle House with the Dionysus mosaic, whose mosaic was in situ integrated into the Romano-Germanic Museum. The museum also has the task of preserving the Roman cultural heritage of Cologne, and therefore houses an extensive collection of Roman glass from funerals and burials. The Roman CCAA was known for artistic glassmaking, the museum thus has the world's largest collection of locally produced glass from the Roman period. There is also an array of Roman and medieval jewellery, artefacts of everyday life, ivory and bone objects, bronzes, coins, wall paintings, grave stones, inscriptions, pottery and architectural fragments.

== See also ==
- Roman governors of Germania Inferior
- History of Cologne
- History of the Jews in Cologne
- List of Roman sites
- List of Roman colonies
