= Bean-nighe =

Female spirit in Scottish folklore

The bean-nighe (Scottish Gaelic for 'washerwoman' or 'laundress'; Scottish Gaelic pronunciation: [pɛˈɲi.ə]) is a female spirit in Scottish folklore, regarded as an omen of death and a messenger from the Otherworld. She is a type of ban-sìth (Irish: bean sídhe, anglicized as "banshee") that haunts desolate streams and washes the clothing of those who are about to die. Les Lavandières is the French word under which these "night washerwomen" are perhaps best known. She is also called nigheag, 'the little washer', nigheag na h-ath, 'little washer of the ford', or nigheag bheag a bhroin, 'little washer of the sorrow'.

== Legends ==
The bean-nighe, also known as the Washing Woman or Washer at the Ford, is seen in lonely places beside a stream or pool, washing the blood from the linen and grave-clothes of those who are about to die. Her characteristics vary depending on the locality, and differing traditions ascribe to her the powers of imparting knowledge or the granting of wishes if she is approached with caution. It is said that mnathan-nighe (the plural of bean-nighe) are the spirits of women who died giving birth and are doomed to perform their tasks until the day their lives would have normally ended. It was also believed that this fate could be avoided if all the clothing left by the deceased woman had been washed. Otherwise, she would have to finish this task after death.

On the Isles of Mull and Tiree she was said to have unusually long breasts that interfere with her washing so she throws them over her shoulders and lets them hang down her back. Those who see her must not turn away, but quietly approach from behind so that she is not aware. He should then take hold of one of her breasts, put it in his mouth, and claim to be her foster-child (see Milk kinship). She will then impart to him whatever knowledge he desires. If she says the clothing she is washing belongs to an enemy, then he can allow the washing to continue, but if it belongs to himself or any of his friends, then he can stop her from completing her task and avoid his fate.

On the Isle of Skye the bean-nighe was said to have a squat figure resembling a "small pitiful child". If a person catches her she will reveal to him his ultimate fate. She answers all his questions but he must also truthfully answer hers in return. If however the bean-nighe sees him first then he will lose the use of his limbs.

In Perthshire she was described as small and rotund and dressed in green, and can be caught by getting between her and the stream.

The bean-nighe is sometimes said to sing a mournful dirge as she washes the clothing of someone who is about to meet a sudden death by violence. She is often so absorbed in her washing and singing that she can sometimes be captured. If a person can seize hold of her after a stealthy approach, then she will reveal who is about to die and will also grant three wishes. Hence, when a man would be successful in his work of some phase of his life the people would often say "Mary! The man got the better of the nigheag, and she gave him his three choose desires". She is sometimes described as having various physical defects, including having only one nostril; a large, protruding front tooth; or red webbed feet.

One popular Highland story connected with the washing of death shrouds regards the so-called "Mermaid of Loch Slin". A maiden from Cromarty was walking along a path by the side of this loch one Sabbath morning, and after turning a corner she saw a tall woman standing in the water "knocking claes" (clothes) on a stone with a bludgeon. On a nearby bleaching-green, she observed more than thirty smocks and shirts, all smeared with blood. Shortly following the appearance of this figure, the roof of Fearn Abbey collapsed during worship service, burying the congregation in debris and killing thirty-six people. Historically, the abbey roof did collapse in 1742, with the death toll reckoned at nearly fifty.

One folktale collected by Alexander Carmichael in the Carmina Gadelica, Vol. II, runs as follows:

In the dead watch of the night, ‘Gille-cas-fliuch’, Wet-foot Man, of Great Clanranald of the Isles, was going home to Dun-buidhe in the upland of Benbecula— ben of the fords. And when he was westering the loch, whom should he see before him in the vista on the ‘clachan’, stepping stones, but the washer woman of the ford, washing and rinsing, moaning and lamenting—

“A leineag bheag basis na dorn,
A mailaran broin na beul.”

Gille-cas-fliuch went gently and quietly behind ‘nigheag’ and seized her in his hand. “Let me go,” said nigheag, “and give me the freedom of my feet, and that the breeze of reek coming from thy grizzled tawny beard is a-near putting a stop to the breath of my throat. Much more would my nose prefer, and much rather would my heart desire, the air of the fragrant incense of the mist of the mountains.” “I will not allow thee away,” said Gille-cas-fluich, “‘till thou promise my me three choice desires.” “Let me hear them, ill man,” said nigheag. “That thou wilt tell to me for whom thou art washing the shroud and crooning the dirge, that thou wilt give me my choice wife, and that thou wilt keep abundant seaweed in the creek of our townland as long as the earl of Sgeir-Iois shall continue his moaning.” “I am washing the shroud and crooning the dirge for Great Clanranald of the Isles, and he shall never again in his living life of the world go thither nor come hither across the clachan of Dun-buidhe.” Gille-cas-fliuch threw the shroud of death into the loch on the point of his spear, and he flew home hard to the bedside of Clanranald. He told everything that he saw and heard and that befell him. Clanranald leaped his hard round leap on to his feet from the heath-bed, and he ordered a cow to be felled and a little coracle to be made ready. A cow was felled accordingly, and a little coracle was constructed, in which Clanranald went from the island over the loch to the mainland, and he never again returned Dun-buidhe in the upland on Benbecula.’

== Etymology ==
A bean-nighe ('washerwoman') is a specific type of ban-sìth.

Both the Irish bean sídhe and the Scottish Gaelic ban-sìth (both meaning 'woman of the sídhe', 'fairy woman' or 'woman of peace') are derived from the Old Irish ben síde, 'fairy woman': bean: 'woman', and sídhe: the genitive of 'fairy'.

In Scottish Gaelic, ban-sìth(e) also occurs as bean-shìth(e). Both are correct.

Sìth in Scottish Gaelic (síd in Old Irish, also means 'peace'), and the fairies are referred to as the daoine-sìth (Irish: daoine sídhe), the 'people of peace'. Sídhe, in its variant spellings, refers to the sídhe (mounds) where these beings dwell.

The bean-nighe is sometimes known by the diminutives ban-nigheachain ('little washerwoman') or nigheag na h-àtha ('little washer at the ford').

== See also ==
- Beira
- Cailleach
- Caoineag
- Hulder
- The Morrígan
- Moura Encantada
- Wirry-cow
- Slattenpatte
