= Caoineag =

Female spirit in Scottish folklore

The caoineag (Scottish Gaelic pronunciation: [ˈkʰɯːɲak]) is a female spirit in Scottish folklore and a type of Highland banshee, her name meaning "weeper". She is normally invisible and foretells death in her clan by lamenting in the night at a waterfall, stream or Loch, or in a glen or on a mountainside. Unlike the related death portent known as the bean nighe, the caoineag cannot be approached, questioned, or made to grant wishes. Other local names for her include caointeag, caoineachag, caointeachag, and caoidheag.

== Characteristics ==
The Scottish folklorist Alexander Carmichael in Carmina Gadelica states that she foretells the death of those slain in battle, and that her mourning and weeping cause much anxiety to parents whose sons are in the wars. Before the Massacre of Glencoe, the caoineag of Clan MacDonald was heard to wail night after night. Those whose fears were roused by her keening left the glen and escaped the fate of those who remained behind. Fragments of the dirges said to have been sung by the caoineag before the massacre were collected by Carmichael:

Little caoineachag of the sorrow
Is pouring the tears of her eyes
Weeping and wailing the fate of Clan Donald
Alas my grief that ye did not heed her cries

There is gloom and grief in the mount of mist
There is weeping and calling in the mount of mist
There is death and danger, there is maul and murder
There is blood spilling in the mount of mist

== Caointeach ==
The caointeach is another version of this death spirit attached to various clans in Islay. When a death from illness was about to occur, she would appear outside the sick person's house wearing a green shawl and begin lamenting at the door. In one account, she is said to have been banished from the premises after having been pitied and given a gift of clothing to cover herself, much like traditions of the brownie and the Cauld Lad of Hylton. She is sometimes conflated with the bean nighe who haunts desolate streams and washes the clothing of those about to die, but in this context the caointeach is more formidable. If she is interrupted she will strike at a person's legs with her wet linen and the victim will lose the use of them.

Caointeach is also the spelling alternative given by Edward Dwelly in his dictionary of Scottish Gaelic, where she is defined as a "female fairy or water-kelpie".
