= West Highland Museum =

Museum in Highland, Scotland

Coordinates: 56.8177°N 5.1111°W

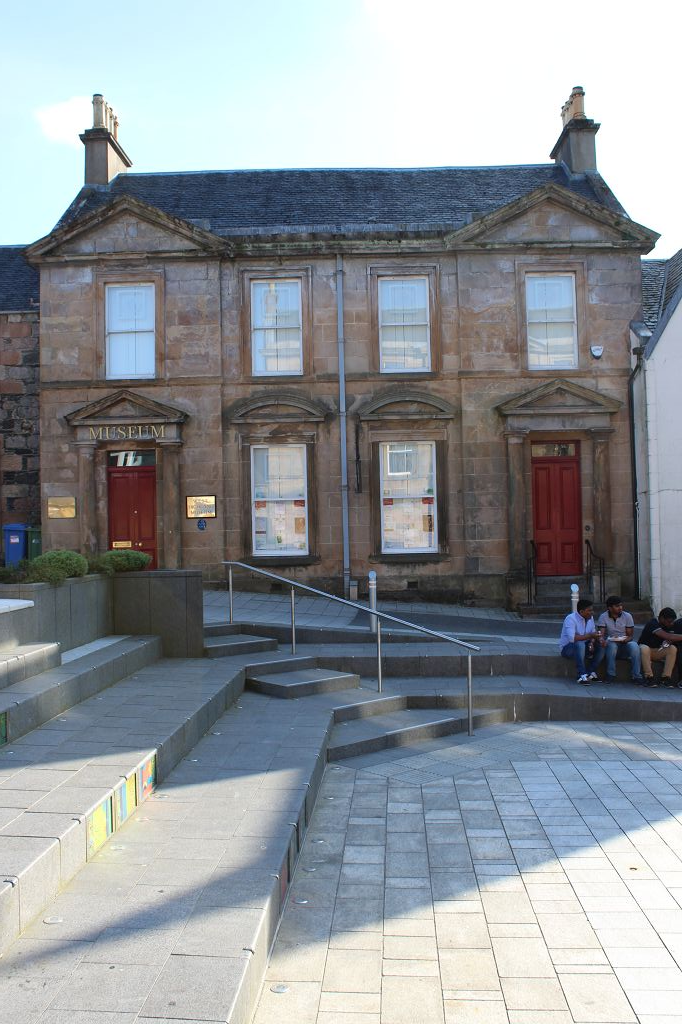
- West Highland Museum, Fort William

- Location within Highland
- Location: Cameron Square; Fort William, Highland, Scotland

The West Highland Museum (Scottish Gaelic: Taigh-tasgaidh na Gàidhealtachd an Iar) tells the story of the Scottish Highlands and the Islands. It aims to cover every aspect of West Highland history, including that of Fort William, where it is located in a listed building in the centre of the town. It also hosts other exhibits for archaeology and wildlife.

== History ==
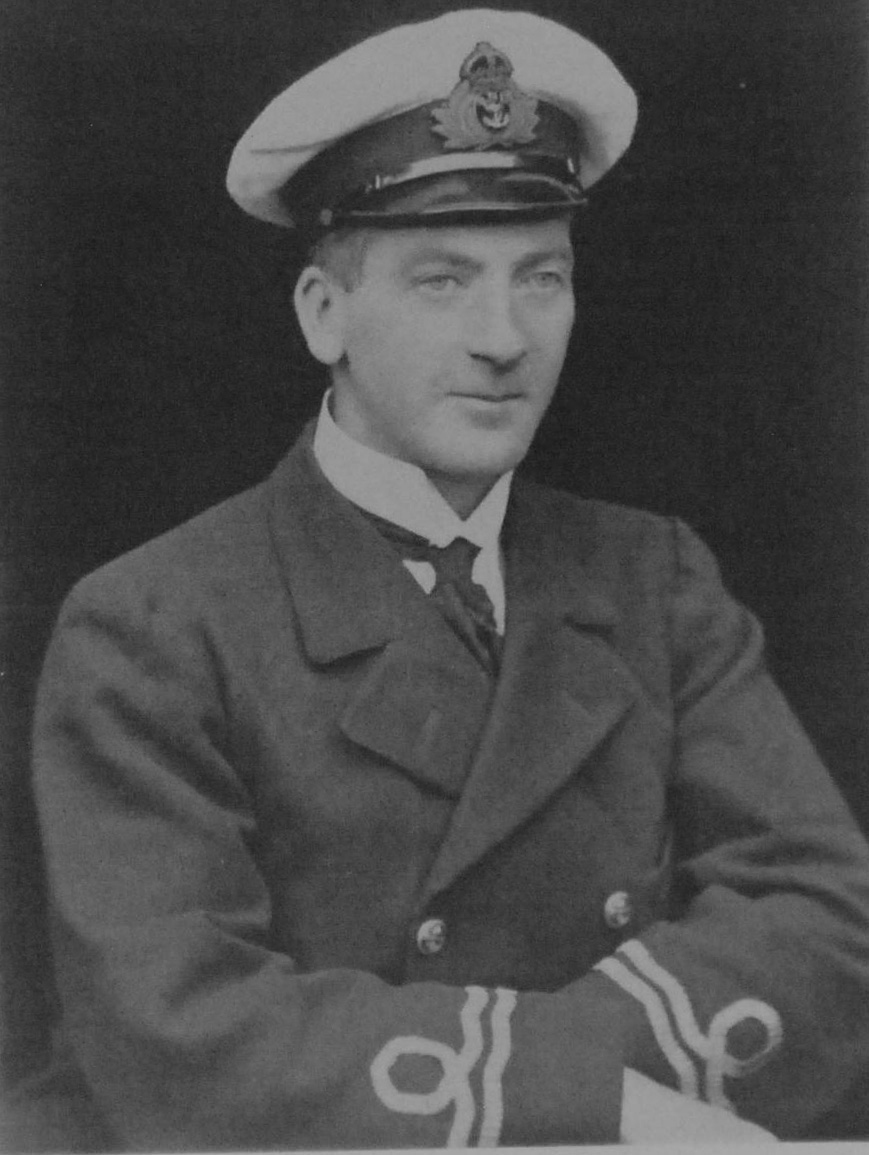
Victor Hodgson, founder

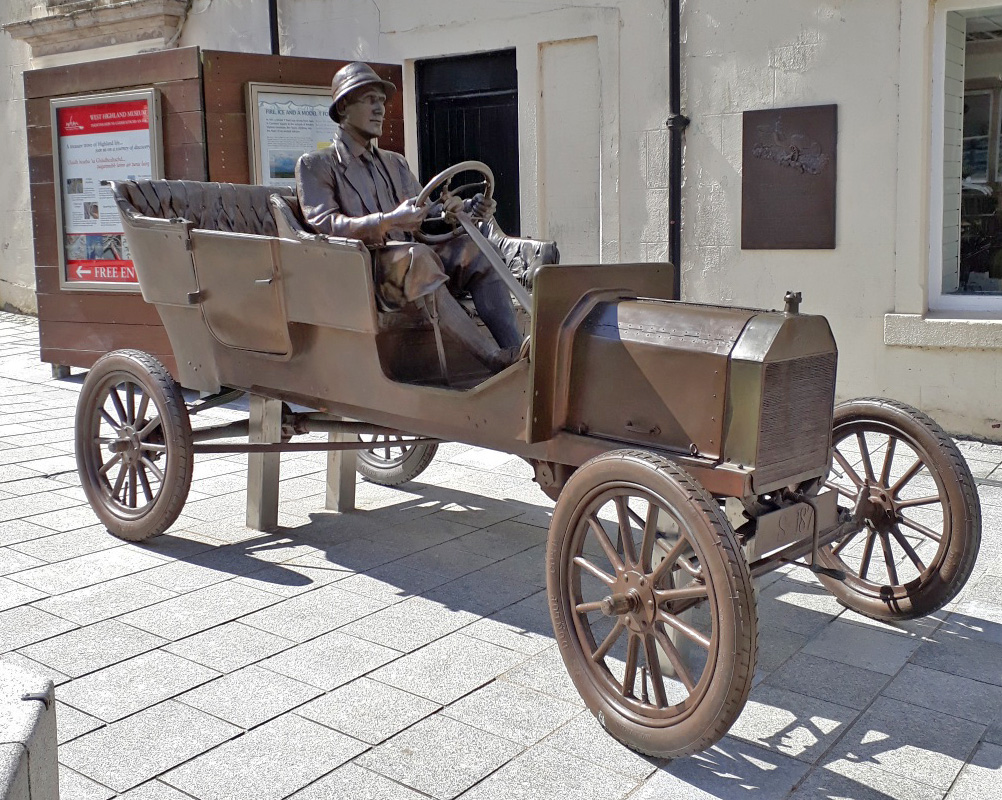
Full-scale bronze replica of the Model T that climbed Ben Nevis

The West Highland Museum was founded in 1922 by Victor Hodgson (1875–1929), who gathered exhibits and books and displayed them in the Public Reading Room in Monzie Square. In 1925 funds were raised and the following year part of the present premises in Cameron Square, the British Linen Bank branch, was purchased. After more fund raising in the 1960s, an adjacent building to the south was purchased. The Museum is B listed and one of the oldest buildings in town.

In response to declining visitor numbers, the museum ceased charging for entry in 2011. In 2010 the museum had 9152 visitors. This rose to 31315 the following year on the abolition of entry charges and has increased annually to 60806 in 2019. The museum recorded a million visitors between 1979 and 2014. It now has three part-time paid staff who operate with the support of approximately 40 volunteers.

== Collection ==
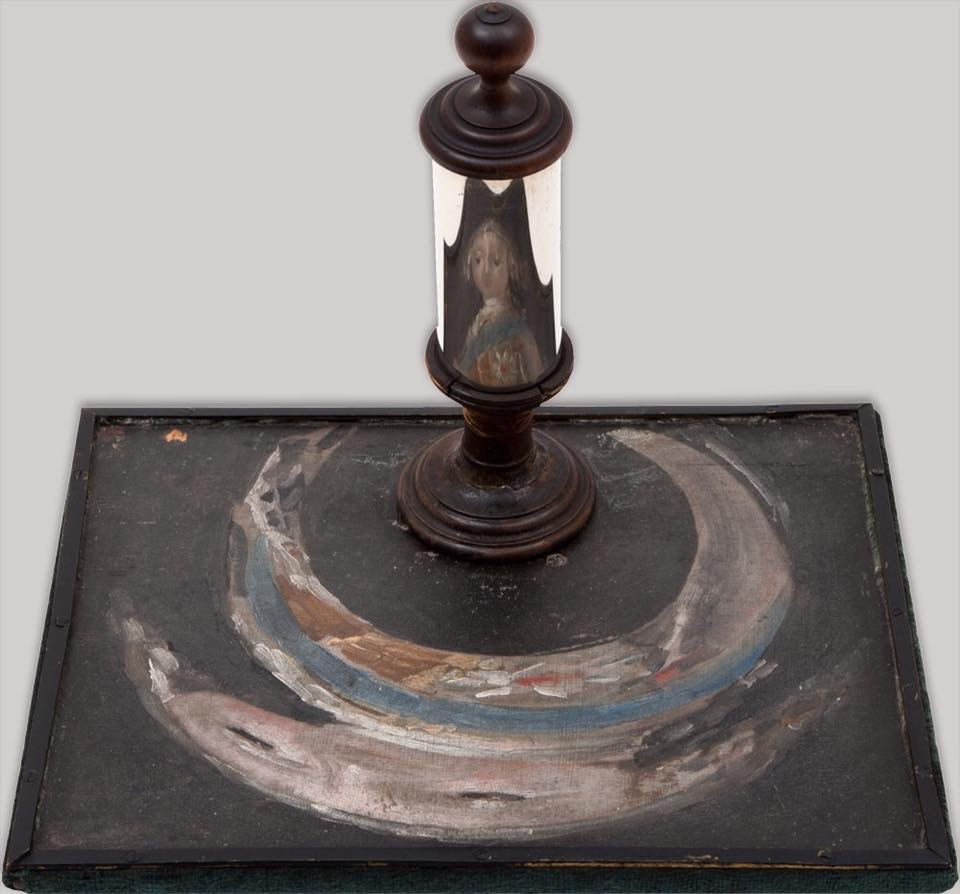
The secret portrait of Charles Edward Stuart

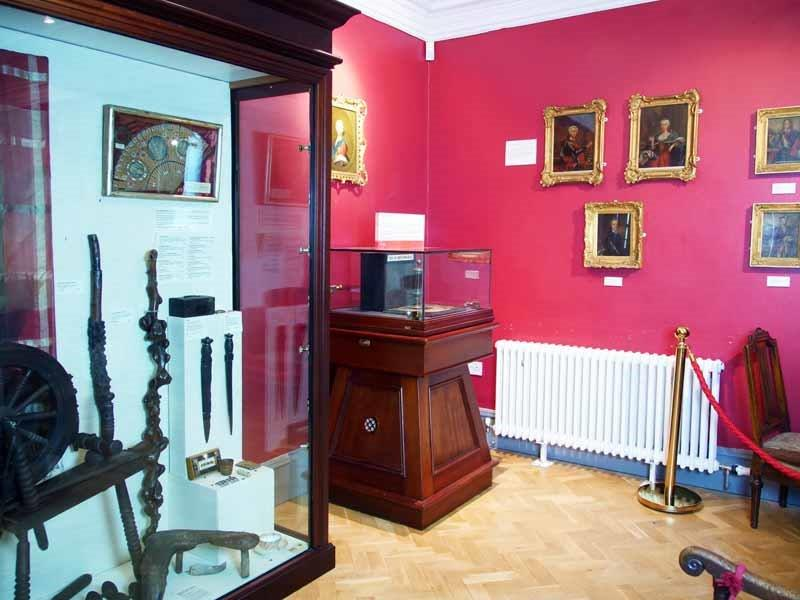
Room 6. Jacobite portraits

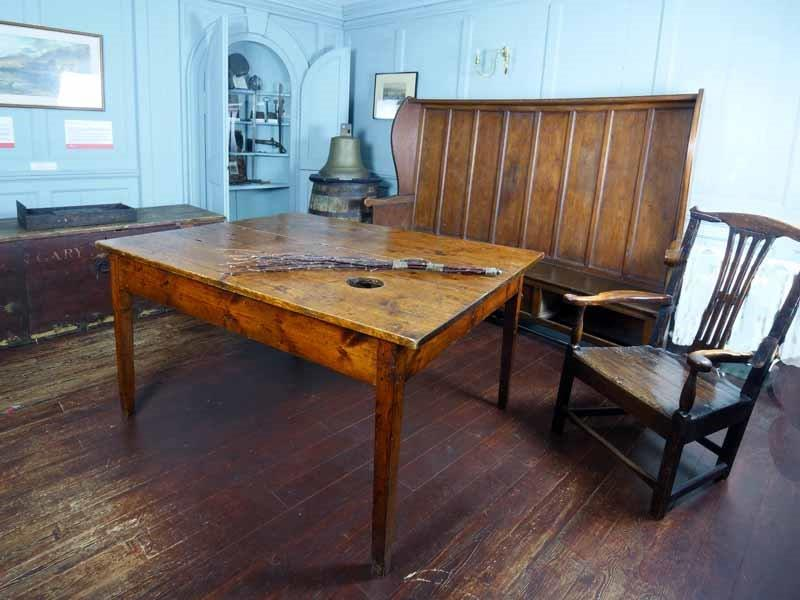
The Governor's Room, with birching table

The museum has eight rooms on three floors, with an extensive collection of exhibits relating to the Jacobites, including the 18th century "secret portrait" of Bonnie Prince Charlie which Victor Hodgson found in a London junk shop. Apparently random marks on the base were focused by the cylindrical mirror to show the Prince's image, a painting technique known as anamorphosis. The mirror would be removed when the owners needed to hide their loyalty. Later royalty is represented by a collection of Victoriana, including the regalia gifted by Queen Victoria to her favourite servant, John Brown.

The museum covers military history, focusing on the Commando Basic Training Centre, set up during the Second World War at Achnacarry Castle near Spean Bridge. In 1936, during the demolition of the fort, the museum was gifted the pine panelling of the governor's room, which it used to create its own Governor's Room. This room also contains the birching table belonging to the burgh (i.e. the town council) of Fort William, used to restrain people subject to judicial corporal punishment; birching was last used to chastise an offending youth in 1948. The round, mahogany wine table in this room is reputed to have belonged to Colonel John Hill, Governor of the fort at the time of the Massacre of Glencoe in 1692. Hill met MacIain, chief of the Glen Coe MacDonalds, in the fort prior to the massacre.

The museum displays the material artefacts collected by Alexander Carmichael (1832–1912), the Gaelic folklorist best known for his six-volume Carmina Gadelica, an influential but controversial compendium of edited Highland lore and literature. The museum has a collection of bagpipes of interest to scholars. The oldest of these are claimed to have been played at the Battle of Bannockburn in 1314, while another pair was said to have been given to Bonnie Prince Charlie. The experts are sceptical.

Its latest significant acquisition was in November 2020. With grants from The Art Fund and The National Fund for Acquisitions (administered by National Museums Scotland on behalf of the Scottish government), the museum acquired Autumn in Knoydart. This painting was by Sir David Young Cameron, who was, during his lifetime, a member of the museum. Cameron also raised funds in 1928 for the purchase of the Strange Plate, a Jacobite copper plate for printing bank notes, commissioned by The Prince from Robert Strange and subsequently lost or abandoned. D. Y. Cameron printed a number of notes from the plate and more have been printed in 2021 as part of the museum's planned centenary celebrations.

The Rough Guide describes the museum as "splendidly idiosyncratic".

== Accessibility ==
Sited in an old building, the museum does present challenges to people with mobility problems. There is, however, a stairlift which enables many visitors with limited mobility to visit both floors of the display area. This can make it possible for wheelchair users to get to the upper floor.

== Governance ==
The West Highland Museum Trust was incorporated as a company limited by guarantee on 15 November 2017 and has company number 581556. It was also registered as a charity on 24 November 2017 and has the Scottish charity number SC 047954.

The West Highland Museum Trust commenced operating the Museum from 1 January 2018, prior to which the governing body was the West Highland Museum, which was administered through a trust deed and had charity number SC 014287.

== Awards ==
In 2021 the museum received the Queen's Award for Voluntary Service. The presentation was made by Donald Cameron of Lochiel, Lord Lieutenant of Inverness-shire.

== Future plans ==
With support from the Scottish Land Fund the museum has recently acquired an adjacent shop with a High Street frontage and is currently planning the integration of this building and an old barn to the rear into the museum to provide additional space for exhibitions, storage, education and administration.
