= Charles Bunworth =

Irish rector and harpist

Reverend Charles Bunworth
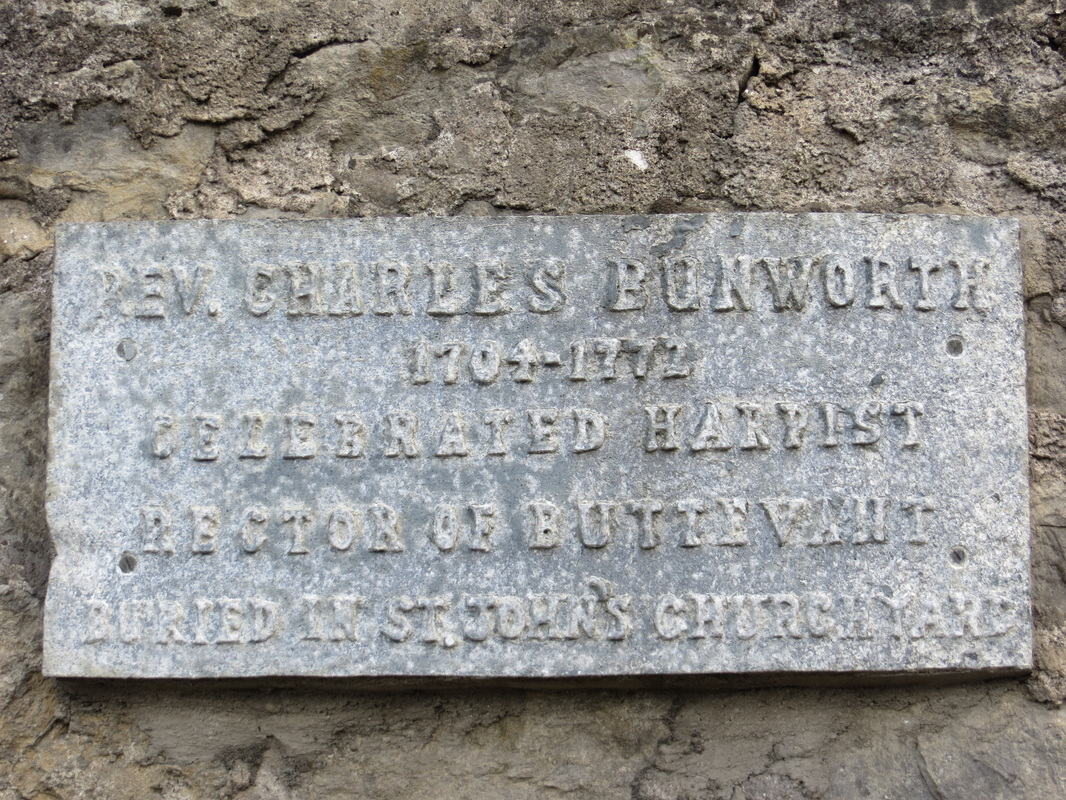
- Church: Church of Ireland
- Diocese: Cork, Cloyne and Ross

Orders
- Ordination: 15 March 1731

Personal details
- Born: 1704 Freemount, County Cork, Ireland
- Died: 14 September 1772 (aged 68) Buttevant, County Cork, Ireland
- Parents: Richard Bunworth; Elizabeth Philpot
- Spouse: Mary Delacour
- Children: Elizabeth Bunworth (b. 1744); Mary Bunworth (b. 1746)
- Education: Trinity College Dublin

Reverend Charles Bunworth was an Irish harpist and the Church of Ireland rector of Buttevant, County Cork. Born in 1704, he graduated from Trinity College, Dublin with an M.A. in Divinity Studies in 1730 and was ordained the following year. He was a renowned patron of the arts and a skilled harpist. He died in 1772 at the age of 68 and is buried in the churchyard of St John’s, Buttevant.

== Biography ==
=== Life and family ===
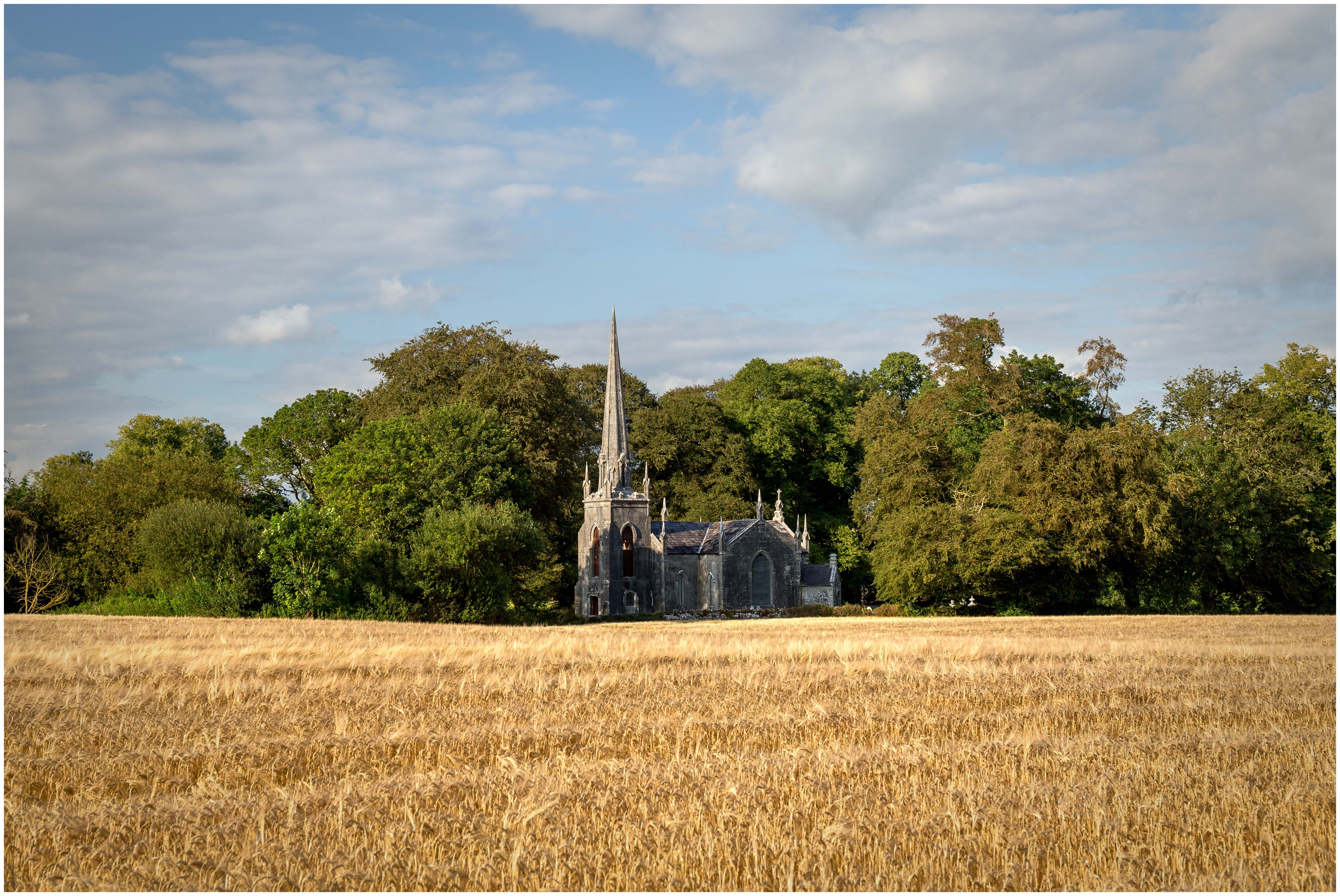
St. John's Church, Buttevant

Bunworth was born into a farming family in Freemount, near Newmarket, County Cork in 1704. Both of his parents were also born and raised in Newmarket. His mother was Elizabeth Bunworth (née Philpot), granddaughter of Sir Robert Travers (MP), great granddaughter of Richard Boyle, the Archbishop of Tuam, and an older relative of Irish patriot John Philpot Curran. His father was Richard Bunworth (d. 1727), a former colonel in the Williamite army who fought in both the Battle of the Boyne and the Siege of Limerick. Charles was the second of at least three sons. He had an old brother Peter (b. 1699) and a younger brother Richard.

He was home-schooled by a family tutor, Mr. Murdock, and enrolled in Trinity College Dublin on 4 April 1723 as a pensioner, indicating that his family was middle class, of moderate means. He achieved his BA in 1727, and graduated with an M.A. in Divinity Studies in 1730. He moved to Cloyne and was ordained a deacon that same year. On 15 March 1731 he was fully ordained as a priest in the Church of Ireland. He served as the rector of Knocktemple in northern County Cork until 1736, after which he was appointed the prebendary of Cooline until 1740. He became the Vicar of Bregoge in 1740, a position he held for the remainder of his life.

In 1742, Bunworth married Mary Delacour of Cork, and they had two daughters, Elizabeth (b. 1744) and Mary (b. 1 July 1746). Bunworth's daughter Mary married Croker Dillon, and their eldest daughter Maria was the mother of Thomas Crofton Croker, thus making Bunworth Croker's great-grandfather. Bunworth was a learned scholar and had an intimate knowledge of the Classics. Prior to John Philpot Curran's entry into Trinity College he was examined by Bunworth, who was so impressed by the young Curran that the reverend gave him financial assistance for his studies. Bunworth also tutored Barry Yelverton, who became a prominent lawyer and politician.

Bunworth was renowned for his skill as a harpist, his knowledge of Irish music and his patronage of bards and harpers. A fluent speaker of Irish, between 1730 and 1750 Bunworth was chosen five times as President of the local cúirt éigse (meeting of the bards), which was held every 3 years in Bruree, County Limerick. Other positions he held within the Church of Ireland included rector of Buttevant (1742–72), the town in which he and his family resided, vicar of Tullylease (1748–72) and vicar of Kilbrin (1764–72).

He died on 14 September 1772 and was buried in the churchyard of Saint John's, Buttevant. Affectionately known as "the minister" by the area's Catholic residents, he enjoyed cross-community admiration and the locals looked to Bunworth "in matters of difficulty and in seasons of distress, confident of receiving from him the advice and assistance that a father would afford to his children". According to Crofton Croker, he was "a man of unaffected piety, and of sound learning; pure in heart, and benevolent in intention, by the rich he was respected and by the poor beloved."

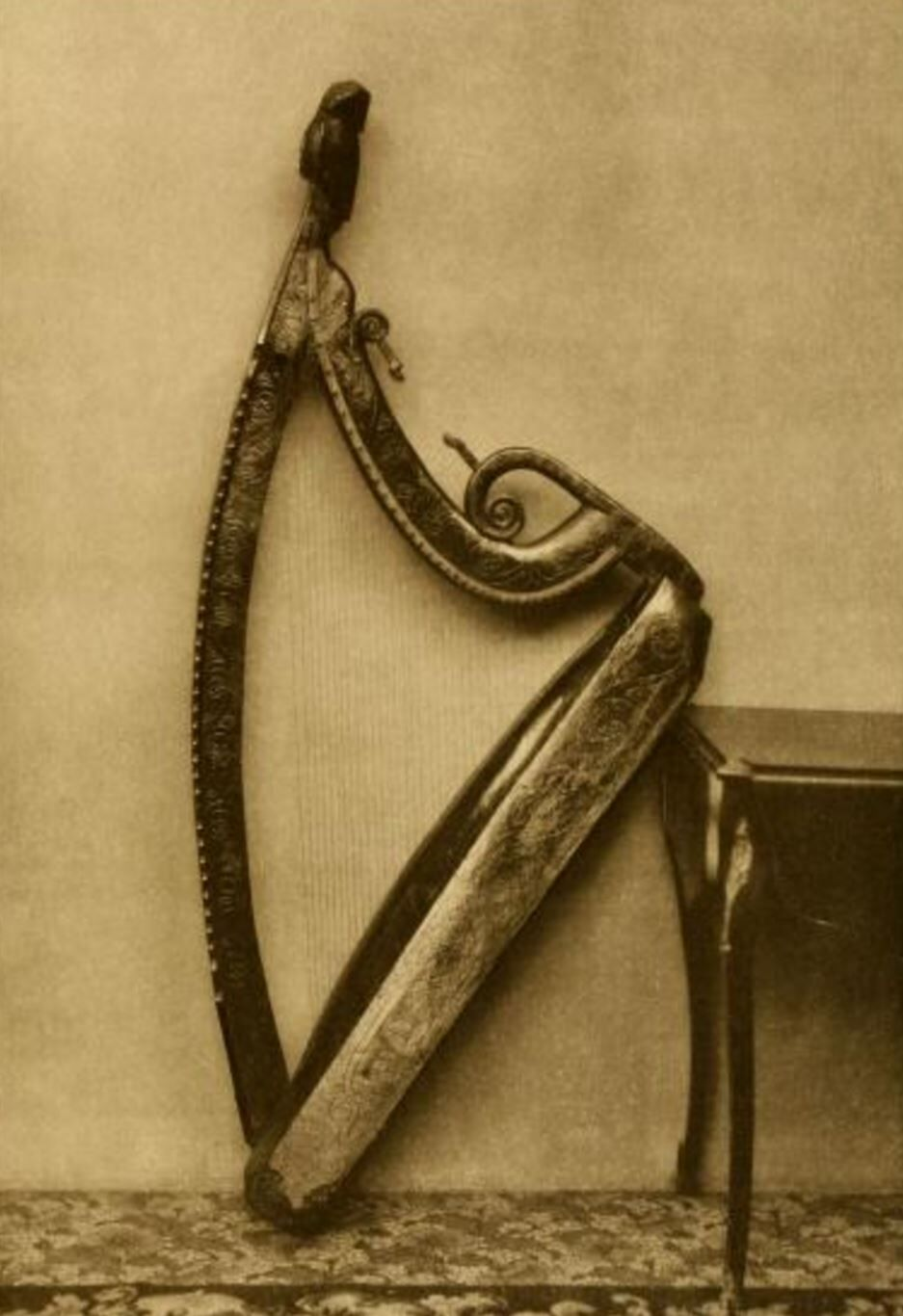
The Bunworth Harp

=== Patronage of the arts ===
Bunworth's interest in, and patronage of, traditional culture extended to both bardic poetry and harp music. However, the two art forms can be seen as interrelated. As Professor Pádraig Breatnach notes "Perhaps the most important feature of Irish poetry in the eighteenth century is that it is poetry in song". Most poetry of this time was recited with an air and often accompanied by music. The cúirt éigse which Bunworth attended were chances for poets and musicians to meet, perform and exchange notes.

The harp was the aristocratic instrument of Gaelic Ireland, and harpers enjoyed a high social status which was codified in Brehon Law. The patronage of harpers was adopted by Norman and British settlers in Ireland until the late 18th century, although their standing in society was greatly diminished with the introduction of the English class system. In his biography of Turlough O'Carolan, historian Donal O'Sullivan writes:

We may note as a remarkable fact that the descendants of Protestant settlers, who had been at most for three generations in the country, seem to have been just as devoted to the Irish music of the harp as were the old Gaelic families.

This observation very much aligns with Charles Bunworth, a Protestant rector born of a Williamite father.

Apart from his own musical skill, Bunworth was renowned for his hospitable reception and entertainment of the class of impoverished travelling musicians. In return for his generosity they wrote songs of blessing and praise about him and his two daughters, whose charms were greatly celebrated by the harpers. When news of his death spread, many of these musicians visited his house to pay their respects, with some depositing harps in the loft of his granary as a final gesture of gratitude.

After he died, Bunworth's prized collection of harps was largely destroyed when the family moved to Cork for a temporary change of scenery, leaving a servant in charge of their Buttevant home. Ignorant of their value, the servant broke apart the great majority of these harps and used them as firewood.

Among Bunworth's collection was a large cláirseach, today known as the "Bunworth Harp". The front of the harp bears the inscription "Made by John Kelly, for the Rev. Charles Bunworth, Ballydaniel, 1734". By 1829 the harp was in the possession of Miss Dillon, Bunworth's granddaughter, who was also a skilled harpist. It was then inherited by Thomas Crofton Croker and auctioned off in London after his death in 1854. It is currently housed in the Museum of Fine Arts, Boston and is the only known example of an early wire-strung harp outside of Ireland or Britain.

== The Bunworth Banshee ==
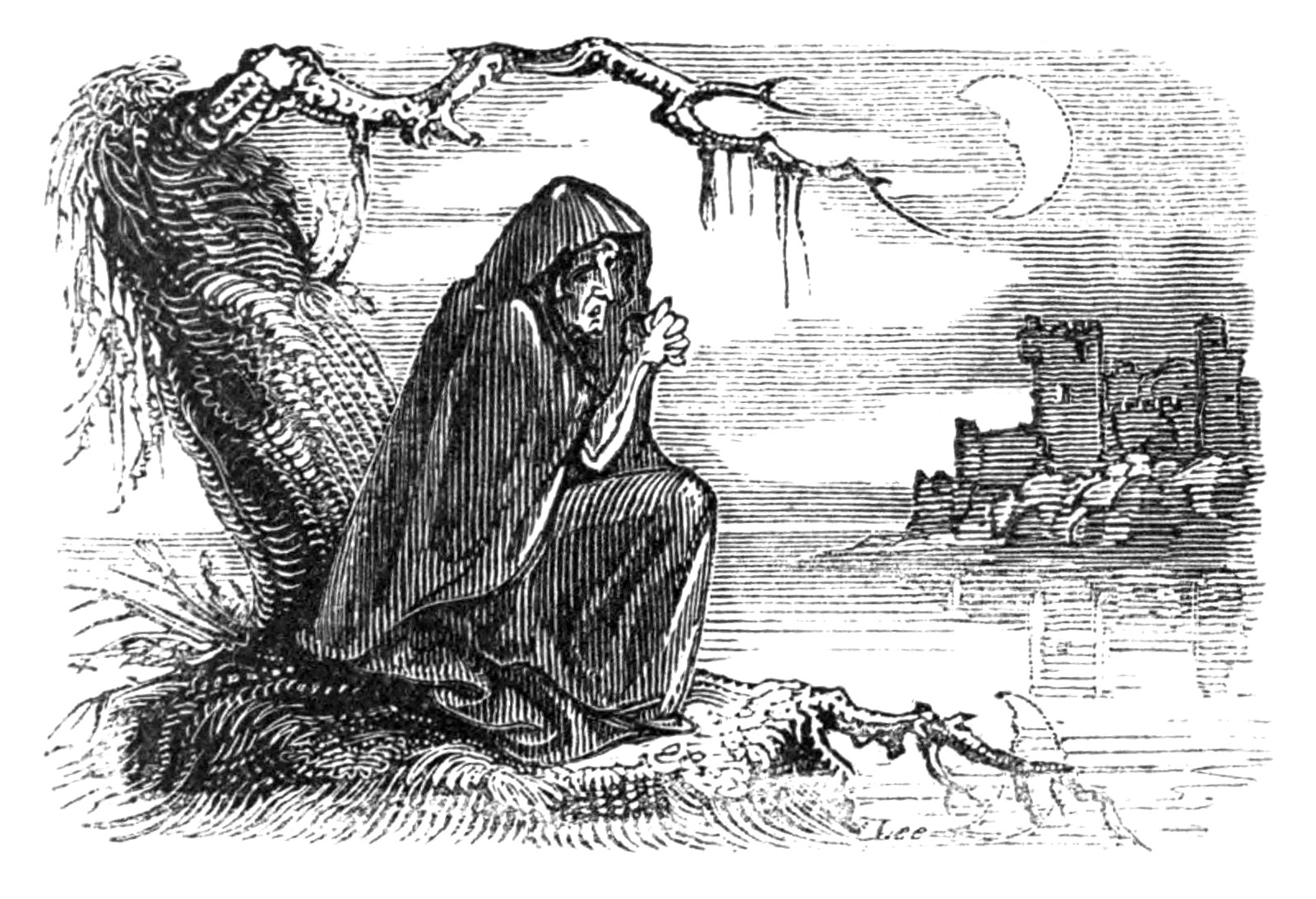
Bunworth Banshee, Fairy Legends and Traditions of the South of Ireland, 1825

The events surrounding the death of Charles Bunworth are the subject of an entry on the banshee in Thomas Crofton Croker's Fairy Legends and Traditions of the South of Ireland (1825–1828), published around 50 years after Bunworth's death. A banshee was said to have been seen and heard by several people around the area a week before his death, and on the eve of his passing. At the time of his death there were no mentions of this supernatural occurrence in biographic references to the Rev. Bunworth, and Croker does not mention his sources, simply stating:

there are still living credible witnesses who declare their authenticity, and who can be produced to attest most, if not all, of the following particulars.

Genealogical records show that Croker was a great-grandson of the Rev. Bunworth, suggesting that the account of these events may have been a family legend that Croker collated from his relatives.

=== Legend overview ===
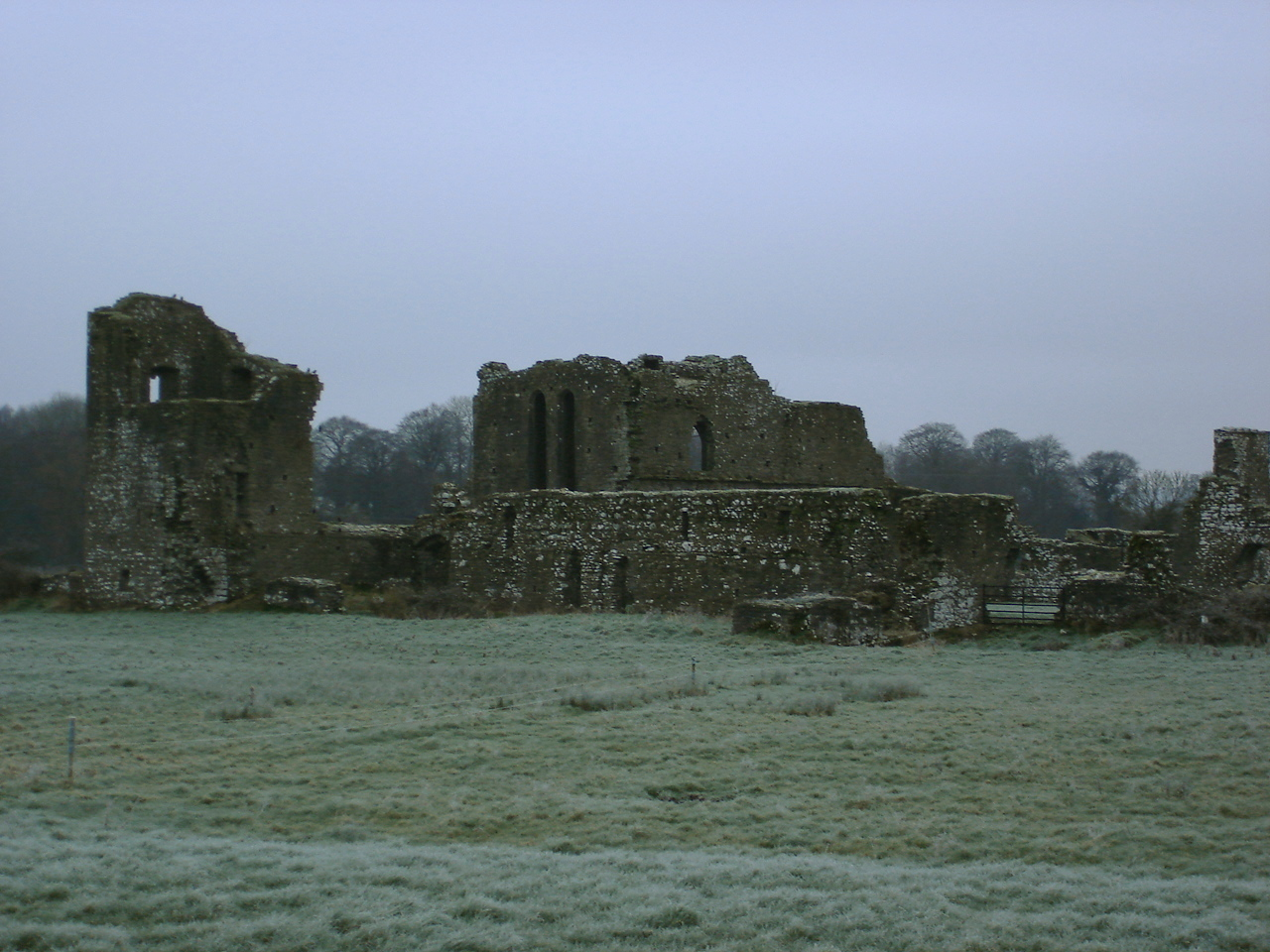
Ballybeg Priory

One week before the reverend's passing, a Mr. Kavanagh, the herdsman for the Bunworth estate, departed for Mallow to pick up medicine for the Rev. Bunworth, who had fallen ill but whose condition was not thought to be terminal. He returned to the house around 11pm and delivered the medicine to one of Charles' daughters, referred to as 'Miss Bunworth' in Croker's retelling. Kavanagh seemed very agitated and, when questioned by Miss Bunworth, he was overcome with grief and burst into a flood of tears, saying "the master, Miss, he is going from us".

Miss Bunworth asked Kavanagh if there was anything he had heard in Mallow which led him to believe that her father's condition was worsening, to which Kavanagh replied no. Although he did not sound drunk, his crying and flustered expression led Miss Bunworth to accuse Kavanagh of drinking. She scolded him and said that she would speak to him in the morning when he was in a fitter state. He assured her he had not been drinking and wrung his hands together, repeating "Miss, he is going from us surely--we will lose him--the master-we will lose him, we will lose him!...the Banshee has come for him, Miss; and 't is not I alone who have heard her."

Miss Bunworth dismissed this as idle superstition but Kavanagh insisted that a banshee with long, white hair and a black cloak followed him through the grounds of Ballybeg Priory keening, screeching, clapping her hands and, on occasion, calling out the reverend's name. The banshee then sat under a tree that had been struck by lightning and began "keening so bitterly, that it went through one's heart to hear it". The illustration provided with the entry in Croker's book is of this scene. Miss Bunworth tried to comfort Kavanagh, stating that her father's condition was improving and that hopefully he himself would soon be able to convince Kavanagh that there was nothing to worry about. Nevertheless, she insisted that Kavanagh tell no one else what he had seen, as she did not want him to frighten the servants.

Over the next week the Rev. Bunworth's health unexpectedly declined. The night before his death he was attended by an elderly woman who was a friend of the family. His two daughters, exhausted from constantly caring for their father, were told to get some repose. At his own request, the reverend's bed was moved downstairs to the parlour and positioned beside the window, as he sought a change of scenery from his bedroom. Bunworth was much loved and respected in the community and many locals were gravely concerned by the strange happenings which seemed to forebode the reverend's demise. As was common at times of serious illness, people gathered at the house, mainly in the kitchen, with a smaller group of close friends in a room adjoining the parlour, the door to which was left open.

The night was calm, clear and moonlit. The stillness of the night was interrupted when a rose bush growing outside the parlour window was forced aside with some noise and a low female moaning was heard, accompanied by the clapping of hands. The moaning sounded as if whoever was doing it was holding their mouth close to the window, and the elderly woman attending the sleeping reverend rushed into the adjoining room and asked if anyone else could hear the cry of the banshee.

Two men hastily rose to their feet, skeptical of any supernatural explanation, and ran outside to find the culprit. As soon as they exited the front door they were met with complete silence. They inspected the entire perimeter of the house. The ground around the window had recently been dug, meaning that if the rose bush had been pushed aside by human hands footprints would have been left in the dirt, although none could be found. The moonlight provided excellent visibility and the two men, hoping to dispel the mystery, searched along the road leading to the house, but to no avail. The grounds around the house were silent and deserted.

Upon returning to the house they were surprised to learn from the other guests that, rather than silence, the clapping and moaning had intensified the entire time they were gone. The moment the men closed the front door behind them, they again heard the mournful sounds. The Rev. Bunworth worsened with every succeeding hour and, as the first glimpse of morning appeared, he expired.

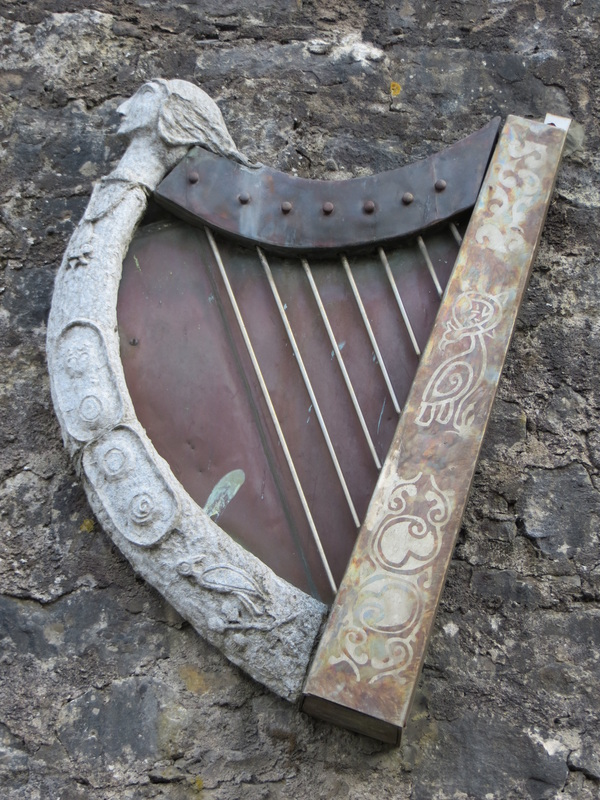
Bunworth's harp-shaped memorial plaque in Buttevant

== Legacy ==
In 1995, a harp-shaped plaque was erected outside of Bunworth's former home in Buttevant and unveiled by Robert Warke, Bishop of Cork, Cloyne and Ross. An accompanying inscription reads: "Rev. Charles Bunworth, 1704 - 1772, Celebrated Harpist, Rector of Buttevant, Buried in St. John's Churchyard". Bunworth and his music were commemorated in a festival of local music held in Buttevant.

American instrumentalist TD Cruze released a song entitled "The Bunworth Banshee" in 2010, which was included in the album Irish eyes in 2013. Lo-fi artist Karnival Kreep released a song, also entitled "The Bunworth Banshee", in 2020.

Numerous replicas of the Bunworth Harp have been crafted by harpists across the world.

== See also ==
- Derek Bell (musician)
- Edward Bunting
- Patrick Byrne (musician)
- Turlough Carolan
