= Banshee =

Female spirit in Irish mythology

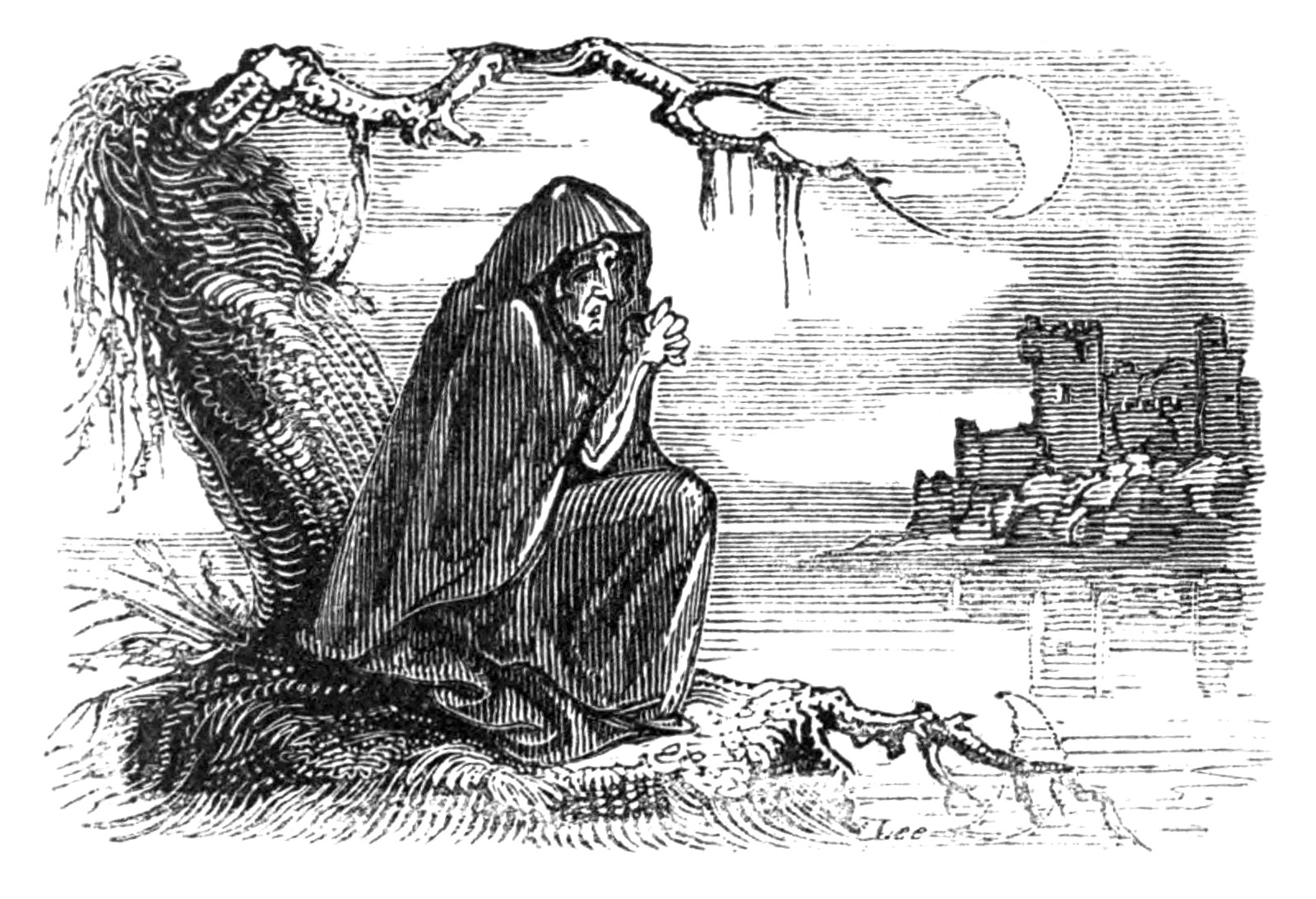
Bunworth Banshee, Fairy Legends and Traditions of the South of Ireland, by Thomas Crofton Croker, 1825

A banshee (/ˈbænʃiː/ BAN-shee; Modern Irish bean sí [bʲanˠ ˈʃiː], from Old Irish: ben síde [bʲen ˈʃiːðʲe], "woman of the fairy mound" or "fairy woman") is a female spirit in Irish folklore who heralds the death of a family member, usually by screaming, wailing, shrieking, or keening. Her name is connected to the mythologically important tumuli or "mounds" that dot the Irish countryside, which are known as síde (singular síd) in Old Irish.

== Description ==
Sometimes she has long streaming hair, which she may be seen combing, with some legends specifying she can only keen while combing her hair. She wears a grey cloak over a green dress, and her eyes are red from continual weeping. She may be dressed in white with red hair and a ghastly complexion, according to a firsthand account by Ann, Lady Fanshawe in her Memoirs. Lady Wilde in her books provides others:

The size of the banshee is another physical feature that differs between regional accounts. Though some accounts of her standing unnaturally tall are recorded, the majority of tales that describe her height state the banshee's stature as short, anywhere between one foot and four feet. Her exceptional shortness often goes alongside the description of her as an old woman, though it may also be intended to emphasize her state as a fairy creature.

Sometimes the banshee assumes the form of some sweet-singing virgin of the family who died young, and has been given the mission by the invisible powers to become the harbinger of coming doom to her mortal kindred. Or she may be seen at night as a shrouded woman, crouched beneath the trees, lamenting with a veiled face; or flying past in the moonlight, crying bitterly: and the cry of this spirit is mournful beyond all other sounds on earth, and betokens certain death to some member of the family whenever it is heard in the silence of the night.

In John O'Brien's Irish-English dictionary, the entry for Síth-Bhróg states:

"hence bean-síghe, plural mná-síghe, she-fairies or women-fairies, credulously supposed by the common people to be so affected to certain families that they are heard to sing mournful lamentations about their houses by night, whenever any of the family labors under a sickness which is to end by death, but no families which are not of an ancient & noble Stock, are believed to be honored with this fairy privilege".

== Keening ==
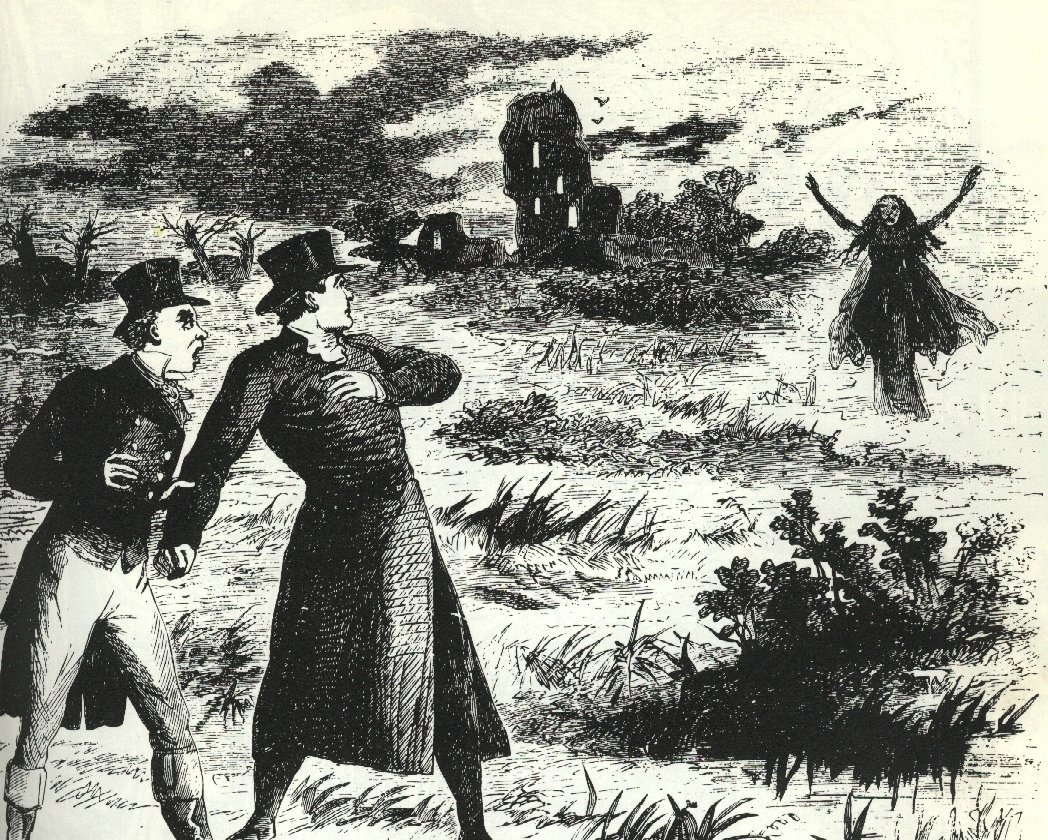
The Banshee Appears, 1862

In Ireland and parts of Scotland, a traditional part of mourning is the keening woman (bean chaointe), who wails a lament —in Irish: caoineadh ('weeping'), pronounced [ˈkɯiːnʲə] in the Irish dialects of Munster and southern County Galway, [ˈkɯiːnʲuː] in Connacht (except south Galway) and (particularly west) Ulster, and [ˈkɯːnʲuw] in Ulster, particularly in the traditional dialects of north and east Ulster, including County Louth. This keening woman may in some cases be a professional, and the best keeners would be in high demand.

Irish legend speaks of a lament being sung by a fairy woman, or banshee. She would sing it when a family member died or was about to die, even if the person had died far away and news of their death had not yet come. In those cases, her wailing would be the first warning the household had of the death. The banshee is also a predictor of death. If someone is about to enter a situation where it is unlikely they will come out alive she will warn people by screaming or wailing, giving rise to a banshee also being known as a wailing woman. The banshee was also associated with the death coach, being said to either summon it with her keening or to travel in tandem with it.

When several banshees appear at once, it indicates the death of someone great or holy. The tales sometimes recounted that the woman, though called a fairy, was a ghost, often of a specific murdered woman, or a mother who died in childbirth.

In some parts of Leinster, she is referred to as the bean chaointe ('keening woman') whose wail can be so piercing that it shatters glass. In Scottish folklore, a similar creature is known as the bean nighe or ban nigheachain ('little washerwoman') or nigheag na h-àth ('little washer at the ford') and is seen washing the bloodstained clothes or armour of those who are about to die. In Welsh folklore, a similar creature is known as the cyhyraeth.

Accounts reach as far back as 1380 to the publication of the Cathreim Thoirdhealbhaigh (Triumphs of Torlough) by Sean mac Craith. Mentions of banshees can also be found in Norman literature of that time.

The low, booming call of a bittern is one possible explanation for the origin of the myth.

== Associated families ==
Some sources suggest that the banshee laments only the descendants of the "pure Milesian stock" of Ireland, with the original belief appearing to associate the folklore with a number of ancient Irish families. According to this tradition, a banshee would not lament or visit someone of Saxon or Norman descent or who came to Ireland later. Most, but not all, surnames associated with banshees have the Ó or Mc/Mac prefix – that is, surnames of Goidelic origin, indicating a family native to the Insular Celtic lands rather than those of the Norse, Anglo-Saxon, or Norman.

There are some exceptions to this lore, including that a banshee may lament a person who had been "gifted with music and song". For example, there are accounts of the Geraldines hearing a banshee – as they had reputedly become "more Irish than the Irish themselves" – and that the Bunworth Banshee, associated with the Rev. Charles Bunworth (a name of Anglo-Saxon origin), heralded the death of an Irish person who had been a patron to musicians.

According to tradition, some families had their own banshee, with the Ua Briain banshee, named Aibell, being the ruler of 25 other banshees who would always be at her attendance.

== See also ==
- Baobhan Sith
- Cailleach
- Caoineag
- Clíodhna
- Devil Bird
- La Llorona
- Klagmuhme
- Madam Koi Koi
- Psychopomp
- Siren
- White Lady (ghost)
