= Ella Carmichael =

Scottish editor and scholar

Elizabeth Watson
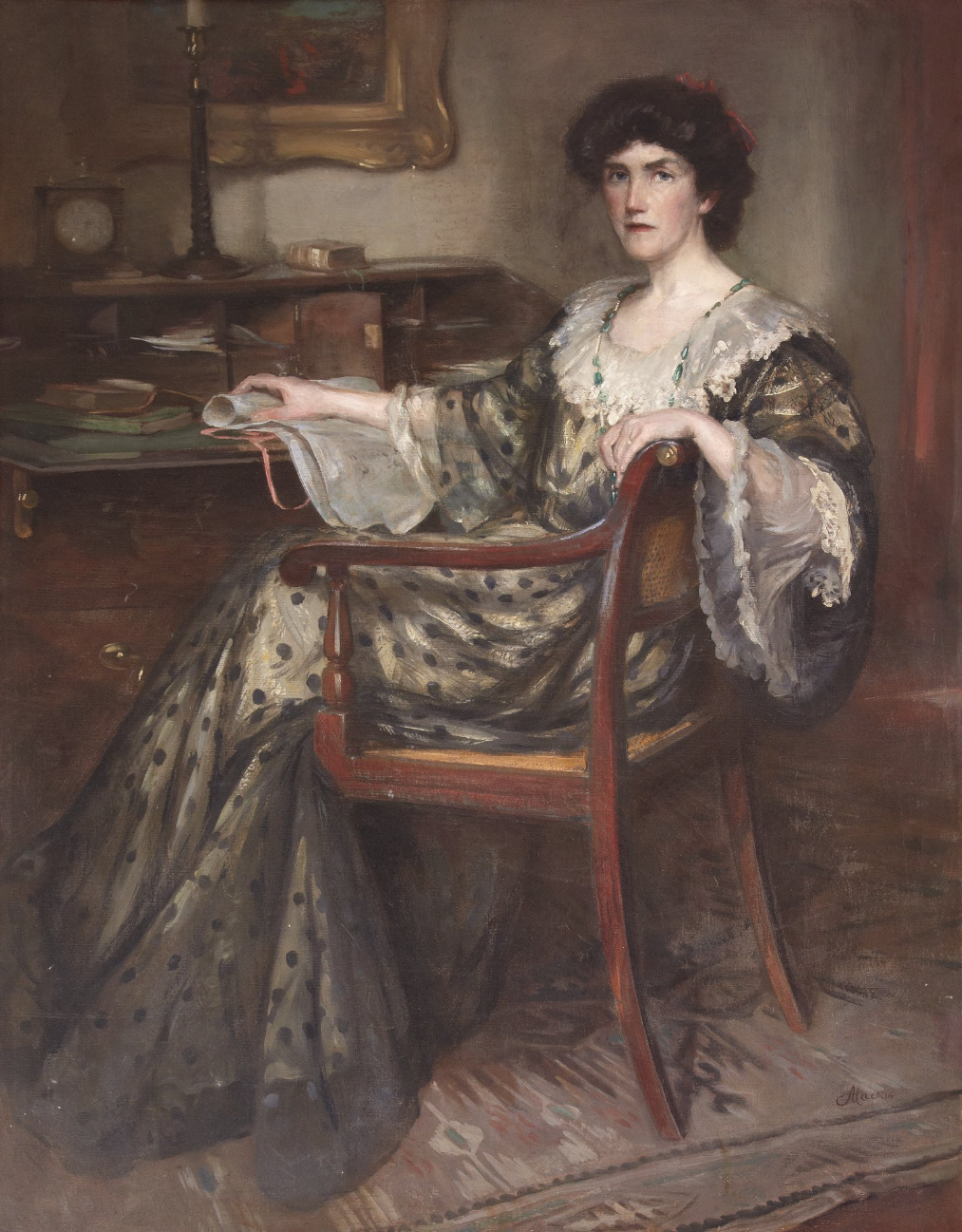
- Ella Carmichael, portrait by C. H. Mackie
- Born: 9 August 1870; Lismore, Scotland
- Died: 30 November 1928 (aged 58); Edinburgh, Scotland
- Known for: Supporting Scottish Gaelic language
- Spouse: William J. Watson
- Children: James Carmichael Watson
- Parent(s): Alexander Carmichael, Mary Carmichael (nee Mary Frances MacBean)

Elizabeth Catherine "Ella" Carmichael (9 August 1870 – 30 November 1928), also known after 1906 as Mrs. W. J. Watson, was a Scottish editor and scholar, remembered as a supporter of the Scottish Gaelic language.

== Early life ==
Carmichael was born 9 August 1870 in Lismore, Scotland, the only daughter of four children born to Alexander Carmichael, an exciseman and author, and Mary Frances MacBean Carmichael. She was raised in the Uists. She was one of the first women undergraduates enrolled at the University of Edinburgh.

== Career ==
Carmichael founded the Celtic Union in 1894, and the Women Students' Celtic Society at the University of Edinburgh, after being barred from joining the all-male University Celtic Society. She helped her father to transcribe and edit the Carmina Gadelica (1900), and later worked on a revised edition of his landmark work. She supported the study and preservation of the Scottish Gaelic language as the acting editor of the Celtic Review from 1904 to 1916. Gaelic scholars consider her the likely model for John Duncan's illustration, Anima Celtica (1895).

In 1904, Carmichael attended the annual meeting of the Caledonian Medical Society, in her role as editor of the Celtic Review. She lectured in Glasgow on "The Evil Eye" in 1906. She also contributed articles to the An Deo-Ghreine magazine; her 1905 essay, "Some Things Women Can Do", begins: "It is no exaggeration to say that, if our women would put their hearts into the Gaelic movement, the future of the language would be assured, and there could be no talk of Gaelic being doomed.

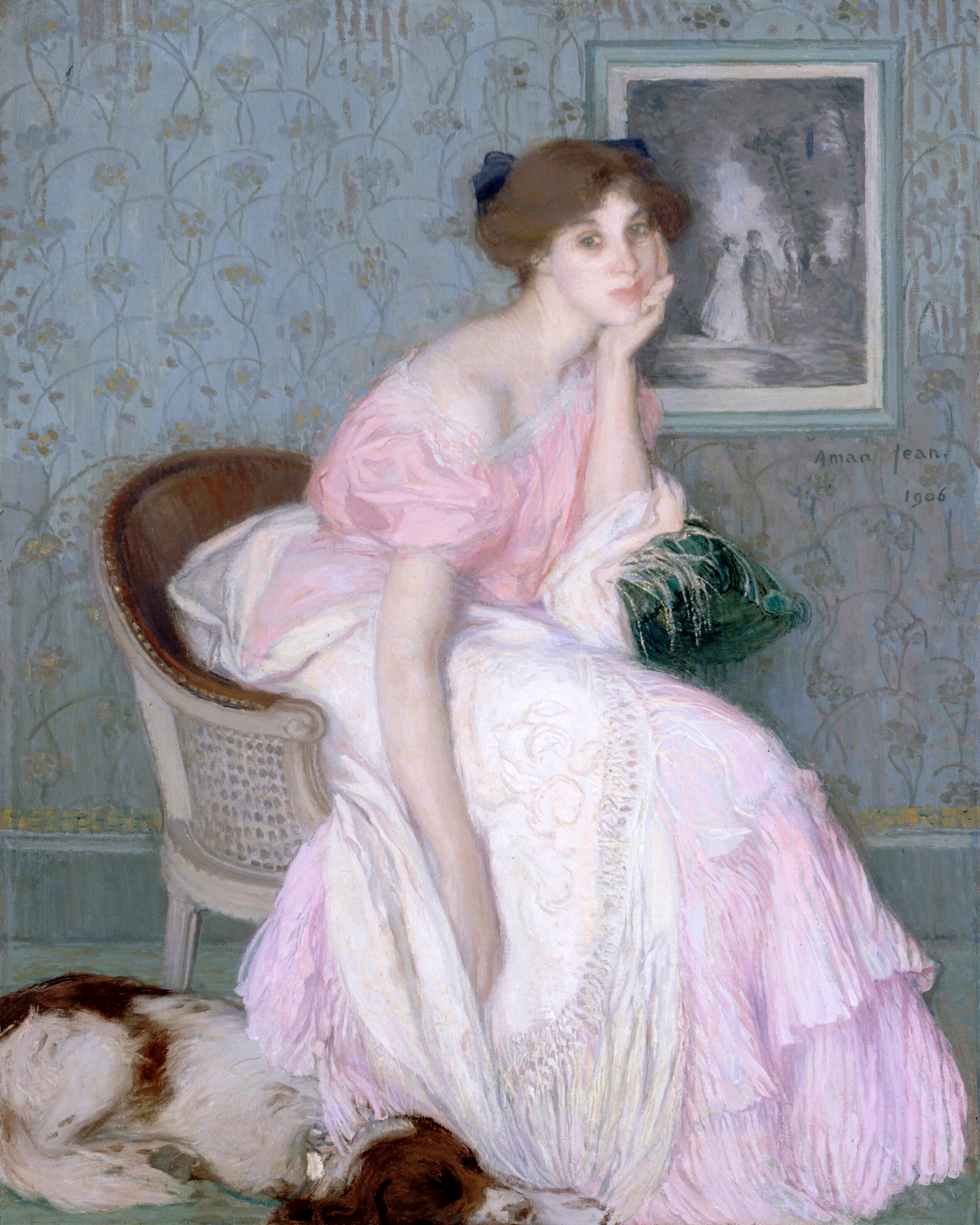
Portrait of Ella Carmichaël by Edmond Aman-Jean

== Personal life ==
Carmichael married William J Watson, a professor of Celtic at the University of Edinburgh, in 1906. They had two sons; the older son died in childhood. Their younger son, James Carmichael Watson, a Celtic scholar who was killed in World War II in 1942. She died 30 November 1928 in Edinburgh, aged 58 years. In 1974, a portrait of Carmichael was presented to the Department of Celtic at the University of Edinburgh, by her nephew, Michael Carmichael.
