= William J. Watson =

Scottish author

Professor William J. Watson FRSE FSA Scot
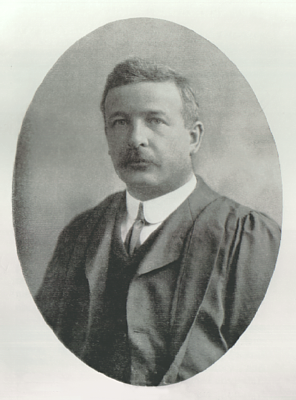

Professor of Celtic Languages, Literature, History and Antiquities, University of Edinburgh
- In office 1914–1938

Personal details
- Born: William John Watson; 17 February 1865 Milntown of New Tarbat, Ross-shire, Scotland
- Died: 9 March 1948 (aged 83)
- Occupation: Toponymist

William John Watson (17 February 1865 – 9 March 1948) was a Scottish toponymist and was the first scholar to place the study of Scottish place names on a firm linguistic basis.

== Life ==
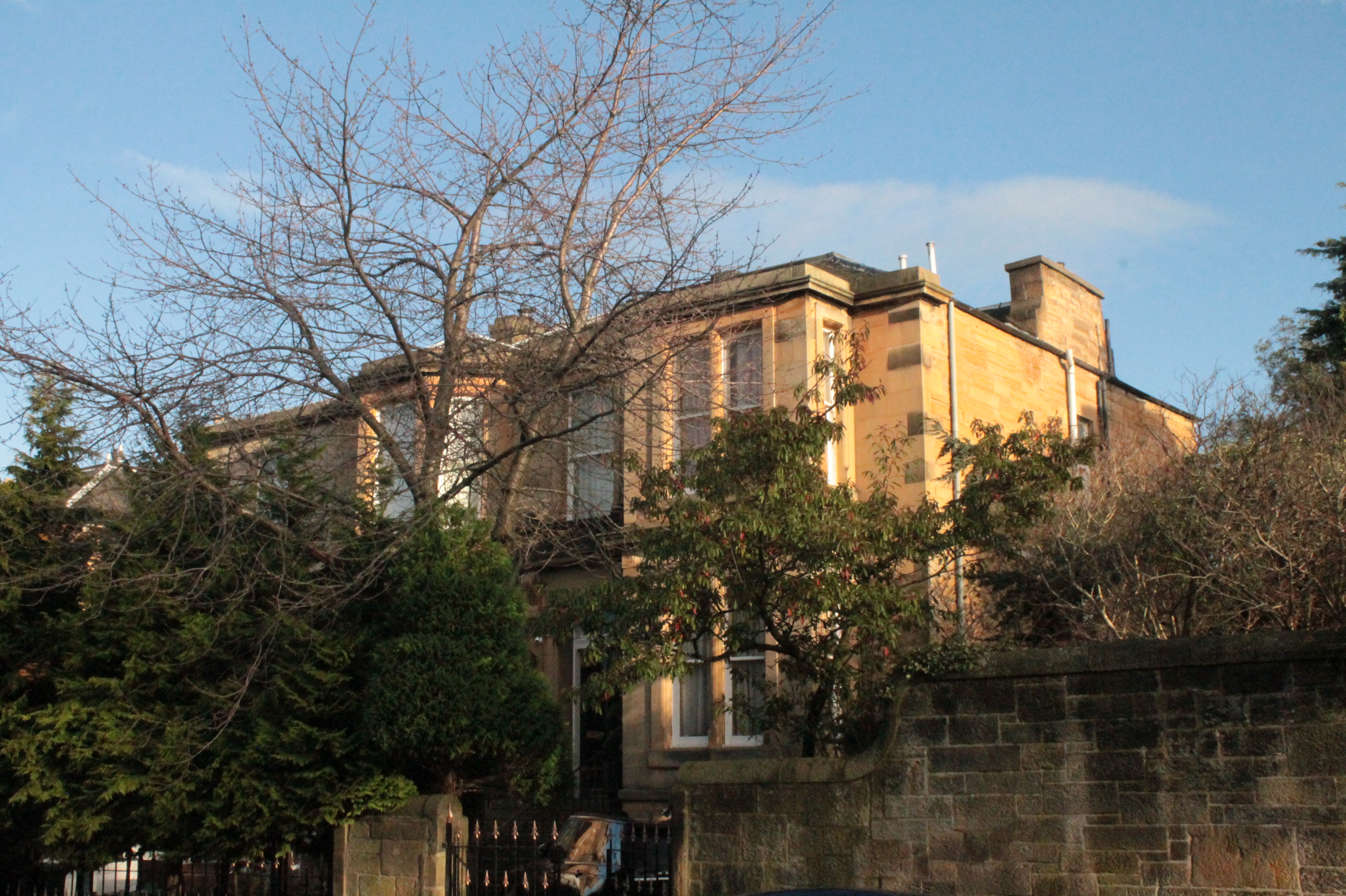
17 Merchiston Avenue, Edinburgh

Watson was a native Gaelic-speaker, born in Milntown of New Tarbat (now known as Milton), Easter Ross. He was the son of Hugh Watson, a blacksmith. He received his initial education from his uncle, James Watson. William became well grounded in Gaelic studies and the Classics. He went to study at the University of Aberdeen and the University of Oxford.

Initially a school teacher in Glasgow, he was appointed Rector of the Inverness Royal Academy in 1894 and he then obtained the prestigious post as Rector of the Royal High School, Edinburgh, in 1909. It was while teaching in Inverness that he began to contribute to the Transactions of the Gaelic Society of Inverness and the Celtic Review.

In Edinburgh he lived at 17 Merchiston Avenue.

In 1910 he was elected a Fellow of the Royal Society of Edinburgh. His proposers were Walter Biggar Blaikie, Sir William Leslie Mackenzie, John Horne and Ben Peach.

He took the chair of Celtic at the University of Edinburgh in 1914, despite holding no prior university position. He remained in this prestigious position until making way for his son James Carmichael Watson in 1935 (but retaining a role in the university until 1938).

William died on 9 March 1948, aged 83.

== Family ==
He married Ella Carmichael (1880–1928), daughter of Alexander Carmichael.

His son, James Carmichael Watson, was born in 1910. He was declared "missing in action" in 1942, when HMS Jaguar was sunk off the coast of Egypt. Presumed drowned, he is memorialised on the Plymouth Naval Memorial.

== Publications ==
He is known for his The Celtic Place-names of Scotland (1926), based on 30 years of work. Watson's work, eight decades later, is still the primary scholarly reference guide on the subject. The book is based on extensive notes taken by Watson, which are unpublished and held by the University of Edinburgh. Watson's great work was recently republished by Birlinn (2004).

- Place-Names of Ross and Cromarty (Inverness, 1904)
- Prints of the Past around Inverness (Inverness, 1909; 2nd revised edition Inverness, 1925)
- Rosg Gàidhlig (Inverness, 1915; 2nd edition Glasgow, 1929)
- Bàrdachd Gàidhlig (Inverness, 1915)
- The Picts: their original position in Scotland (Inverness, 1921)
- Ross and Cromarty. Cambridge County Geographies. 1924.
- The History of the Celtic Place-Names of Scotland (Edinburgh, 1926)
- Scottish Verse in the Book of the Dean of Lismore (Edinburgh, 1937)
