= Les Lavandières =

Three old washerwomen from Celtic mythology

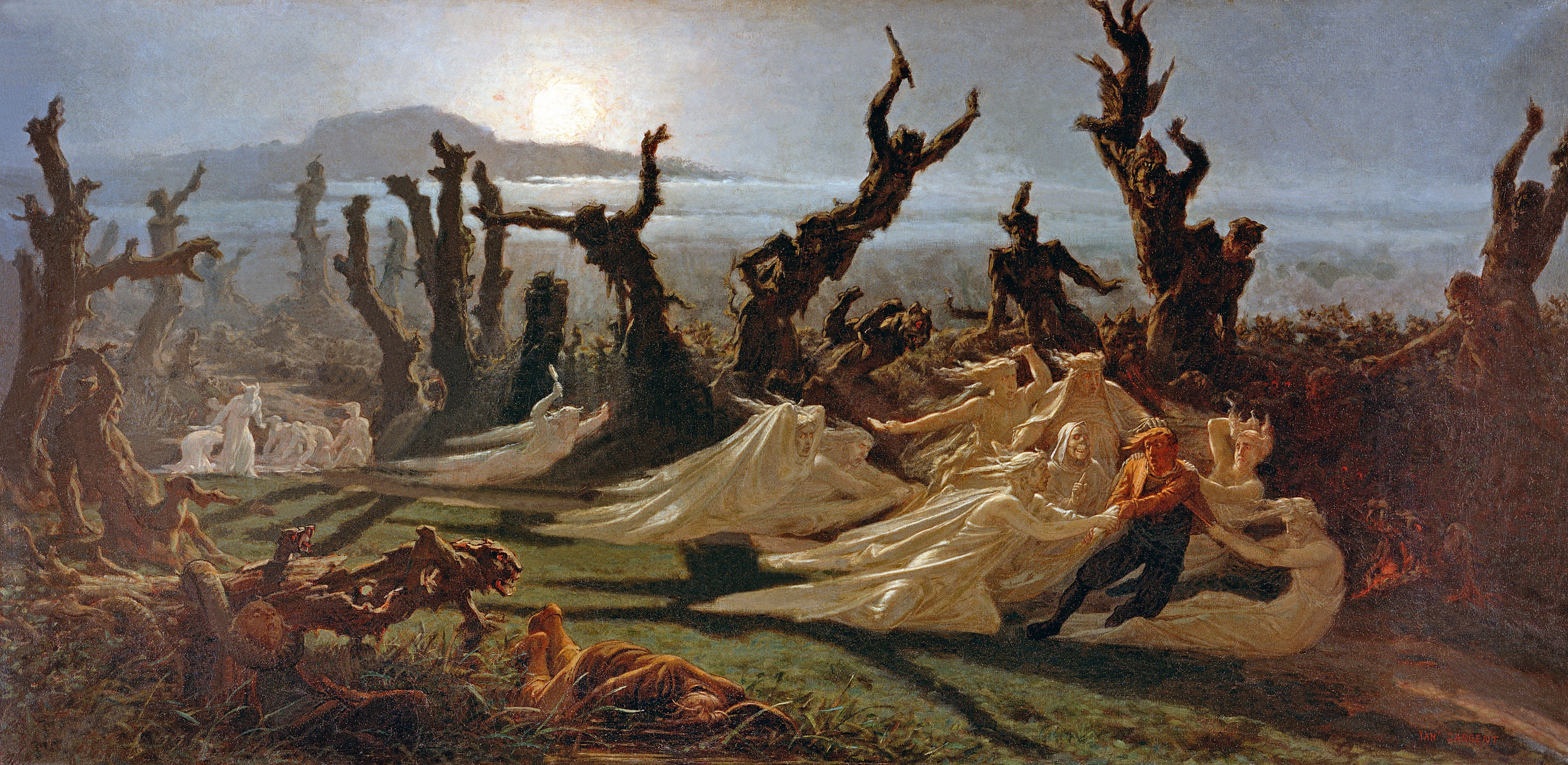
Les Lavandières de la nuit, 1888, Yan' Dargent, oil, 75×150cm

Les Lavandières, or the Midnight Washerwomen, are three old washerwomen in Celtic mythology. Names in various Celtic languages include the kannerezed noz in Brittany and the Bean nighe in Gaelic. They can also be found in the Celtic folklore of Iberia as Las Lavanderas in Cantabria, As lavandeiras in Galicia or Les Llavanderes in Asturias, and in Portugal are known as Bruxas lavadeiras . The three old women go to the water's edge at midnight to wash shrouds for those about to die, according to the myth and folklore of Brittany; or to wash the bloodstained clothing of those who are about to die, according to Celtic mythology. The Midnight Washerwomen may be related to the old Celtic tradition of the triple goddess of death and slaughter.

== France ==
In the nineteenth century, the belief in night washerwomen was very present in Brittany and Normandy, but it is also attested in many other regions of France: Berry, Pyrenees, Alps, Alsace, Morvan, Creuse, Burgundy and Ariège.

An important number of Romantic French authors and poets wrote about the lavandières, from Guy de Maupassant and Victor Hugo to George Sand.

=== Brittany ===
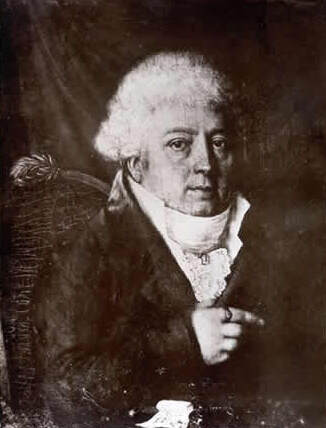
Portrait of Breton author Jacques Cambry (1749-1807).

In Brittany, legends of the lavandière de la nuit were attested by Jacques Cambry as early as the 18th century.

In Brittany, they can be an ominous portent, foretelling death, either one's own or a death in the family, though it is rare, just like they are not always represented as old women, though they always have very pale skin, being creatures of the night, and are often dressed in white or in traditional clothing. They are very agile and strong physically, even when they do not look so.

The Breton washerwomen wash graveclothes, usually at night, under the moonlight, and are notable for their intense dislike of being disturbed, cursing those who dare to do so. They are known to ask passers-by for help in wringing clothes, breaking the arms of those who do so reluctantly and drowning those who refuse. More rarely, they can also give charity.

According to the Breton legends, the washerwomen can either be ghosts whose name is known to all or else they are anonymous supernatural beings who appear in a human form. It is encountered during the year in the evening or in the middle of the night in known places (laundrette, creek), sometimes during the nights of full moon, sometimes only on the eve of the feast of the dead (All Saints' Day).

Numerous folk tales on the subject have been collected during the 19th and 20th century. In Breton, the washerwomen are collectively known as ar c’hannerezed-noz, ar c’houerezed-noz or ar vaouez o welc’hin. The late written tales we have of the Lavendières do not allow us to know with certainty if they have the same mythological origin as the bean nighe.

According to a Breton tradition, they are deceased who were buried in a dirty shroud:

Breton

Quen na zui kristen salver
Rede goëlc'hi hou licer
Didan an earc'h ag an aër.

English

Until a christian saviour comes
We must whiten our shroud
Under the snow and the wind.

== Scotland ==
In Scotland, if one can get between the washerwomen and the water, they are required to grant three wishes in exchange for three questions answered truthfully. There is also a tradition in Scotland of a single washer at the ford, the goddess Clotha, who gives the River Clyde its name.

== Wales and Cornwall ==
In Wales and Cornwall a passerby must avoid being seen by the washerwomen. If they do get seen however, they are required to help wring out the sheets. If they twist the sheets in the same direction as the washerwomen, the individual's arms will be wrenched from their sockets and they will get pulled into the wet sheets and killed instantly. If, however, they twist in the opposite direction, the washerwomen are required to grant the person three wishes.

== See also ==
- Three Witches in Macbeth
- ancient classical myths of the Fates: the Greek Moirai and the Roman Parcae
