= TD Cruze =

- Born: 1992 (age 33–34)
- Origin: Valdosta, Georgia, United States
- Genres: Instrumental hip hop, Experimental hip hop, alternative hip hop
- Occupation: Producer
- Years active: 2010–Present

TD Cruze is an American multi-instrumentalist and producer. He began making music in 2010, and in 2012 he produced "Tell You This", a single from rapper Lil B. His debut EP, "The Savage Beast" was released in December 2012, and was created using only animal noises. The EP received widespread recognition on music blogs and even appeared on CBC Radio-Canada.

Cruze then went on to release more instrumental EPs and produce more songs for Lil B and other rappers.

== Discography ==
=== EPs ===
- The Savage Beast (2012)
- Sight and Sound (2012)
- Irish Eyes (2013)
- TDTV (2013)
- Pavlov's Dogs (2013)
- Nice Find (2013)
- The Last P90Xorcism (2013)
- The Savage Beast 2 (2013)
- TDTV 2 (2014)
- Mothra (2014)
- Mr. Sorry (2014)
- Hades (2014)
- Holy Tony Hawk On A Hoverboard (2015)
- The Weather Channel (2015)
- A Little Less Human Than Us Humans (2015)
- Holy Tony Hawk On A Hoverboard 2 (2015)
- Nothing More To Say (2015)
- Milano Collection TD (2019)
- Posthumous Collection Volume 1 (2019)
- Posthumous Collection Volume 2 (2019)

=== Productions ===
- Lil B - "Tell You This"
- Lil B - "Pink Flame"
- Lil B - "Hip Hop 101"
- Lil B - "I Dont Hate You"
- Lil B - "Im Solid"
- Lil B - "Love B"
- Lil B - "Marbel Floors And Pain"
- Michael Myerz - "Algae"
- Michael Myerz - "Be Realistic"
- Wapper - "Luck X Red"
- Wapper - "Magic Seeds"
- Wapper - "Chilli Zilli"
- Wapper - "The Answer"
