= Slattenpatte =

Danish mythical creature

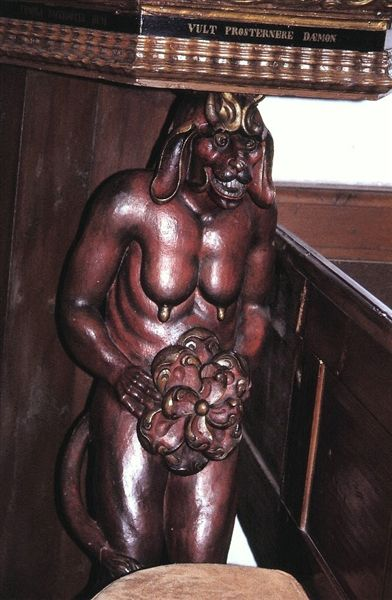
Woodcarving of Slattenpatten from 1668 in Vejlø church, Denmark. Artist: Abel Schrøder

Slattenpatten or slattenlangpat (literally “flaccid-breasts” or “saggy-long-breast”, is a female creature in Danish folklore.

The beast is also referred to as an “ellekone” (elf-woman), but unlike an “ellepige” (elf-girls or wood nymphs), which are generally described as very beautiful, Slattenpatten is characterized by having extremely long breasts. Similar to the dangerous "ellepiger" who stole the souls of men by way of their sheer beauty, "slattenlangpat" also was a haunting woman. The legend goes that Kong Volmer chased and shot her every night, only to see her return the next morning

The breasts hang "all the way to the knee area", and they can be thrown over the shoulder so a child can feed, even if it's carried on her back. In situations where Slattenpatten is chased, she simply throws her breasts over her shoulders so they are not in the way when she has to run

The legendary figure slattenlangpat is supposed to have symbolized fertility, her long breasts bearing evidence to all the children she had given birth to and nourished. Another legend tells us that her breasts were so long so that she could breastfeed her fish-children under the water. Slattenlangpat is therefore also associated with water and considered a water goddess, in particular according to certain archaeologists, in the Danish region of Zealand.
