= Alexander Carmichael =

Scottish exciseman, folklorist, antiquarian and author

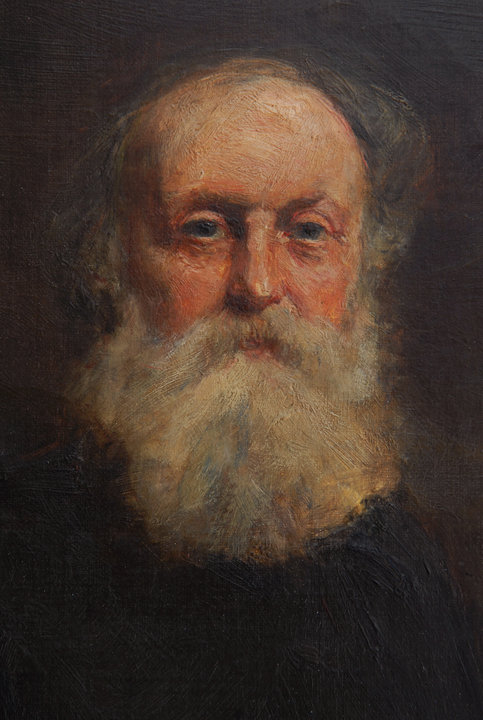
Alexander Carmichael

Alexander Carmichael (full name Alexander Archibald Carmichael or Alasdair Gilleasbaig MacGilleMhìcheil in his native Scottish Gaelic; 1 December 1832, Taylochan, Isle of Lismore – 6 June 1912, Barnton, Edinburgh) was a Scottish exciseman, folklorist, antiquarian, and author. Between 1860 and his death Carmichael collected a vast amount of folklore, local traditions, natural history observations, antiquarian data, and material objects from people throughout the Scottish Highlands, particularly in the southern Outer Hebrides where he lived, worked, and brought up his family between 1864 and 1882. Alexander Carmichael is best known today for Carmina Gadelica, an influential but controversial compendium of edited Highland lore and literature published in six volumes between 1900 and 1971.

== Career ==
The material that Carmichael collected in the Carmina Gadelica - "The Hymns of the Gael" - is noted for its preservation of an indigenous "Celtic" spirituality that integrates the Christian with aspects of the pre-Christian. While Carmichael does provide a little material from Lewis and Harris, most comes from the southern isles, especially South Uist, where a Catholic tradition had permitted the preservation of what, in the Protestant north, would usually have been dismissed in relatively modern times as "superstitions". The southern isles might have been more open to "nature religion" than other Catholic regions because, after the Reformation, they were re-evangelisd by Franciscan missionaries, open to nature spirituality. To what extent scholarship into Carmichael has been shaped over the past century by differences between Catholic and Protestant perceptions of Hebridean tradition is a question that has been asked privately by some scholars, but thus far not researched.

In his 1992 preface to the Floris single volume edition (abridged and without the Gaelic original) John MacInnes of the School of Scottish Studies concludes by quoting his University of Edinburgh ethnographer colleague, Ronald Black (Raghnall MacilleDhuibh), as surmising: "Carmina Gadelica is by any standards a treasure house ... a marvellous and unrepeatable achievement. There will never be another Carmina Gadelica." Amongst other points, MacInnes's preface explores the extent to which Carmichael might have embellished some of his material.

At least the first two volumes, the original published volumes (out of an eventual four) of the Carmina are now available as online searchable scans - links can be found at Carmina Gadelica. Also important is Carmichael's two written testimonies to the Napier Commission of 1883 into the condition of Scottish crofters. All five volumes of Napier have now been scanned and placed online by Lochaber College, and an extract PDF, containing just the Carmichael material with its ethnographic account, is available online. In the Napier material that in some of the "old hymns" cited, Carmichael specifies "close translation", and not so with others. A folklorist with an approach to living tradition such as that of the late Hamish Henderson (also of the University of Edinburgh) on seeing such specification might have surmised that in some cases, where "close translation" was not specified, Carmichael allowed himself to enter into the tradition by allowing it to flow via his own interpretation of what he heard ... and that as an indigenous West Highland himself (from Lismore) this could be considered as being eminently appropriate - depending on how one views the rigidity or fluidity of a folk tradition..His personal collection of artefacts was gifted by his family to The West Highland Museum where it is on display.

== Personal life ==
He was an exciseman and in the course of his travels was able to collect extensive folklore. In the Napier submissions he mentions that he had often turned down promotion in order to continue as an excise man in a location that allowed his major work to be seen through. His daughter Ella who continued to publish his work after his death was married to Scottish Gaelic scholar William J. Watson.

== Works ==
- Carmina Gadelica, 1900
- Popular Tales of the West Highlands, 1862
- Deirdire and the Lay of the Children of Uisne, 1905, Edinburgh: Norman MacLeod Publishers
