= Carmina Gadelica =

Anthology by Alexander Carmichael

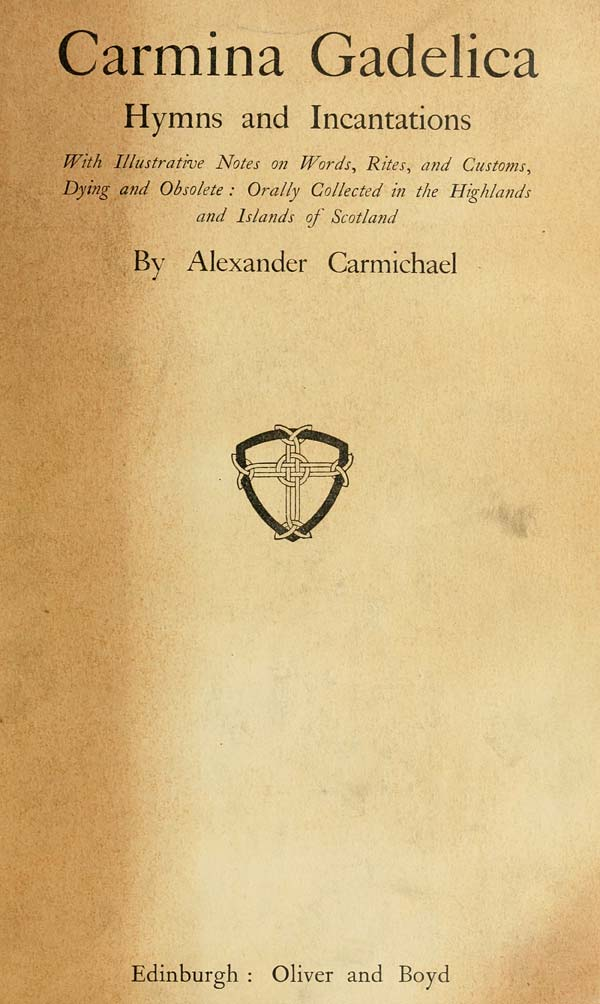
Title page of volume 3

Carmina Gadelica, also known as Charms of the Gaels, is a compendium of prayers, hymns, charms, incantations, blessings, literary-folkloric poems and songs, proverbs, lexical items, historical anecdotes, natural history observations, and miscellaneous lore gathered in the Gàidhealtachd regions of Scotland between 1860 and 1909. The material was recorded, translated, and reworked by the exciseman and folklorist Alexander Carmichael (1832–1912).

== Authors and publication ==
Carmina Gadelica was published in six volumes: Alexander Carmichael himself, with the assistance of family and friends, was responsible for the first two volumes, published in 1900; these were re-edited by his daughter Ella (1870–1928) in 1928. Although Carmichael's correspondence suggests that he planned at least one further volume in the series, he was unable to bring this plan to fruition. Further selections from Carmichael's manuscripts were edited by his grandson James Carmichael Watson (1910–1942) and published as volumes III (1940) and IV (1941). A fifth volume, mostly taken up with song texts, was edited by Professor Angus Matheson (1912–1962) in 1954. The series was rounded off in 1971 with a sixth volume containing a lengthy glossary and indices, edited by Angus Matheson with the assistance of his brother William (1910–1995). In 1992 Floris Press published a one-volume English-language edition with a valuable introduction by Dr John MacInnes (b. 1930). Floris Press reprinted the entire six-volume series in 2006.

== Origins of the collection ==
The origins of the Carmina Gadelica can be traced to ‘Grazing and Agrestic Customs of the Outer Hebrides’, the second appendix Alexander Carmichael contributed to the Report of the Napier Commission in 1884. Francis Napier, 10th Lord Napier, had requested Carmichael to compose a piece on traditional Hebridean land customs based on the chapter on the subject that he had written for the third volume of William Forbes Skene’s Celtic Scotland. Carmichael rounded off his contribution in an unorthodox manner, presenting a selection of traditional rhymes, prayers, blessings, and songs he had gathered from a wide variety of informants in the islands, intended to illustrate the spiritual refinement and respectability of their crofter reciters. The popularity of ‘Grazing and Agrestic Customs’, and a subsequent paper Carmichael delivered on 24 December 1888 to the Gaelic Society of Glasgow on ‘Uist Old Hymns’, encouraged him to embark upon a much more comprehensive work on the subject.

== Publishers ==
The collection was first offered, in 1891, to the Clarendon Press as Idylls of the Isles, then subsequently to Archibald Sinclair's Gaelic publishing company in Glasgow. In both cases, the offer was withdrawn owing to Carmichael's unhappiness with the publisher's plans, and his determination to see the collection through the press on his own terms and according to his own design. Much of the final editing was carried out after Carmichael's retirement from the Inland Revenue in December 1897, with the help of a team of assistants including his daughter Ella Carmichael and his protégés George Henderson (1866–1912), who gave the work its title, and Kenneth MacLeod (1871–1955). The initial letters, adapted from early medieval insular manuscripts and engraved stones, were illustrated by Carmichael's wife Mary Frances Macbean (1838–1928). The book itself, dedicated to Mary Frances, was published in two volumes in October 1900, under the auspices of Walter Biggar Blaikie (1847–1928) in a limited edition of 300 copies, costing 3 guineas a copy. Carmina Gadelica was a landmark in Scottish art publishing, intended not just as a treasury of lore, but as an object of beauty in itself.

== Reviews ==
The first two volumes of Carmina Gadelica were initially welcomed by reviewers as a monumental achievement in folklore, as well as a lasting testament to their creator: the ‘splendid consummation of the love-labour of a whole diligent life-time’. Although little public criticism was voiced during Carmichael's lifetime, it is clear that other Gaelic folklore collectors and scholars such as Father Allan McDonald, the Rev. John Gregorson Campbell, and Alexander Macbain were uneasy with his earlier treatment of material he had collected. Eventually, Carmichael's editing methods were roundly challenged in 1976 with the publication of Hamish Robertson's article in Scottish Gaelic Studies, "Studies in Carmichael's Carmina Gadelica". Having searched for manuscript copies of charms appearing in the third and fourth volumes, Robertson accused Carmichael of meddling with, altering, and polishing original texts: 'hardly one had not been touched up in some way, sometimes quite drastically'. Robertson's article drew a vigorous rebuff from the Gaelic scholar John Lorne Campbell in the following issue of the journal, although Campbell conceded that '[m]uch of the first three volumes of the Carmina must be taken as a literary and not as a literal presentation of Gaelic folklore'. Now that Alexander Carmichael's original field notebooks, accompanied by full transcriptions, have been published online under the auspices of the Carmichael Watson Project at the Centre for Research Collections, University of Edinburgh, for the first time the editing processes involved in the creation of Carmina Gadelica can properly be assessed.

== Legacy ==
Although Carmina Gadelica remains a controversial text, its volumes have to be read in the context of Carmichael's own times, a period of widespread political strife in the Highlands, when habitual contempt of Gaels, their language and their culture was widespread and publicly expressed. In the words of Gaelic scholar Dr John MacInnes, 'Carmina Gadelica is not a monumental exercise in literary fabrication nor, on the other hand, is it a transcript of ancient poems and spells reproduced exactly in the form in which they survived in oral tradition.' Despite its flaws, Carmina Gadelica remains an indispensable source for the popular culture, customs, beliefs, and way of life of Scottish Gaels in the nineteenth century.
