= List of listed buildings in Barra =

This is a list of listed buildings in the parish of Barra in the Outer Hebrides, Scotland.

== List ==
Name	Location	Date Listed	Grid Ref. (Note: Sometimes known as OSGB36, the grid reference (where provided) is based on the British national grid reference system used by the Ordnance Survey. • "Guide to National Grid". Ordnance Survey. • "Get-a-map". Ordnance Survey.)	Geo-coordinates	Notes	LB Number (Note: Historic Environment Scotland assign a unique alphanumeric identifier to each designated site in Scotland, for listed buildings this always begins with "LB", for example "LB12345".)	Image
Barra, Former Castlebay Primary School, Including Schoolhouse, Gates, Gatepiers And Boundary Walls				56°57′21″N 7°29′21″W	Category C(S)	46331	Upload Photo
Barra Head Lighthouse, Keeper's House, Graveyard, Ancillary Structures, Garden And Boundary Walls				56°47′08″N 7°39′12″W	Category A	5893	Upload another image
Vatersay Annie Jane Monument				56°55′32″N 7°32′26″W	Category C(S)	5902	Upload Photo
Suidheachan				57°01′22″N 7°27′03″W	Category B	5903	Upload Photo
Barra Parish Church And Churchyard				57°00′05″N 7°29′08″W	Category C(S)	5894	Upload Photo
Castlebay Church Of Our Lady Star Of The Sea And Presbytery				56°57′19″N 7°29′05″W	Category B	5896	Upload another image
123 Borve Gariemore				56°59′03″N 7°30′05″W	Category C(S)	5895	Upload Photo
Cuier Former Manse				57°00′11″N 7°29′23″W	Category B	5899	Upload Photo
87 Horogh				56°57′11″N 7°29′52″W	Category C(S)	5900	Upload Photo
Castlebay The Square House At North West				56°57′19″N 7°29′10″W	Category B	5897	Upload Photo
Craigstone St Brendan's Rc Church				56°59′10″N 7°30′19″W	Category C(S)	5898	Upload Photo
Kisimul Castle				56°57′07″N 7°29′15″W	Category A	5901	Upload another image

== Key ==
The scheme for classifying buildings in Scotland is:

- Category A: "buildings of national or international importance, either architectural or historic; or fine, little-altered examples of some particular period, style or building type."
- Category B: "buildings of regional or more than local importance; or major examples of some particular period, style or building type, which may have been altered."
- Category C: "buildings of local importance; lesser examples of any period, style, or building type, as originally constructed or moderately altered; and simple traditional buildings which group well with other listed buildings."

In March 2016 there were 47,288 listed buildings in Scotland. Of these, 8% were Category A, and 50% were Category B, with the remaining 42% being Category C.

== See also ==
- List of listed buildings in the Outer Hebrides
