= Lochmaddy Sheriff Court =

Judicial building in Lochmaddy, Scotland

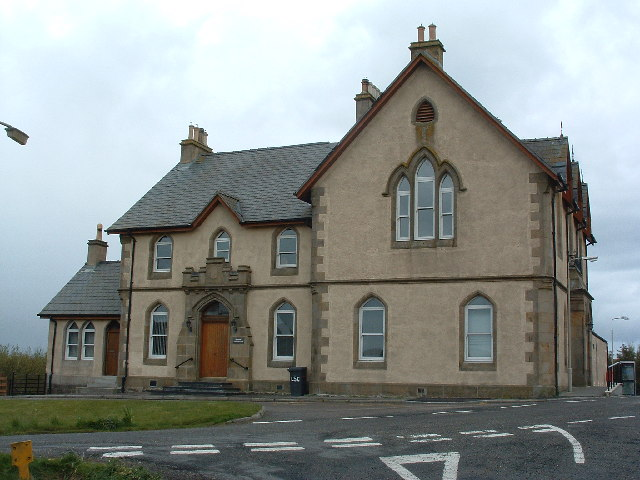
- The building in 2005

- Shown in the Outer Hebrides
- 57.6044°N 7.1622°W
- Location: Lochmaddy

History
- Built: 1875

Site notes
- Architect(s): James Matthews and William Lawrie
- Architectural style: Gothic Revival style

Listed Building – Category C(S)
- Official name: Lochmaddy Sheriff Court, Lochmaddy, North Uist
- Designated: 24 April 1985
- Reference no.: LB17575

Lochmaddy Sheriff Court, also known as County Buildings, is a judicial building in Lochmaddy in Scotland. The building, which continues to be used as a courthouse, is a Category C listed building.

== History ==
An early courthouse was established in the village in 1827, and was adapted, to a design by James Ross, to serve as a prison, with a courtroom, in 1845. The design involved a symmetrical main frontage of three bays facing northeast. It was fenestrated by a single sash window flanked by lancet windows on the ground floor, and by three sash windows on the first floor with a gable above. There were porches with round-headed doorways on either side of the main structure, one leading to the courtroom, and the other leading to four vaulted prison cells.

In the early 1870s, court officials decided to commission a dedicated courthouse for the area. The site they selected was in the northeast part of the village close to the prison. The new building was designed by James Matthews and William Lawrie in the Gothic Revival style, built in rubble masonry and was completed in 1875. The design involved an asymmetrical main frontage of three bays facing northeast. The central bay featured a porch containing an arched doorway with a hood mould surmounted by a small stone mansard roof with brattishing. The building was fenestrated by two pairs of arched windows on the ground floor, and by three arched windows with dormer roofs and finials on the first floor. The southeast elevation incorporated a lower three storey block in a similar style with a small single storey section beyond. Internally, the principal room was the courtroom, which featured a long sheriff's bench, a dock and pew-type public seating.

The new building was extended to the northwest, to a design by Alexander Ross and Robert John McBeth, to create a long single storey prison wing, in 1892. The old courthouse ceased operating as a prison at that time, and was converted to serve as the local offices of the Scottish Home Industries Association in 1900, before being adapted for residential use.

In the late 19th century, the sheriff was unable to sentence offenders to prison because of impurities in the water, which the proprietor of North Uist, Sir John William Powlett Campbell-Orde, 3rd Baronet, had refused to rectify and which had led to prisoners and residents alike succumbing to typhoid fever and other diseases.

On 26 April 1941, the court was the venue for the trial of four men accused of unloading whisky and barrels of oil from the cargo ship, SS Politician, which had run aground off the coast of the island of Eriskay in 1941. Her cargo included 28,000 cases of scotch whisky. The four men were found guilty and fined, in a case which formed the basis for the novel, Whisky Galore, written by Compton Mackenzie and published in 1947.

An extensive programme of refurbishment works, involving the application of a cement render to the external walls, was completed in the 1990s. The building continues to serve as the venue for sheriff court hearings in the area, although, due to staffing issues with the escort services, hearings involving juries were moved to the mainland in July 2023.

== See also ==
- List of listed buildings in North Uist
