= List of listed buildings in Lochs, Western Isles =

This is a list of listed buildings in the parish of Lochs in the Outer Hebrides, Scotland.

== List ==
Name	Location	Date Listed	Grid Ref. (Note: Sometimes known as OSGB36, the grid reference (where provided) is based on the British national grid reference system used by the Ordnance Survey. • "Guide to National Grid". Ordnance Survey. • "Get-a-map". Ordnance Survey.)	Geo-coordinates	Notes	LB Number (Note: Historic Environment Scotland assign a unique alphanumeric identifier to each designated site in Scotland, for listed buildings this always begins with "LB", for example "LB12345".)	Image
Arnish Lighthouse and Attendant Buildings				58°11′28″N 6°22′17″W	Category B	13328	Upload another image See more images
Lacasaidh, Church At NGR NB 322 220				58°06′22″N 6°32′50″W	Category C(S)	13333	Upload another image
Gravir, Church At NGR NB 3747 1573				58°03′10″N 6°27′05″W	Category C(S)	13331	Upload another image
Acha Mor School Including Playground Walls				58°10′20″N 6°34′47″W	Category B	13327	Upload Photo
Leurbost, Church At NGR NB 3825 2558				58°08′29″N 6°26′56″W	Category C(S)	13334	Upload another image
Marvig, School and Schoolhouse				58°05′08″N 6°23′22″W	Category B	13335	Upload another image
Gravir, Former School and Schoolhouse Including Playground Walls				58°02′54″N 6°26′19″W	Category B	13332	Upload another image
Arnish, Monument				58°11′01″N 6°22′53″W	Category C(S)	13329	Upload Photo
Crosbost, Free Church				58°07′57″N 6°26′23″W	Category B	13330	Upload another image

== Key ==
The scheme for classifying buildings in Scotland is:

- Category A: "buildings of national or international importance, either architectural or historic; or fine, little-altered examples of some particular period, style or building type."
- Category B: "buildings of regional or more than local importance; or major examples of some particular period, style or building type, which may have been altered."
- Category C: "buildings of local importance; lesser examples of any period, style, or building type, as originally constructed or moderately altered; and simple traditional buildings which group well with other listed buildings."

In March 2016 there were 47,288 listed buildings in Scotland. Of these, 8% were Category A, and 50% were Category B, with the remaining 42% being Category C.

== See also ==
- List of listed buildings in the Outer Hebrides
