= St Michael's Church, Eriskay =

Roman Catholic Church on South Uist

St Michael's Church
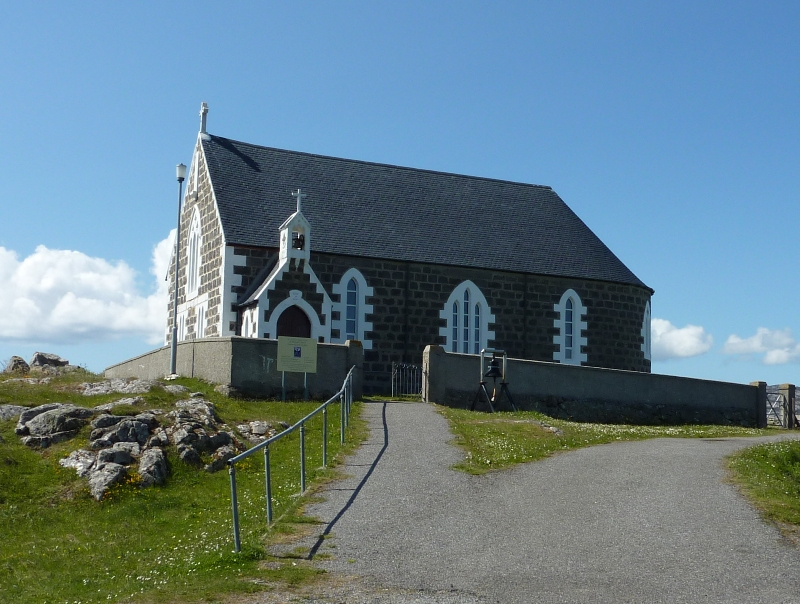
- The church's south-facing main entrance, 2009
- St Michael's Church
- 57°05′14″N 7°18′24″W
- Denomination: Roman Catholic

Architecture
- Architectural type: Gothic
- Completed: 1903; 123 years ago

St Michael's Church (also known as St Michael's of the Sea) is a Category C listed building in Eriskay, South Uist, Scotland. Of Roman Catholic denomination and built on the initiative of iconic poet and folklorist Fr. Allan MacDonald (1859-1905), who remains of the most important figures in modern Scottish Gaelic literature, the church dates from 1903.

== Exterior ==
The church is a plain Gothic apsidal church with an adjoining presbytery. It stands on a hill overlooking the village from the north. It is built of coursed square rubble, with contrasting painted margins and long and short dressings. The porch at the south end of the east wall has a pointed doorway and a corbelled apex belfry. It has a cross finial, and its roof is made of slate.

== Interior ==
Inside there is a triple-arched chancel screen. The altar is supported on a boat's bow, with a ship's lamp on a nearby column. The stone font in the porch may be from an earlier building. The iron bell to the northeast, on an iron frame, is from the SMS Derfflinger. It was recovered from Scapa Flow.

== Gallery ==
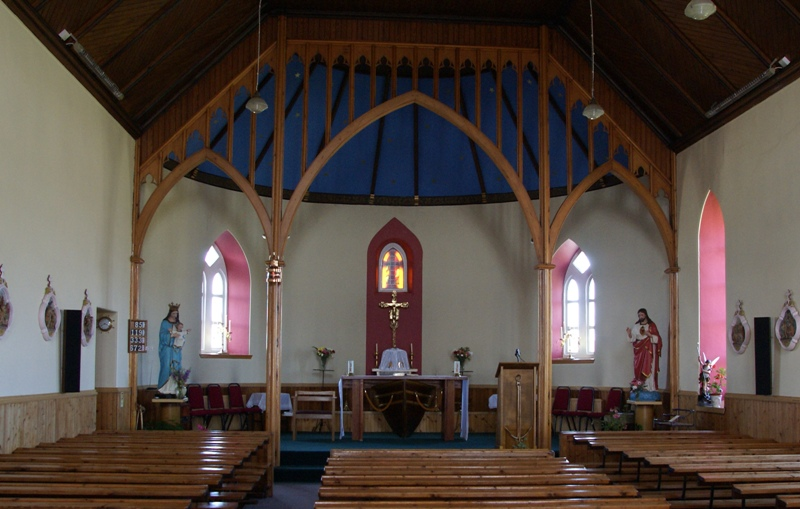
Interior

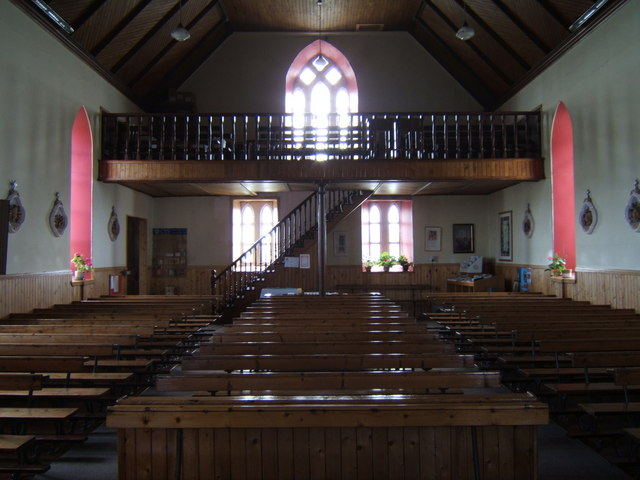
Interior

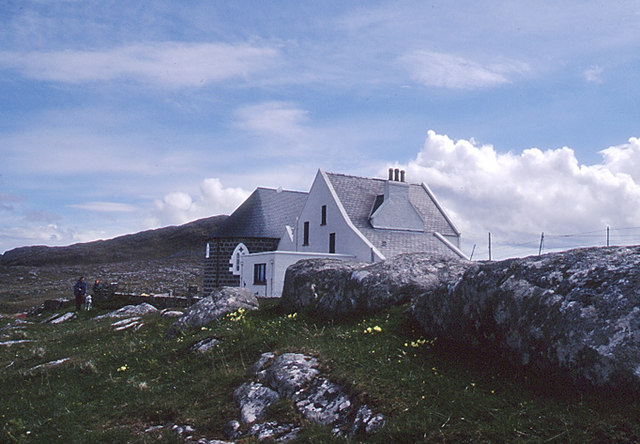
Presbytery

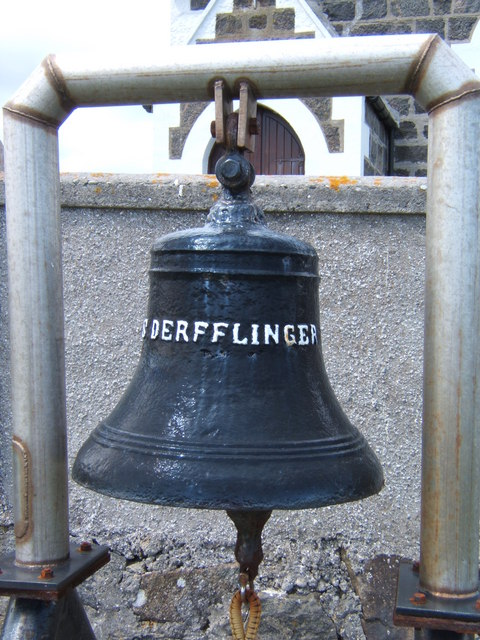
Bell, recovered from the SMS Derfflinger

== See also ==
- List of listed buildings in South Uist
