= List of listed buildings in Uig, Lewis =

This is a list of listed buildings in the parish of Uig in the Outer Hebrides, Scotland.

== List ==
Name	Location	Date Listed	Grid Ref. (Note: Sometimes known as OSGB36, the grid reference (where provided) is based on the British national grid reference system used by the Ordnance Survey. • "Guide to National Grid". Ordnance Survey. • "Get-a-map". Ordnance Survey.)	Geo-coordinates	Notes	LB Number (Note: Historic Environment Scotland assign a unique alphanumeric identifier to each designated site in Scotland, for listed buildings this always begins with "LB", for example "LB12345".)	Image
Garrynahine Lodge				58°11′13″N 6°42′07″W	Category B	19266	Upload Photo
Miavaig Bridge				58°12′12″N 6°57′54″W	Category B	19270	Upload Photo
Doune Carloway, Clapper Bridge				58°15′59″N 6°48′02″W	Category B	18660	Upload Photo
Church Of Scotland At Miavaig, Uig				58°12′19″N 6°57′39″W	Category C(S)	18670	Upload Photo
Loch Croistean Centre				58°10′04″N 6°54′44″W	Category B	19269	Upload Photo
Former Uig Manse Including Glebe/Garden Walls				58°11′42″N 7°01′33″W	Category C(S)	19273	Upload Photo
Breasclate, Lighthouse Keeper's Houses Including Walls Gatepiers And Sundial				58°13′06″N 6°44′45″W	Category B	18655	Upload Photo
Eilean Mor, Flannan Isles Lighthouse Including Former Keeper's House, Boundary Walls And Gatepiers				58°17′17″N 7°35′17″W	Category B	48143	Upload Photo
Uig Lodge And Outbuildings				58°11′21″N 7°00′49″W	Category B	19274	Upload Photo
Grimersta, Kennels				58°10′21″N 6°44′13″W	Category B	19267	Upload Photo
House At Linishader				58°11′16″N 6°44′51″W	Category C(S)	19268	Upload Photo
Callanish, Tearoom				58°11′56″N 6°44′42″W	Category B	18656	Upload Photo
Beehive Shielings, In Morsgail Forest				58°04′33″N 6°52′02″W	Category B	18654	Upload Photo
Garenin Cottages And Outbuildings Within Area Defined By Ngr Nb 1920 4418/1920 4430/1936 4418/1136 4430				58°17′47″N 6°47′21″W	Category B	19265	Upload another image
Free Carloway Church				58°16′55″N 6°46′07″W	Category B	18657	Upload Photo
Doune Carloway, House Shell Below Broch				58°16′10″N 6°47′36″W	Category C(S)	18659	Upload another image
11 Reef				58°12′21″N 6°55′13″W	Category C(S)	19271	Upload Photo
Uig, Uig Parish Church At Baile Na Cille Including Boundary Walls				58°11′55″N 7°01′07″W	Category B	19272	Upload another image

== Key ==
The scheme for classifying buildings in Scotland is:

- Category A: "buildings of national or international importance, either architectural or historic; or fine, little-altered examples of some particular period, style or building type."
- Category B: "buildings of regional or more than local importance; or major examples of some particular period, style or building type, which may have been altered."
- Category C: "buildings of local importance; lesser examples of any period, style, or building type, as originally constructed or moderately altered; and simple traditional buildings which group well with other listed buildings."

In March 2016 there were 47,288 listed buildings in Scotland. Of these, 8% were Category A, and 50% were Category B, with the remaining 42% being Category C.

== See also ==
- List of listed buildings in the Outer Hebrides
