= List of listed buildings in Barvas =

This is a list of listed buildings in the parish of Barvas in the Outer Hebrides, Scotland.

== List ==
Name	Location	Date Listed	Grid Ref. (Note: Sometimes known as OSGB36, the grid reference (where provided) is based on the British national grid reference system used by the Ordnance Survey. • "Guide to National Grid". Ordnance Survey. • "Get-a-map". Ordnance Survey.)	Geo-coordinates	Notes	LB Number (Note: Historic Environment Scotland assign a unique alphanumeric identifier to each designated site in Scotland, for listed buildings this always begins with "LB", for example "LB12345".)	Image
Cuiashader, Shieling At Os Grid Reference Nb 5401 5821				58°26′34″N 6°13′01″W	Category B	6600	Upload Photo
Cuiashader, Shieling At Os Grid Reference Nb 5433 5819				58°26′34″N 6°12′42″W	Category B	6598	Upload Photo
Dell, Muileann Nis (Mill)				58°28′06″N 6°18′15″W	Category B	6601	Upload Photo
Shawbost Bridge				58°19′19″N 6°41′07″W	Category C(S)	6606	Upload Photo
Cross, Church Of Scotland				58°28′27″N 6°16′46″W	Category B	5769	Upload Photo
Cross, Manse				58°28′51″N 6°17′08″W	Category B	5770	Upload Photo
Butt Of Lewis Lighthouse				58°30′56″N 6°15′39″W	Category A	5768	Upload another image See more images
Cuiashader, Sheiling At Os Grid Reference Nb 5479 5834				58°26′39″N 6°12′14″W	Category B	5771	Upload Photo
Dell, House At Nb 4893 6127				58°28′02″N 6°18′25″W	Category C(S)	6602	Upload Photo
North Shawbost, Free Church				58°19′38″N 6°40′20″W	Category C(S)	6604	Upload Photo
10 Lower Barvas, Thatch-Roofed Garage (Mr D Macritchie)				58°21′25″N 6°31′41″W	Category B	5766	Upload Photo
Bragar, Whalebone Arch				58°20′03″N 6°37′44″W	Category B	5767	Upload Photo
Barvas, Church Of Scotland				58°21′13″N 6°30′56″W	Category B	5762	Upload Photo
Barvas Lodge				58°20′58″N 6°31′13″W	Category C(S)	5764	Upload Photo
Shawbost Museum				58°19′16″N 6°41′16″W	Category C(S)	6607	Upload Photo
Barvas, Free Church (Near Lower Barvas)				58°20′55″N 6°31′32″W	Category C(S)	5763	Upload Photo
Lower Barvas, Thatch-Roofed Block On South Side Of Road				58°21′18″N 6°31′38″W	Category B	5765	Upload Photo
Cuiashader, Shielding At Os Grid Reference Nb 5468 5814				58°26′36″N 6°12′23″W	Category B	5772	Upload Photo
Cuiashader, Shieling At Os Grid Reference Nb 5397 5823				58°26′34″N 6°13′04″W	Category B	6599	Upload Photo
Eoropie, Teampull Mholuidh				58°30′13″N 6°15′37″W	Category A	6603	Upload another image
North Shawbost, Clapper Bridge At Ngr 2602 4767				58°19′54″N 6°40′56″W	Category B	6605	Upload Photo

== Key ==
The scheme for classifying buildings in Scotland is:

- Category A: "buildings of national or international importance, either architectural or historic; or fine, little-altered examples of some particular period, style or building type."
- Category B: "buildings of regional or more than local importance; or major examples of some particular period, style or building type, which may have been altered."
- Category C: "buildings of local importance; lesser examples of any period, style, or building type, as originally constructed or moderately altered; and simple traditional buildings which group well with other listed buildings."

In March 2016 there were 47,288 listed buildings in Scotland. Of these, 8% were Category A, and 50% were Category B, with the remaining 42% being Category C.

== See also ==
- List of listed buildings in the Outer Hebrides
