= List of listed buildings in the Outer Hebrides =

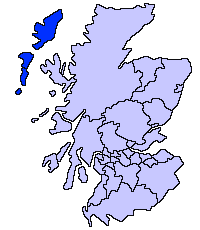
Outer Hebrides shown within Scotland

This is a list of listed buildings in the Outer Hebrides. The list is split out by parish.

- List of listed buildings in Barra
- List of listed buildings in Barvas
- List of listed buildings in Harris, Western Isles
- List of listed buildings in Lochs, Western Isles
- List of listed buildings in North Uist, Western Isles
- List of listed buildings in South Uist, Western Isles
- List of listed buildings in Stornoway, Western Isles
- List of listed buildings in Uig, Western Isles

== See also ==
- Scheduled monuments in the Outer Hebrides
