= List of listed buildings in Harris =

This is a list of listed buildings in the parish of Harris in the Western Isles of Scotland.

== List ==
Name	Location	Date Listed	Grid Ref. (Note: Sometimes known as OSGB36, the grid reference (where provided) is based on the British national grid reference system used by the Ordnance Survey. • "Guide to National Grid". Ordnance Survey. • "Get-a-map". Ordnance Survey.)	Geo-coordinates	Notes	LB Number (Note: Historic Environment Scotland assign a unique alphanumeric identifier to each designated site in Scotland, for listed buildings this always begins with "LB", for example "LB12345".)	Image
Scalpay, Eilean Glas Lighthouse, Old Lighthouse, Store And Enclosure Wall, Keeper's Cottages, Outbuildings, Jetty And Foghorn				57°51′26″N 6°38′20″W	Category A	13487	Upload another image See more images
Rodel, Building At Ngr Ng 0461/8330				57°44′31″N 6°57′56″W	Category B	12908	Upload Photo
Amhuinnsuidhe, Screen Walls, Gates And Gatepiers, To East Of Mansion				57°57′48″N 6°59′42″W	Category B	12746	Upload Photo
Amhuinnsuidhe, Boathouse				57°57′53″N 6°59′51″W	Category B	12749	Upload Photo
Tarbert, West Loch, House At Pier				57°54′00″N 6°48′52″W	Category C(S)	12602	Upload Photo
Berneray Thatched Cottage At Laimrig Ruadh At Os Grid Reference Nf 92957 81549				57°43′06″N 7°09′31″W	Category B	46100	Upload Photo
Berneray Thatched Cottage At Baile (Gatliffe Trust)				57°43′02″N 7°09′14″W	Category B	46103	Upload Photo
Berneray Risgary Barn And Byre				57°43′06″N 7°09′14″W	Category B	46108	Upload Photo
Berneray Parish Church				57°43′12″N 7°10′29″W	Category C(S)	49877	Upload Photo
Rodel, Building At Ngr Ng 0493/8286				57°44′18″N 6°57′36″W	Category C(S)	12909	Upload Photo
Ardseilhb/Manish School And Schoolhouse				57°48′06″N 6°52′01″W	Category B	12750	Upload Photo
Aline, Roadbridge (A859 Over Amhainn A'Mhuil)				58°00′28″N 6°45′10″W	Category C(S)	12766	Upload Photo
Berneray Davaar Cottage (At Pol An Oir)				57°42′39″N 7°10′38″W	Category C(S)	46097	Upload Photo
Berneray Thatched Cottages At Os Grid Reference Nf 9272 8186 And Nf 9272 8187				57°43′16″N 7°09′47″W	Category B	46098	Upload Photo
Berneray Thatched Cottage At Laimrig Ruadh At Os Grid Reference Nf 9296 8157				57°43′07″N 7°09′31″W	Category B	46101	Upload Photo
Berneray Thatched Cottage At Laimrig Ruadh At Os Grid Reference Nf 9294 8159				57°43′08″N 7°09′32″W	Category B	46102	Upload Photo
Ardvourlie Castle Including Garden Terrace Walls, Slipway And Bridge				57°59′41″N 6°45′29″W	Category B	49675	Upload Photo
Tarbert, The Pier, Tarbert Stores				57°53′51″N 6°47′55″W	Category C(S)	50799	Upload Photo
The Golden Road, Meavaig South, Muilinn Mhiabhaig (Meavag Mill)				57°52′01″N 6°48′17″W	Category C(S)	50801	Upload Photo
Leverburgh Water Tower				57°46′04″N 7°01′10″W	Category B	12906	Upload Photo
Rodel Harbour, Quays, Piers And Crane				57°44′16″N 6°57′40″W	Category B	12910	Upload Photo
Rodel St Clement's Church And Churchyard				57°44′27″N 6°57′47″W	Category A	12912	Upload another image
Amhuinnsuidhe, Former Kennels				57°57′47″N 6°59′42″W	Category C(S)	12748	Upload Photo
Berneray Former Parliamentary Church				57°43′22″N 7°09′26″W	Category B	46106	Upload another image See more images
1 Fleoideabhagh (Flodabay)				57°47′50″N 6°53′01″W	Category C(S)	50802	Upload Photo
Tarbert, Free Presbyterian Church				57°53′54″N 6°47′50″W	Category B	12866	Upload Photo
Tarbert Primary School And Schoolhouse				57°54′04″N 6°48′46″W	Category B	12867	Upload Photo
Amhuinnsuidhe, Mansion House, Including Sea-Walls And Retaining Walls				57°57′41″N 6°59′26″W	Category A	12767	Upload another image
Berneray Thatched Cottage At Baile At Os Grid Reference Nf 9315 8140				57°43′02″N 7°09′18″W	Category B	46104	Upload Photo
Berneray Former Parliamentary Manse				57°43′27″N 7°09′25″W	Category B	46107	Upload Photo
Scaristamore Scarista House Including Outbuilding				57°49′30″N 7°02′31″W	Category B	12863	Upload another image
Tarbert, Church Of Scotland Manse				57°53′50″N 6°47′50″W	Category C(S)	12865	Upload Photo
Amhuinnsuidhe, Archway And Adjoining Buildings, Including, Cottages				57°57′42″N 6°59′31″W	Category B	12747	Upload another image
Horsacleit				57°51′53″N 6°49′23″W	Category B	12752	Upload Photo
Manish Former Free Church Manse				57°47′53″N 6°52′47″W	Category C(S)	12755	Upload Photo
Berneray Thatched Cottage At Baile At Os Grid Reference Nf 9314 8138				57°43′01″N 7°09′19″W	Category B	46105	Upload Photo
Rodel Hotel				57°44′18″N 6°57′46″W	Category B	12911	Upload Photo
Tarbert, Church Of Scotland				57°53′49″N 6°47′46″W	Category C(S)	12864	Upload Photo
The Golden Road, No 9A Quidinish				57°46′49″N 6°54′02″W	Category B	50800	Upload Photo
Leverburgh Water Reservoir				57°46′05″N 7°01′10″W	Category B	12907	Upload Photo
Manish Free Church				57°47′53″N 6°52′48″W	Category B	12754	Upload Photo
Tarbert, West Loch, Pier				57°54′02″N 6°49′02″W	Category C(S)	12604	Upload Photo
Berneray Thatched Cottage At Os Grid Reference Nf 9276 8182				57°43′15″N 7°09′44″W	Category C(S)	46099	Upload Photo
Scaristamore, Harris Parish Church				57°49′27″N 7°02′32″W	Category B	13488	Upload Photo

== Key ==
The scheme for classifying buildings in Scotland is:

- Category A: "buildings of national or international importance, either architectural or historic; or fine, little-altered examples of some particular period, style or building type."
- Category B: "buildings of regional or more than local importance; or major examples of some particular period, style or building type, which may have been altered."
- Category C: "buildings of local importance; lesser examples of any period, style, or building type, as originally constructed or moderately altered; and simple traditional buildings which group well with other listed buildings."

In March 2016 there were 47,288 listed buildings in Scotland. Of these, 8% were Category A, and 50% were Category B, with the remaining 42% being Category C.

== See also ==
- List of listed buildings in the Outer Hebrides
