= List of listed buildings in South Uist =

This is a list of listed buildings in the parish of South Uist in the Outer Hebrides, Scotland.

== List ==
Name	Location	Date Listed	Grid Ref. (Note: Sometimes known as OSGB36, the grid reference (where provided) is based on the British national grid reference system used by the Ordnance Survey. • "Guide to National Grid". Ordnance Survey. • "Get-a-map". Ordnance Survey.)	Geo-coordinates	Notes	LB Number (Note: Historic Environment Scotland assign a unique alphanumeric identifier to each designated site in Scotland, for listed buildings this always begins with "LB", for example "LB12345".)	Image
South Lochboisdale Boisdale House And Post Office				57°08′13″N 7°20′18″W	Category B	18743	Upload Photo
South Smerclate (Thatched Cottage At O.S. Grid Reference Nf 743 153)				57°06′49″N 7°22′53″W	Category B	18747	Upload Photo
Benbecula, 1 Kyles Flodda				57°29′04″N 7°17′49″W	Category B	18752	Upload Photo
Benbecula Hacklet 1 Aird Cumhang				57°24′38″N 7°16′40″W	Category B	18755	Upload Photo
Benbecula 9 Liniclate				57°25′20″N 7°20′46″W	Category B	18757	Upload Photo
Benbecula 10, Uachdar				57°26′50″N 7°20′06″W	Category C(S)	18760	Upload Photo
Bornish House				57°14′39″N 7°24′46″W	Category C(S)	18761	Upload Photo
Daliburgh Church Of Scotland And Manse				57°10′05″N 7°22′27″W	Category B	18763	Upload Photo
Daliburgh St Peters R.C. Church				57°09′53″N 7°23′12″W	Category C(S)	18764	Upload Photo
North Smerclate Cottage Byre And Outbuildings				57°06′58″N 7°22′00″W	Category B	18777	Upload Photo
Rhughasinish John Mackillop				57°22′49″N 7°17′25″W	Category B	18741	Upload Photo
West Kilbride Walled Garden (Beside Site Of Kilbride House)				57°06′13″N 7°21′20″W	Category C(S)	18750	Upload Photo
Benbecula Hacklet Kilerivagh (Thatched Cottage At O.S. Grid Reference Nf 825 482)				57°24′47″N 7°17′18″W	Category C(S)	18756	Upload Photo
Benbecula 1, 2 & 3 Nunton House Outbuildings And Gatepiers				57°27′23″N 7°23′49″W	Category B	18758	Upload Photo
Drimore Farmhouse And Steading				57°20′16″N 7°22′23″W	Category B	18766	Upload Photo
Eochar 77 Ardmanonie Cottage And Outbuildings				57°23′26″N 7°22′24″W	Category A	18767	Upload Photo
Howmore Parish Church And Churchyard Walls				57°18′09″N 7°23′16″W	Category B	18771	Upload Photo
153 Howmore				57°18′07″N 7°23′02″W	Category B	18772	Upload Photo
Ardkenneth St Michael's Church Presbytery & Gatepiers				57°23′15″N 7°23′49″W	Category B	18779	Upload Photo
Our Lady Of The Isles Statue, Ben Reuval				57°20′34″N 7°21′39″W	Category B	50888	Upload another image See more images
Lochboisdale, School And School House With Garden And Boundary Walls And Gatepiers				57°09′17″N 7°18′37″W	Category C(S)	44722	Upload Photo
Benbecula, Nunton Steadings				57°27′28″N 7°23′47″W	Category B	43387	Upload Photo
Pollacher Inn				57°06′19″N 7°22′32″W	Category B	18739	Upload Photo
472 South Lochboisdale And Byre And Shed (Campbell)				57°08′07″N 7°18′57″W	Category A	18746	Upload Photo
West Kilbride Byre (At O.S. Grid Reference Nf 755 145) (Alasdair Walker)				57°06′24″N 7°21′42″W	Category B	18751	Upload Photo
Daliburgh (Thatched Cottage At O.S. Grid Reference Nf 741210)				57°09′52″N 7°23′32″W	Category B	18765	Upload Photo
Rhughasinish Flora Macleod				57°22′57″N 7°16′55″W	Category B	19907	Upload Photo
Eochar 51 Balgarva				57°23′47″N 7°22′54″W	Category B	18769	Upload Photo
Eriskay St Michael's R.C. Church				57°05′13″N 7°18′24″W	Category C(S)	18770	Upload another image
429 North Lochboisdale				57°09′44″N 7°19′28″W	Category A	18776	Upload Photo
Garrynamonie, Our Lady Of Sorrows Rc Church Including Boundary Walls And Gatepiers				57°07′28″N 7°21′33″W	Category B	51401	Upload Photo
Eochar Bualadubh Mrs Johnstone (Cottage To North Of Former Museum)				57°23′32″N 7°20′53″W	Category A	19908	Upload Photo
Benbecula 5, 6 Hacklet				57°24′43″N 7°18′16″W	Category B	18754	Upload Photo
99 Carnan				57°24′04″N 7°20′45″W	Category B	18762	Upload Photo
Eochar 96 Bualadubh				57°23′31″N 7°21′23″W	Category B	18768	Upload Photo
North Boisdale Burial Ground				57°07′52″N 7°23′45″W	Category B	18774	Upload Photo
Askernish House, Garden Walls And Gatepiers				57°11′22″N 7°24′23″W	Category B	18780	Upload Photo
Ormaclett House Beside Former Clanranald Mansion				57°15′37″N 7°24′33″W	Category C(S)	18738	Upload Photo
7 West Gerinish				57°21′09″N 7°21′48″W	Category B	18749	Upload Photo
Benbecula Griminish Church Of Scotland & Manse				57°26′40″N 7°20′08″W	Category C(S)	18753	Upload Photo
Benbecula Nunton Former Chapel & Cemetery Enclosure				57°27′32″N 7°23′40″W	Category B	18759	Upload another image
323 North Boisdale				57°08′16″N 7°23′14″W	Category B	18775	Upload Photo
Ormaclett Castle And Forecourt Wall (Clanranald Mansion)				57°15′37″N 7°24′33″W	Category B	18778	Upload another image
Isle Of South Uist, Iochdar Church Including Boundary Walls And Gatepiers				57°23′33″N 7°20′58″W	Category C(S)	48278	Upload Photo
11 Rhughasinish				57°23′08″N 7°17′55″W	Category B	18740	Upload Photo
374 South Boisdale				57°07′38″N 7°22′52″W	Category C(S)	18742	Upload Photo
466 South Lochboisdale				57°08′09″N 7°18′43″W	Category B	18744	Upload Photo
472 South Lochboisdale				57°08′05″N 7°18′53″W	Category B	18745	Upload Photo
Staoligarry Thatched Cottage (N.C.C. Office) (Property Of No 135)				57°19′23″N 7°22′09″W	Category B	18748	Upload Photo

== Key ==
The scheme for classifying buildings in Scotland is:

- Category A: "buildings of national or international importance, either architectural or historic; or fine, little-altered examples of some particular period, style or building type."
- Category B: "buildings of regional or more than local importance; or major examples of some particular period, style or building type, which may have been altered."
- Category C: "buildings of local importance; lesser examples of any period, style, or building type, as originally constructed or moderately altered; and simple traditional buildings which group well with other listed buildings."

In March 2016 there were 47,288 listed buildings in Scotland. Of these, 8% were Category A, and 50% were Category B, with the remaining 42% being Category C.

== See also ==
- List of listed buildings in the Outer Hebrides
