= List of listed buildings in North Uist =

This is a list of listed buildings in the parish of North Uist in the Outer Hebrides, Scotland.

== List ==
Name	Location	Date listed	Grid ref. (Note: Sometimes known as OSGB36, the grid reference (where provided) is based on the British national grid reference system used by the Ordnance Survey. • "Guide to National Grid". Ordnance Survey. • "Get-a-map". Ordnance Survey.)	Geo-coordinates	Notes	LB number (Note: Historic Environment Scotland assign a unique alphanumeric identifier to each designated site in Scotland, for listed buildings this always begins with "LB", for example "LB12345".)	Image
Trumisgarry Former Church				57°39′14″N 7°15′15″W	Category B	19805	Upload Photo
Claddach Carinish Cottage At Os Grid Reference Nf 857 589				57°30′40″N 7°15′02″W	Category B	17564	Upload Photo
Kilmuir Parish Church				57°36′12″N 7°28′56″W	Category C(S)	17568	Upload Photo
16 Knockline				57°34′56″N 7°26′15″W	Category B	17569	Upload Photo
9 Locheport				57°33′01″N 7°13′18″W	Category A	17570	Upload Photo
Lochmaddy, Lee View Formerly Maclean's Mansion				57°36′12″N 7°09′44″W	Category C(S)	17572	Upload Photo
Sollas Malaclete Struan Ruadh Cottages, Struan Cottage				57°38′20″N 7°22′30″W	Category A	17582	Upload another image
Ardheisker Thatched Cottage At East (Tenant Formerly D. Macleod)				57°34′47″N 7°24′56″W	Category A	17585	Upload Photo
Balranald House Garden Walls And Gatepiers				57°35′53″N 7°29′34″W	Category C(S)	17587	Upload Photo
29 Locheport				57°33′05″N 7°16′11″W	Category A	17571	Upload Photo
Lochmaddy Courthouse				57°36′16″N 7°09′45″W	Category B	17575	Upload another image
Lochmaddy Old Courthouse And Exercise Yard Walls				57°36′15″N 7°09′45″W	Category B	17576	Upload Photo
Paiblesgarry Druim Dubh (Ewan Morrison)				57°35′42″N 7°28′00″W	Category C(S)	17580	Upload Photo
Claddach Baleshare Mr D A Macquarrie				57°32′25″N 7°20′29″W	Category B	17562	Upload Photo
Loch Scolpaig Tower				57°38′46″N 7°28′54″W	Category B	17577	Upload Photo
Trumisgarry Former Manse (Miss K Bell)				57°39′13″N 7°15′15″W	Category C(S)	17583	Upload Photo
Baleloch House And Garden Walls				57°37′43″N 7°29′15″W	Category B	17586	Upload Photo
1 Cheese Bay (Thatched Cottage At Loch Aulasary)				57°38′52″N 7°06′26″W	Category B	17590	Upload Photo
Lochmaddy, Sponish House				57°36′37″N 7°09′27″W	Category B	19394	Upload another image
Paible Free Church				57°35′18″N 7°27′24″W	Category C(S)	17579	Upload Photo
Kilmuir Old Church				57°36′16″N 7°30′54″W	Category C(S)	19803	Upload Photo
24 Claddach Baleshare				57°32′37″N 7°20′29″W	Category B	17563	Upload Photo
Claddach Carinish Cottage And Byre At Os Grid Reference Nf 849 591				57°30′45″N 7°15′51″W	Category C(S)	17566	Upload Photo
Sollas Malaclete Struan Ruadh Cottages, Cottage To East Of Struan Cottage				57°38′20″N 7°22′31″W	Category B	17581	Upload Photo
Carinish School And Schoolhouse				57°31′35″N 7°19′00″W	Category B	17589	Upload Photo
Clachan-Ath-Luib War Memorial				57°33′20″N 7°19′47″W	Category C(S)	17561	Upload Photo
Monach Lighthouse And Keeper's House Including Boundary Walls And Gatepiers				57°31′33″N 7°41′41″W	Category B	17578	Upload Photo
Newton House				57°40′42″N 7°13′05″W	Category C(S)	19804	Upload Photo
Claddach Carinish Cottage At Os Grid Reference Nf 852 589				57°30′41″N 7°15′31″W	Category B	17565	Upload Photo
Kilmuir Burial Ground (Hougharry)				57°36′17″N 7°30′48″W	Category B	17567	Upload Photo
Lochmaddy Former Inn				57°35′56″N 7°09′33″W	Category B	17573	Upload Photo
Westford Inn				57°34′13″N 7°23′48″W	Category B	17584	Upload Photo
Carinish Church Of Scotland				57°31′18″N 7°18′51″W	Category B	17588	Upload Photo

== Key ==
The scheme for classifying buildings in Scotland is:

- Category A: "buildings of national or international importance, either architectural or historic; or fine, little-altered examples of some particular period, style or building type."
- Category B: "buildings of regional or more than local importance; or major examples of some particular period, style or building type, which may have been altered."
- Category C: "buildings of local importance; lesser examples of any period, style, or building type, as originally constructed or moderately altered; and simple traditional buildings which group well with other listed buildings."

In March 2016 there were 47,288 listed buildings in Scotland. Of these, 8% were Category A, and 50% were Category B, with the remaining 42% being Category C.

== See also ==
- List of listed buildings in the Outer Hebrides
