= List of acts of the Parliament of the United Kingdom from 1801 =

This is a complete list of acts of the Parliament of the United Kingdom for the year 1801.

Note that the first parliament of the United Kingdom was held in 1801; parliaments between 1707 and 1800 were either parliaments of Great Britain or of Ireland). For acts passed up until 1707, see the list of acts of the Parliament of England and the list of acts of the Parliament of Scotland. For acts passed from 1707 to 1800, see the list of acts of the Parliament of Great Britain. See also the list of acts of the Parliament of Ireland.

For acts of the devolved parliaments and assemblies in the United Kingdom, see the list of acts of the Scottish Parliament, the list of acts of the Northern Ireland Assembly, and the list of acts and measures of Senedd Cymru; see also the list of acts of the Parliament of Northern Ireland.

The number shown after each act's title is its chapter number. Acts passed before 1963 are cited using this number, preceded by the year(s) of the reign during which the relevant parliamentary session was held; thus the Union with Ireland Act 1800 is cited as "39 & 40 Geo. 3 c. 67", meaning the 67th act passed during the session that started in the 39th year of the reign of George III and which finished in the 40th year of that reign. Note that the modern convention is to use Arabic numerals in citations (thus "41 Geo. 3" rather than "41 Geo. III"). Acts of the last session of the Parliament of Great Britain and the first session of the Parliament of the United Kingdom are both cited as "41 Geo. 3". Acts passed from 1963 onwards are simply cited by calendar year and chapter number.

All modern acts have a short title, e.g. "the Local Government Act 2003". Some earlier acts also have a short title given to them by later acts, such as by the Short Titles Act 1896.

== 41 Geo. 3 ==
The first session of the 1st Parliament of the United Kingdom, which met from 22 January 1801 until 2 July 1801.

This session was also traditionally cited as 41 G. 3.

=== Public general acts ===
Short title	Citation	Royal assent
Long title
Use of Fine Flour Act 1801 (repealed)	41 Geo. 3. (U.K.) c. 1	9 February 1801
An Act to suspend, until the twenty-fifth day of March one thousand eight hundred and one, so much of an act made in the last session of parliament, (Note: Making of Bread, etc. Act 1800 (41 Geo. 3. (G.B.) c. 16)) intituled, "An act to prevent, until the sixth day of November one thousand eight hundred and one, and from thence to the end of six weeks from the commencement of the then next session of parliament, the manufacturing of any fine flour from wheat or other grain, and the making of any bread solely from the fine flour of wheat; and to repeal an act passed in the thirty-sixth year of the reign of his present Majesty, (Note: Making of Bread Act 1795 (36 Geo. 3. c. 22)) for permitting bakers to make and sell certain sorts of bread, and to make more effectual provision for the same;" as relates to other grain than wheat; and for indemnifying persons who may have dressed, sold, or used any meal or flour of such other grain finer than is prescribed by the said act. (Repealed by Statute Law Revision Act 1872 (35 & 36 Vict. c. 63))
Use of Fine Flour (No. 2) Act 1801 (repealed)	41 Geo. 3. (U.K.) c. 2	24 February 1801
An act to repeal an act made in the last session of parliament, intituled, "An act to prevent, until the sixth day of November one thousand eight hundred and one, and from thence to the end of six weeks from the commencement of the then next session of parliament, the manufacturing of any fine flour from wheat or other grain, and the making of any bread solely from the fine flour of wheat; and to repeal an act passed in the thirty-sixth year of the reign of his present Majesty, for permitting bakers to make and sell certain sorts of bread, and to make more effectual provision for the same;" and to indemnify millers and other persons who have dressed, sold, or used any meal or flour of such other grain finer than is prescribed by the said act. (Repealed by Statute Law Revision Act 1872 (35 & 36 Vict. c. 63))
National Debt Act 1801 (repealed)	41 Geo. 3. (U.K.) c. 3	12 March 1801
An Act for raising the sum of twenty-eight millions by way of annuities. (Repealed by Statute Law Revision Act 1870 (33 & 34 Vict. c. 69))
Unfunded Debt Act 1801 (repealed)	41 Geo. 3. (U.K.) c. 4	12 March 1801
An act to enable the lords commissioners of his Majesty's treasury to issue exchequer bills, on the credit of such aids or supplies as have been or shall be granted by parliament, for the service of the year one thousand eight hundred and one. (Repealed by Statute Law Revision Act 1872 (35 & 36 Vict. c. 63))
Annuity to Sir Sidney Smith Act 1801 (repealed)	41 Geo. 3. (U.K.) c. 5	24 March 1801
An Act to enable his Majesty to grant a certain annuity to captain Sir Sidney Smith, in consideration of the eminent services which he has rendered during his command on the coast of Egypt. (Repealed by Statute Law Revision Act 1872 (35 & 36 Vict. c. 63))
Militia (Ireland) Act 1801 (repealed)	41 Geo. 3. (U.K.) c. 6	24 March 1801
An Act for increasing the number of field officers of the several regiments of militia in Ireland. (Repealed by Militia (Ireland) Act 1809 (49 Geo. 3. c. 120))
Postage Act 1801 (repealed)	41 Geo. 3. (U.K.) c. 7	24 March 1801
An Act for repealing the rates and duties of postage in Great Britain, and granting other rates and duties in lieu thereof, and on letters conveyed to or from any part of the united kingdom from or to any place out of the said kingdom, and by packet boats from or to the ports of Holyhead and Milford Haven. (Repealed by Post Office (Repeal of Laws) Act 1837 (7 Will. 4 & 1 Vict. c. 32))
Taxation Act 1801 (repealed)	41 Geo. 3. (U.K.) c. 8	24 March 1801
An Act for granting to his Majesty certain additional duties on paper, pasteboard, millboard, and scaleboard, made in or imported into Great Britain; and on tea imported into and sold in Great Britain. (Repealed by Duties on Paper Act 1839 (2 & 3 Vict. c. 23))
Duty on Horses Act 1801 (repealed)	41 Geo. 3. (U.K.) c. 9	24 March 1801
An act for granting to his Majesty certain additional duties on horses in Great Britain; and for exempting from duty, horses kept for the purpose of husbandry, by persons holding farms under a certain value. (Repealed by House Tax Act 1803 (43 Geo. 3. c. 161))
Taxation (No. 2) Act 1801 (repealed)	41 Geo. 3. (U.K.) c. 10	24 March 1801
An act for granting to his Majesty additional stamp duties on bills of exchange, promissory notes, and insurances; and on certain indentures, leases, bonds, or other deeds. (Repealed by Statute Law Revision Act 1861 (24 & 25 Vict. c. 101))
Mutiny Act 1801 (repealed)	41 Geo. 3. (U.K.) c. 11	24 March 1801
An act for punishing mutiny and desertion; and for the better payment of the army and their quarters. (Repealed by Statute Law Revision Act 1872 (35 & 36 Vict. c. 63))
Sale of Bread Act 1801 (repealed)	41 Geo. 3. (U.K.) c. 12	24 March 1801
An act to amend an act made in the thirty-sixth year of tho reign of his present Majesty, intituled, "An act to permit bakers to make and sell certain sorts of bread." (Repealed by London Bread Trade Act 1815 (55 Geo. 3. c. xcix) and by Bread Act 1819 (59 Geo. 3. c. 36))
Bounties Act 1801 (repealed)	41 Geo. 3. (U.K.) c. 13	24 March 1801
An Act for increasing the bounties granted by an act of the last session of parliament, (Note: Bounties on Importation (No. 2) Act 1800 (41 Geo. 3. (G.B.) c. 10)) on flour imported from America, in ships which shall have cleared out between certain periods. (Repealed by Statute Law Revision Act 1872 (35 & 36 Vict. c. 63))
Suppression of Rebellion (Ireland) Act 1801 (repealed)	41 Geo. 3. (U.K.) c. 14	24 March 1801
An act for amending and further continuing, until the twenty-fourth day of June one thousand eight hundred and one, two acts, passed in that part of the united kingdom called Ireland, in the thirty-ninth (Note: Courts Martial Act 1799 (39 Geo. 3. c. 11 (I))) and fortieth (Note: Courts Martial Act 1800 (40 Geo. 3. c. 2 (I))) years of the reign of his present Majesty, for the suppression of the rebellion which still exists within that kingdom, and for the protection of the persons and properties of his Majesty's faithful subjects within the same. (Repealed by Statute Law Revision Act 1872 (35 & 36 Vict. c. 63))
Habeas Corpus Suspension (Ireland) Act 1801 (repealed)	41 Geo. 3. (U.K.) c. 15	24 March 1801
An act to continue until the twenty fourth day of June one thousand eight hundred and one, an act, made in the last session of the parliament of Ireland (Note: Habeas Corpus Suspension Act 1800 (40 Geo. 3. c. 18 (I))) intituled, "An act to empower the lord lieutenant or other chief governor or governors of Ireland, to apprehend and detain such persons as he or they shall suspect for conspiring against his Majesty's person and government. (Repealed by Statute Law Revision Act 1872 (35 & 36 Vict. c. 63))
Malting etc. from Grain Act 1801 (repealed)	41 Geo. 3. (U.K.) c. 16	24 March 1801
An Act to prohibit until the Twenty-fifth Day of March One thousand eight hundred and two, the making of Malt and the distilling of Spirits from Corn or Grain in Ireland. (Repealed by Statute Law Revision Act 1872 (35 & 36 Vict. c. 63))
Duties Continuance Act 1801 (repealed)	41 Geo. 3. (U.K.) c. 17	24 March 1801
An act for continuing, until the twenty-fifth day March one thousand eight hundred and two, certain acts of the last session of the parliament of Ireland, for granting duties to his Majesty. (Repealed by Statute Law Revision Act 1872 (35 & 36 Vict. c. 63))
Marine Mutiny Act 1801 (repealed)	41 Geo. 3. (U.K.) c. 18	24 March 1801
An Act for the regulation of his Majesty's marine forces while on shore, until the twenty-fifth day of March one thousand eight hundred and two. (Repealed by Statute Law Revision Act 1872 (35 & 36 Vict. c. 63))
Merchant Shipping Act 1801 (repealed)	41 Geo. 3. (U.K.) c. 19	2 April 1801
An act for reviving and continuing, until the first day of October one thousand eight hundred and one, so much of an act made in the thirty-ninth and fortieth years of the reign of his present Majesty, (Note: Continuance of Laws (No. 3) Act 1800 (39 & 40 Geo. 3. c. 20)) as relates to the reducing and better collecting the duties payable on the importation of starch; for reviving and continuing, until six weeks after the commencement of the next session of parliament, and amending an act made in the thirty-ninth year of the reign of his present Majesty, (Note: Importation (No. 7) Act 1799 (39 Geo. 3. c. 112)) for enabling his Majesty to permit goods to be imported into Great Britain, in neutral ships; for reviving and continuing, until the twenty-fifth day of March one thousand eight hundred and four, and from thence until the expiration of six week after the commencement of the then next session of parliament, an act made in the thirty-seventh year of the reign of his present Majesty, (Note: Cape of Good Hope Trade Act 1796 (37 Geo. 3. c. 21)) for authorising his Majesty to make regulations respecting the trade and commerce to and from the Cape of Good Hope; and for reviving and making perpetual an act, made in the thirty-third year of the reign of his present Majesty, (Note: Shipping Offences Act 1793 (33 Geo. 3. c. 67)) for preventing offences in obstructing, destroying, or damaging ships, and in obstructing seamen and others from pursuing their lawful occupations. (Repealed by Statute Law Revision Act 1872 (35 & 36 Vict. c. 63))
Improvement of Commons Act 1801 (repealed)	41 Geo. 3. (U.K.) c. 20	2 April 1801
An act to extend, until the twenty-ninth day of September one thousand eight hundred and one, the provisions of an act made in the thirteenth year of the reign of his present Majesty, intituled, "An act for the better cultivation, improvement, and regulation of the common arable fields, wastes, and commons of pasture, in this kingdom, and for encouraging the cultivation of potatoes in open and common field lands." (Note: Inclosure Act 1773 (13 Geo. 3. c. 81)) (Repealed by Statute Law Revision Act 1872 (35 & 36 Vict. c. 63))
Exportation Act 1801 (repealed)	41 Geo. 3. (U.K.) c. 21	18 April 1801
An act for permitting East India goods prohibited to be worn or used in Great Britain, and warehoused, in pursuance of an act made in the thirty-ninth year of the reign of his present Majesty, (Note: Warehousing of Goods Act 1799 (39 Geo. 3. c. 59)) to be removed by land carriage to certain ports, for the purpose of being exported to the British colonies or plantations in the West Indies. (Repealed by Customs Law Repeal Act 1825 (6 Geo. 4. c. 105))
Apprenticeship Indentures Act 1801 (repealed)	41 Geo. 3. (U.K.) c. 22	18 April 1801
An act to render valid indentures of apprenticeship of poor children and others, made upon improper stamps, upon certain conditions; and to indemnify all persons who may nave incurred penalties thereby. (Repealed by Statute Law Revision Act 1872 (35 & 36 Vict. c. 63))
Poor Rate Act 1801 (repealed)	41 Geo. 3. (U.K.) c. 23	18 April 1801
An act for the letter collection of rates made for the relief of the poor. (Repealed by General Rate Act 1967 (c. 9))
Compensation for Injuries to Mills, etc. Act 1801 (repealed)	41 Geo. 3. (U.K.) c. 24	18 April 1801
An Act for the indemnifying of persons injured by the forcible pulling down and demolishing of mills, or of works thereunto belonging, by persons unlawfully and riotously assembled. (Repealed by Statute Law Revision Act 1887 (50 & 51 Vict. c. 59))
Master of the Rolls (Ireland) Act 1801 (repealed)	41 Geo. 3. (U.K.) c. 25	18 April 1801
An act for the better regulation of the office of master of the rolls, in that part of the united kingdom called Ireland; and for augmenting the salary annexed to the said office. (Repealed by Court of Chancery (Ireland) Act 1823 (4 Geo. 4. c. 61), Statute Law Revision Act 1872 (35 & 36 Vict. c. 63) and Statute Law Revision Act 1950 (14 Geo. 6. c. 6))
Habeas Corpus Suspension Act 1801 (repealed)	41 Geo. 3. (U.K.) c. 26	18 April 1801
An act for reviving and further continuing, until six Weeks after the Commencement of the next Session of Parliament, several Acts, made in the thirty-eighth, (Note: Habeas Corpus Suspension Act 1798 (38 Geo. 3. c. 36)) thirty-ninth, (Note: Habeas Corpus Suspension Act 1799 (39 Geo. 3. c. 15)) and fortieth (Note: Habeas Corpus Suspension Act 1800 (39 & 40 Geo. 3. c. 20)) Years of his present Majesty's Reign, and in the last Session of Parliament, (Note: Habeas Corpus Suspension (No. 2) Act 1800 (41 Geo. 3. (G.B.) c. 32)) for empowering his Majesty to secure and detain such Persons as his Majesty shall suspect are conspiring against his Person and Governments. (Repealed by Statute Law Revision Act 1872 (35 & 36 Vict. c. 63))
Lottery Act 1801 (repealed)	41 Geo. 3. (U.K.) c. 27	30 April 1801
An act for granting to his Majesty a certain sum of money for the service of Great Britain, to be raised by a lottery. (Repealed by Statute Law Revision Act 1872 (35 & 36 Vict. c. 63))
Taxation (No. 3) Act 1801 (repealed)	41 Geo. 3. (U.K.) c. 28	30 April 1801
An act for granting to his Majesty certain Duties of Customs on Timber, Sugar, Raisins, and Pepper, imported into, and on Lead exported from, Great Britain. (Repealed by Statute Law Revision Act 1861 (24 & 25 Vict. c. 101))
Taxation (No. 4) Act 1801 (repealed)	41 Geo. 3. (U.K.) c. 29	30 April 1801
An act for granting an additional Duty on English Spirits imported into Scotland, and for allowing, until forty Days after the Commencement of the next Session of Parliament, the Distillation of Spirits in Scotland, from Melasses or Sugar, at a lower Rate of Duty. (Repealed by Statute Law Revision Act 1861 (24 & 25 Vict. c. 101))
Seditious Meetings Prevention Act 1801 (repealed)	41 Geo. 3. (U.K.) c. 30	30 April 1801
An act to revive and continue, until six Weeks after the Commencement of the next Session of Parliament, an Act, made in the thirty-sixth Year of the Reign of his present Majesty, intituled, "An act for the more effectually preventing seditious Meetings and Assemblies." (Note: Seditious Meetings Act 1795 (36 Geo. 3. c. 8)) (Repealed by Statute Law Revision Act 1872 (35 & 36 Vict. c. 63))
Steeping of Barley Act 1801 (repealed)	41 Geo. 3. (U.K.) c. 31	30 April 1801
An act to revive and continue, until the fifth Day of July one thousand eight hundred and one, an Act, made in the last Session of Parliament, intituled, "An act for shortening, until the twenty fifth Day of March one thousand eight hundred and one, the Time of keeping in Steep, for Malting, Barley damaged by Rain in the last Harvest." (Note: Malting Act 1800 (41 Geo. 3. (G.B.) c. 6)) (Repealed by Statute Law Revision Act 1872 (35 & 36 Vict. c. 63))
Irish Charges Act 1801 (repealed)	41 Geo. 3. (U.K.) c. 32	30 April 1801
An Act for granting to his Majesty several sums of money for defraying the charge of certain permanent services in that part of the united kingdom called Ireland. (Repealed by Statute Law (Repeals) Act 1986 (c. 12))
Taxation (No. 5) Act 1801 (repealed)	41 Geo. 3. (U.K.) c. 33	30 April 1801
An act for repealing certain Duties upon Tea imported into Ireland, and for granting other Duties in lieu thereof; and for granting additional Duties on Sugar and Coals imported into Ireland. (Repealed by Statute Law Revision Act 1861 (24 & 25 Vict. c. 101))
Bounties (No. 2) Act 1801 (repealed)	41 Geo. 3. (U.K.) c. 34	30 April 1801
An act for granting Bounties on the Importation into Ireland of Wheat, Barley, Rye, Oats, and Indian Corn, and of Barley, Rye, Oats, Indian Meal, and Wheaten Flour and Rice. (Repealed by Statute Law Revision Act 1872 (35 & 36 Vict. c. 63))
Quartering of Soldiers Act 1801 (repealed)	41 Geo. 3. (U.K.) c. 35	30 April 1801
An act for increasing the Rates of Subsistence to be paid to Inn-keepers and others on quartering Soldiers. (Repealed by Statute Law Revision Act 1872 (35 & 36 Vict. c. 63))
Exportation, etc. Act 1801 (repealed)	41 Geo. 3. (U.K.) c. 36	21 May 1801
An act For enabling the Lord Lieutenant, or other Chief Governor or Governors of Ireland, to prohibit for a limited Time, so as such Prohibition shall not endure beyond the Expiration of six Weeks from the Commencement of the next Session of Parliament, the Exportation from Ireland of Corn or Potatoes, and of all Provisions whatsoever; and to permit for such limited Time the Importation into Ireland of Corn and Fish, and all Provisions whatsoever, without Payment of Duty; and for indemnifying such Persons as have acted for the Service of the Publick, in advising or carrying into Execution certain Proclamations of the Lord Lieutenant and Council of Ireland. (Repealed by Statute Law Revision Act 1872 (35 & 36 Vict. c. 63))
Importation Act 1801 (repealed)	41 Geo. 3. (U.K.) c. 37	21 May 1801
An act for making Provision for the Entry and Return Voyages of certain Ships which may import Rice or other Grain from the East Indies, and to authorize the Importation of Rice or other Grain into Ireland, in Ships coming directly from the East Indies. (Repealed by Statute Law Revision Act 1872 (35 & 36 Vict. c. 63))
Combinations of Workmen Act 1801 (repealed)	41 Geo. 3. (U.K.) c. 38	21 May 1801
An act to amend so much of an Act passed in the thirty-ninth and fortieth Years of the Reign of his present Majesty, (Note: Unlawful Combinations of Workmen Act 1800 (39 & 40 Geo. 3. c. 106)) intituled, "An act to repeal an Act passed in the last Session of Parliament, (Note: Combination Act 1799 (39 Geo. 3. c. 81)) intituled, 'An act to prevent unlawful Combinations of Workmen, and to substitute other Provisions in lieu thereof; as relates to the Forms of Conviction therein referred to. (Repealed by Masters and Workmen Arbitration Act 1824 (5 Geo. 4. c. 96))
Forgery of Banknotes Act 1801 (repealed)	41 Geo. 3. (U.K.) c. 39	21 May 1801
An act for the more effectually preventing the Forgery of Bank Notes, Bank Bills of Exchange, and Bank Post Bills. (Repealed by Statute Law Revision Act 1872 (35 & 36 Vict. c. 63))
Taxation (No. 6) Act 1801 (repealed)	41 Geo. 3. (U.K.) c. 40	21 May 1801
An act to permit Persons in Holy Orders to keep one Horse only for the Purpose of Riding, without being subject to the Duty granted by an Act of the thirty-eighth Year of the Reign of his present Majesty, (Note: Duties on Servants, etc. Act 1798 (38 Geo. 3. c. 41)) under certain Limitations. (Repealed by House Tax Act 1803 (43 Geo. 3. c. 161))
Importation (No. 2) Act 1801 (repealed)	41 Geo. 3. (U.K.) c. 41	21 May 1801
An act for allowing, until the twentieth Day of August one thousand eight hundred and one, the Importation into Ireland of British and Foreign Hops at a like Duty as is payable in Great Britain for the same. (Repealed by Statute Law Revision Act 1872 (35 & 36 Vict. c. 63))
Taxation (No. 7) Act 1801 (repealed)	41 Geo. 3. (U.K.) c. 42	21 May 1801
An Act to exempt elephant (Note: 'Sea elephants', now known as sea cows.) oil sold by auction in Great Britain from the duty imposed on such sales. (Repealed by Statute Law Revision Act 1861 (24 & 25 Vict. c. 101))
Militia Pay (England) Act 1801 (repealed)	41 Geo. 3. (U.K.) c. 43	21 May 1801
An act for defraying the Charge of the Pay and Cloathing of the Militia in England, for the Year one thousand eight hundred and one. (Repealed by Statute Law Revision Act 1872 (35 & 36 Vict. c. 63))
Taxation (No. 8) Act 1801 (repealed)	41 Geo. 3. (U.K.) c. 44	20 June 1801
An act for reviving, continuing until the twentieth Day of May one thousand eight hundred and two, and amending an Act made in the thirty-ninth and fortieth Years of the Reign of his present Majesty, (Note: Duties on Sugar, etc. Act 1800 (39 & 40 Geo. 3. c. 48)) intituled, "An act to repeal the Duties on Sugar and Coffee exported, granted by an Act passed in the thirty-ninth Year of his present Majesty's Reign, (Note: Duties on Sugar, etc. Act 1799 (39 Geo. 3. c. 63)) for allowing British Plantation Sugar to be warehoused; for reviving so much of an Act made in the thirty-second Year of the Reign of his present Majesty, (Note: Customs (No. 2) Act 1792 (32 Geo. 3. c. 43)) as relates to the ascertaining the Average Price of Sugar, and regulating the Allowance of Drawback on the Exportation thereof; and for allowing certain Drawbacks on Sugar exported, until the tenth Day of May one thousand eight hundred and one. (Repealed by Statute Law Revision Act 1872 (35 & 36 Vict. c. 63))
Continuance of Laws Act 1801 (repealed)	41 Geo. 3. (U.K.) c. 45	20 June 1801
An act to continue, until the twenty-ninth Day of September one thousand eight hundred and two, several Laws passed in the Parliament of Ireland, relating to the regulating and extending the Tobacco Trade, and securing the Duties payable on Tobacco; to the collecting and Securing the Duties upon Malt; to the Securing the Duties on Auctions and Glass Bottles, and on Paper printed, painted, or stained to serve for Hangings; to the regulating the Trade of rectifying Spirits and preventing Frauds by Rectifiers; to the further Improvement of the Fisheries on the Coasts of Ireland; to the better Collection of the Duties on tanned Hides and Skins, and on Vellum, and Parchment; to the better regulating the granting of Permits and Certificates for the Conveyance of Exciseable Goods; to the regulating the Payment of Bounties on the Exportation of certain Manufactures; to the better Securing the Duties on Licences to Persons engaged in certain Trades; to the better regulating the Collection of his Majesty's Revenue, and preventing Frauds therein; and to revive and continue until the said twenty-ninth Day of September, an Act passed in the Parliament of Ireland in the thirteenth and fourteenth Years of his present Majesty's Reign (Note: Annuities Act 1773 (13 & 14 Geo. 3. c. 5 (I))) for granting Annuities In Manner therein provided. (Repealed by Statute Law Revision Act 1872 (35 & 36 Vict. c. 63))
Indemnity for Certain Acts Act 1801 (repealed)	41 Geo. 3. (U.K.) c. 46	20 June 1801
An act to render valid all Acts done in Execution of three Several Orders of his Majesty in Council relating to Bills of Exchange drawn by Persons in Russia, and to Freight of Russia, Swedish, and Danish Ships. (Repealed by Statute Law Revision Act 1872 (35 & 36 Vict. c. 63))
Crown Lands (Taxation) Act 1801 (repealed)	41 Geo. 3. (U.K.) c. 47	20 June 1801
An act to amend and continue until the twenty-ninth Day of September one thousand eight hundred and two, an Act passed in Ireland in the fortieth Year of the Reign of his present Majesty, (Note: Distillers Act 1800 (40 Geo. 3. c. 67 (I))) intituled, "An act for regulating the Trade of a Distiller, and for securing the Duties payable on Home-made Spirits. (Repealed by Statute Law Revision Act 1872 (35 & 36 Vict. c. 63))
Sale of Wine, etc. Act 1801 (repealed)	41 Geo. 3. (U.K.) c. 48	20 June 1801
An act to continue until the twenty-ninth Day of September one thousand eight hundred and two, and amend the Several Laws in Ireland to regulate the issuing of Licences for the Sale of Wine, Ale, Beer, Cider, and Spirituous Liquors by Retail, and for preventing the immoderate Use of Spirituous Liquors. (Repealed by Statute Law Revision Act 1861 (24 & 25 Vict. c. 101))
Indemnity (Ireland) Act 1801 (repealed)	41 Geo. 3. (U.K.) c. 49	20 June 1801
An act to indemnify Persons who have omitted to qualify themselves for Offices or Employments in Ireland according to Law. (Repealed by Statute Law Revision Act 1872 (35 & 36 Vict. c. 63))
Foundling Hospital, Dublin Act 1801 (repealed)	41 Geo. 3. (U.K.) c. 50	20 June 1801
An act for granting to his Majesty a certain Sum of Money for defraying the Charge of the Workhouse and Foundling Hospital in Dublin, for the Year one thousand eight hundred and one; and for amending an Act, passed in the Parliament of Ireland in the fortieth Year of the Reign of his present Majesty, (Note: Rotunda Hospital Act 1800 (40 Geo. 3. c. 33 (I))) intituled, "An act for the better Management, Support, and Maintenance of the Foundling Hospital in Dublin; and for amending and further continuing an Act, passed in the thirty-eighth Year of his present Majesty's Reign, (Note: Dublin Workhouse, &c. Act 1798 (38 Geo. 3. c. 35 (I))) intituled, 'An act for the better Management of the Workhouse and Foundling Hospital in Dublin.'" (Repealed by Dublin Foundling Hospital Act 1810 (50 Geo. 3. c. cxcii))
Taxation (No. 9) Act 1801 (repealed)	41 Geo. 3. (U.K.) c. 51	20 June 1801
An Act to permit Portugal wine to be landed and warehoused without payment of duties, under certain restrictions, for a limited time. (Repealed by Statute Law Revision Act 1872 (35 & 36 Vict. c. 63))
House of Commons (Disqualifications) Act 1801 or the House of Commons (Disqualification) Act 1801	41 Geo. 3. (U.K.) c. 52	20 June 1801
An Act for declaring what Persons shall be disabled from sitting and voting in the House of Commons of the United Kingdom of Great Britain and Ireland; and also for carrying into effect Part of the Fourth Article of the Union of Great Britain and Ireland, by providing in what cases Persons holding Offices or Places of Profit under the Crown of Ireland shall be incapable of being Members of the House of Commons of the Parliament of the said United Kingdom.
Damaging of Hides Act 1801 (repealed)	41 Geo. 3. (U.K.) c. 53	20 June 1801
An act to explain and amend an Act, passed in the thirty-ninth and fortieth Years of the Reign of his present Majesty, (Note: Use of Horse Hides, etc. Act 1800 (39 & 40 Geo. 3. c. 66)) intituled, "An act to repeal so much of an Act, passed in the second Year of King James the First, (Note: Leather Act 1603 (1 Jas. 1. c. 22)) as prohibits the Use of Horse Hides in making Boots and Shoes, and for better preventing the damaging of Raw Hides and Skins in the flaying thereof." (Repealed by Horse Hides Act 1824 (5 Geo. 4. c. 57))
Isle of Man Trade Act 1801 (repealed)	41 Geo. 3. (U.K.) c. 54	20 June 1801
An act to continue, until the fifth Day of July one thousand eight hundred and two, an Act passed in the thirty-eighth Year of the Reign of his present Majesty, (Note: Isle of Man Trade Act 1798 (38 Geo. 3. c. 63)) for the further Encouragement of the Trade and Manufactures of the Isle of Man, and for improving the Revenue thereof; and also to repeal and amend certain of the Provisions of the said Act. (Repealed by Statute Law Revision Act 1872 (35 & 36 Vict. c. 63))
Militia Allowances Act 1801 (repealed)	41 Geo. 3. (U.K.) c. 55	20 June 1801
An act to revive and continue, until the twenty-fifth Day of March one thousand eight hundred and two, so much of an Act made in the thirty-ninth and fortieth Years of the Reign of his present Majesty, (Note: Militia Allowances Act 1800 (39 & 40 Geo. 3. c. 44)) as grants certain Allowances to Adjutants, Serjeant Majors, and Serjeants of Militia, disembodied under an Act of the same Session of Parliament, (Note: Militia Act 1799 (39 & 40 Geo. 3. c. 1)) and to amend the said Act. (Repealed by Statute Law Revision Act 1872 (35 & 36 Vict. c. 63))
Militia Allowances (No. 2) Act 1801 (repealed)	41 Geo. 3. (U.K.) c. 56	20 June 1801
An act for making Allowances in certain Cases to Subaltern Officers of the Militia in Time of Peace. (Repealed by Statute Law Revision Act 1872 (35 & 36 Vict. c. 63))
Bank Notes Forgery Act 1801 (repealed)	41 Geo. 3. (U.K.) c. 57	20 June 1801
An act for the better Prevention of the Forgery of the Notes and Bills of Exchange of Persons carrying on the Business of Bankers. (Repealed by Forgery and Counterfeiting Act 1981 (c. 45))
Stamps (Ireland) Act 1801 (repealed)	41 Geo. 3. (U.K.) c. 58	20 June 1801
An act for granting to his Majesty, until the twenty-fifth Day of March one thousand eight hundred and two, additional Stamp Duties in Ireland, on Bonds, Bills of Exchange, and Promissory Notes, and on certain Insurances therein mentioned; and for the Relief of Persons in Ireland holding Obligatory Instruments called Kerry Bonds, which have been executed without being duly stamped. (Repealed by Statute Law Revision Act 1872 (35 & 36 Vict. c. 63))
Annuities to Lady Abercrombie, etc. Act 1801 (repealed)	41 Geo. 3. (U.K.) c. 59	20 June 1801
An act for settling and securing a certain Annuity on Lady Abercromby, Baroness Abercromby of Aboukir, and the two next Persons to whom the Title of Baron Abercromby shall descend, in Consideration of the eminent Merits of the late Right Honourable General Sir Ralph Abercromby. (Repealed by Statute Law Revision Act 1872 (35 & 36 Vict. c. 63))
Composition for a Crown Debt Act 1801 (repealed)	41 Geo. 3. (U.K.) c. 60	20 June 1801
An Act to explain and amend an Act passed in the Thirty-fourth Year of the Reign of his present Majesty, intituled, "An Act to enable the Lords Commissioners of His Majesty's Treasury to ascertain what sum shall be paid into His Majesty's Exchequer, in full Satisfaction of the Debt due on the Mortgage made by the late John Gardner Kemeys, Esquire, in Trust for the late Right Honourable Richard Rigby, in case it shall appear to the said Lords Commissioners that it will be necessary to resort to the mortgaged Premises, in order to recover the Balance due from the said Richard Rigby to His Majesty." (Note: Crown Debt from Late Right Honourable Richard Rigby Act 1794 (34 Geo. 3. c. 66)) (Repealed by Statute Law Revision Act 1950 (14 Geo. 6. c. 6))
Suppression of Rebellion (Ireland) (No. 2) Act 1801 (repealed)	41 Geo. 3. (U.K.) c. 61	23 June 1801
An act for further continuing until the twenty-fifth Day of March one thousand eight hundred and two, an Act passed in the present Session of Parliament, (Note: Suppression of Rebellion (Ireland) Act 1801 (41 Geo. 3. (U.K.) c. 14)) intituled, "An act for amending and further continuing until the twenty-fourth Day of June one thousand eight hundred and One, two Acts passed in that Part of the United Kingdom called Ireland, in the thirty-ninth and fortieth Year of the Reign of his present Majesty, for the Suppression of the Rebellion which still exists within that Kingdom, and for the Protection of the Persons and Property of his Majesty's faithful Subjects within the same." (Repealed by Statute Law Revision Act 1872 (35 & 36 Vict. c. 63))
Taxation (No. 10) Act 1801 (repealed)	41 Geo. 3. (U.K.) c. 62	23 June 1801
An act to exempt from the Payment of certain Duties, such Members of both Houses of Parliament serving for that Part of the United Kingdom called Ireland, and such other Persons herein described, as may have only an occasional Residence in Great Britain. (Repealed by Statute Law Revision Act 1861 (24 & 25 Vict. c. 101))
House of Commons (Clergy Disqualification) Act 1801 (repealed)	41 Geo. 3. (U.K.) c. 63	23 June 1801
An Act to remove Doubts respecting the Eligibility of Persons in Holy Orders to sit in the House of Commons. (Repealed by House of Commons (Removal of Clergy Disqualification) Act 2001 (c. 13))
Debtors Relief Act 1801 (repealed)	41 Geo. 3. (U.K.) c. 64	23 June 1801
An act for the further Relief of Debtors, with respect to the Imprisonment of their Persons. (Repealed by Statute Law Revision Act 1872 (35 & 36 Vict. c. 63))
National Debt (No. 2) Act 1801 (repealed)	41 Geo. 3. (U.K.) c. 65	24 June 1801
An act for granting to his Majesty the Sum of two hundred thousand Pounds, to be issued and paid to the Governor and Company of the Bank of England, to be by them placed to the Account of the Commissioners for the Reduction of the National Debt of Greet Britain. (Repealed by Statute Law Revision Act 1861 (24 & 25 Vict. c. 101))
Indemnity Act 1801 (repealed)	41 Geo. 3. (U.K.) c. 66	24 June 1801
An act for indemnifying such Persons as, since the first Day of February one thousand seven hundred and ninety-three, have acted in the apprehending, imprisoning, or detaining in Custody, in Great Britain, of Persons suspected of High Treason or Treasonable Practices. (Repealed by Statute Law Revision Act 1872 (35 & 36 Vict. c. 63))
Militia (Scotland) Act 1801 (repealed)	41 Geo. 3. (U.K.) c. 67	24 June 1801
An act to amend several Acts for raising a Militia Force in Scotland. (Repealed by Statute Law Revision Act 1872 (35 & 36 Vict. c. 63))
Importation, etc. Act 1801 (repealed)	41 Geo. 3. (U.K.) c. 68	24 June 1801
An act for altering the Laws now in Force, relating to the Importation and Exportation of Copper; for repealing certain Duties and Drawbacks on such Importation and Exportation; and for substituting new Duties and Drawbacks in lieu thereof. (Repealed by Statute Law Revision Act 1861 (24 & 25 Vict. c. 101))
Taxation (No. 11) Act 1801 (repealed)	41 Geo. 3. (U.K.) c. 69	27 June 1801
An act for transferring the Receipt and Management of certain Duties on Certificates for wearing Hair Powder, or using Armorial Bearings, from the Commissioners of Stamps to the Commissioners for the Affairs of Taxes; and also for making further Provisions in respect to the said Duties so transferred. (Repealed by House Tax Act 1803 (43 Geo. 3. c. 161))
Insolvent Debtors Relief Act 1801 (repealed)	41 Geo. 3. (U.K.) c. 70	27 June 1801
An Act for the relief of certain insolvent debtors. (Repealed by Statute Law Revision Act 1872 (35 & 36 Vict. c. 63))
Taxation (No. 12) Act 1801 (repealed)	41 Geo. 3. (U.K.) c. 71	27 June 1801
An act for transferring the Receipt and Management of the Duties on Licences for using or exercising the Trade and Business of an Horse Dealer, from the Commissioners of Stamps to the Commissioners for the Affairs of Taxes; and also for making further Provisions in respect to the said Duties so transferred. (Repealed by House Tax Act 1803 (43 Geo. 3. c. 161))
Land Tax Redemption Act 1801 (repealed)	41 Geo. 3. (U.K.) c. 72	27 June 1801
An act for extending the Period of Preference granted and continued by several Acts to Bodies Corporate and Persons for the Redemption of the Land Tax, and to amend an Act of the thirty-eighth Year of the Reign of his present Majesty, (Note: Land Tax Act 1797 (38 Geo. 3. c. 5)) for granting an Aid to his Majesty by a Land Tax. (Repealed by Land Tax Redemption Act 1802 (42 Geo. 3. c. 116))
Certain Parliamentary Grants Act 1801 (repealed)	41 Geo. 3. (U.K.) c. 73	27 June 1801
An act for directing the Application of several Sums granted by Parliament to the Dublin Society, and to the arming Societies in Ireland. (Repealed by Statute Law Revision Act 1872 (35 & 36 Vict. c. 63))
Taxation (No. 13) Act 1801 (repealed)	41 Geo. 3. (U.K.) c. 74	27 June 1801
An act for regulating, until the twentieth Day of May one thousand eight hundred and two, the Allowance of Drawback on the Exportation from Ireland of British Plantation Sugar; and for allowing certain Drawbacks on Sugar exported from Ireland; and for allowing British Plantation Sugar to be warehoused in Ireland. (Repealed by Statute Law Revision Act 1861 (24 & 25 Vict. c. 101))
Taxation (No. 14) Act 1801 (repealed)	41 Geo. 3. (U.K.) c. 75	27 June 1801
An act to permit the Exportation of Tea to Ireland without Payment of any Duty, under certain Restrictions. (Repealed by Customs Law Repeal Act 1825 (6 Geo. 4. c. 105))
Letters of Marque Act 1801 (repealed)	41 Geo. 3. (U.K.) c. 76	27 June 1801
An act to authorize the issuing of Commissions and Letters of Marque and Reprisal against his Majesty's Enemies, to such Ships and Vessels belonging to his Majesty as are or may be employed in the Service of the Boards of Customs and Excise, and other Publick Boards in this Kingdom. (Repealed by Naval Prize Acts Repeal Act 1864 (27 & 28 Vict. c. 23))
Fish, Newfoundland, etc. Act 1801 (repealed)	41 Geo. 3. (U.K.) c. 77	27 June 1801
An act for allowing, until the first Day of August one thousand eight hundred and two, the Importation of certain Fish from Newfoundland and the Coast of Labrador, and for granting a Bounty thereon. (Repealed by Statute Law Revision Act 1872 (35 & 36 Vict. c. 63))
Constables Expenses Act 1801 (repealed)	41 Geo. 3. (U.K.) c. 78	27 June 1801
An act to extend the Powers of an Act, passed in the twenty-seventh Year of the Reign of his late Majesty King George the Second, intituled, "An act for the better securing to Constables and others the Expenses of conveying Offenders to Gaol, and for allowing the Charges of Poor Persons bound to give Evidence against Felons;" (Note: Offenders (Conveyance) Act 1754 (27 Geo. 2. c. 3)) and for allowing to High Constables, in that Part of the United Kingdom called England, their Charges in certain Cases. (Repealed by Police Act 1964 (c. 48))
Public Notaries Act 1801	41 Geo. 3. (U.K.) c. 79	27 June 1801
An Act for the better Regulation of Publick Notaries in England.
Indemnity to Certain Printers Act 1801 (repealed)	41 Geo. 3. (U.K.) c. 80	27 June 1801
An act to indemnify all Persons who have printed, published, or dispersed, or who shall publish or disperse, any Papers printed under the Authority of any Head Officer of State, or of Publick Boards, or other Publick Authorities, from all Penalties incurred by Reason of the Name and Place of Abode of the Printer of such Papers not being printed thereon. (Repealed by Statute Law Revision Act 1861 (24 & 25 Vict. c. 101))
Loans or Exchequer Bills Act 1801 (repealed)	41 Geo. 3. (U.K.) c. 81	27 June 1801
An Act for enabling his Majesty to raise the sum of two millions for the uses and purposes therein mentioned. (Repealed by Statute Law Revision Act 1872 (35 & 36 Vict. c. 63))
Loans or Exchequer Bills (No. 2) Act 1801 (repealed)	41 Geo. 3. (U.K.) c. 82	27 June 1801
An act for raising the Sum of six Millions five hundred thousand Pounds by Loans or Exchequer Bills, for the Service of Great Britain, for the Year one thousand eight hundred and one. (Repealed by Statute Law Revision Act 1872 (35 & 36 Vict. c. 63))
Loans or Exchequer Bills (No. 3) Act 1801 (repealed)	41 Geo. 3. (U.K.) c. 83	27 June 1801
An act for raising the sum of three millions by loans or exchequer bills, for the service of Great Britain, for the year one thousand eight hundred and one. (Repealed by Statute Law Revision Act 1872 (35 & 36 Vict. c. 63))
Appropriation, etc. Act 1801 (repealed)	41 Geo. 3. (U.K.) c. 84	27 June 1801
An act for granting to his Majesty certain Sums of Money out of the Consolidated Fund of Great Britain, and out of the Consolidated Fund of Ireland; for applying certain monies therein mentioned for the Service of the year one thousand eight hundred and one; and for further appropriating the Supplies granted in this Session of Parliament. (Repealed by Statute Law Revision Act 1872 (35 & 36 Vict. c. 63))
Fines by Justices Act 1801 (repealed)	41 Geo. 3. (U.K.) c. 85	27 June 1801
An act for better Payment of Fines and Forfeitures imposed by Justices out of Session, in England. (Repealed by Statute Law Revision Act 1872 (35 & 36 Vict. c. 63) and Statute Law Revision Act 1950 (14 Geo. 6. c. 6))
Probate Duty Act 1801 (repealed)	41 Geo. 3. (U.K.) c. 86	2 July 1801
An act for granting to his Majesty additional Stamp Duties on Cards and Dice; on Probates of Wills; on certain Indentures, Leases, Bonds, or other Deeds; and on Ale Licences. (Repealed by Statute Law Revision Act 1861 (24 & 25 Vict. c. 101) and Finance Act 1975 (c. 7))
Customs Act 1801 (repealed)	41 Geo. 3. (U.K.) c. 87	2 July 1801
An act for granting unto his Majesty certain Duties on Playing Cards imported into Great Britain. (Repealed by Statute Law Revision Act 1861 (24 & 25 Vict. c. 101))
Judges' Lodgings (Ireland) Act 1801 (repealed)	41 Geo. 3. (U.K.) c. 88	2 July 1801
An Act for providing Accommodations in Assize Towns for the Judges in Ireland, where such Accommodations are not already provided. (Repealed by Judicature (Northern Ireland) Act 1978 (c. 23))
Customs (No. 2) Act 1801 (repealed)	41 Geo. 3. (U.K.) c. 89	2 July 1801
An act for repealing the Duty now payable on the Importation of Statues, Wrought Stone, and Marble, and granting another Duty in lieu thereof. (Repealed by Statute Law Revision Act 1861 (24 & 25 Vict. c. 101))
Crown Debts Act 1801	41 Geo. 3. (U.K.) c. 90	2 July 1801
An Act for the more speedy and effectual Recovery of Debts due to his Majesty, his Heirs and Successors, in right of the Crown of the United Kingdom of Great Britain and Ireland; and for the better Administration of Justice within the same.
Excise Act 1801 (repealed)	41 Geo. 3. (U.K.) c. 91	2 July 1801
An act for the better Regulation and Collection of certain Duties of Excise. (Repealed by Statute Law Revision Act 1861 (24 & 25 Vict. c. 101))
Bounties (No. 3) Act 1801 (repealed)	41 Geo. 3. (U.K.) c. 92	2 July 1801
An act to alter the Bounties payable on Wheaten Flour and Indian Corn imported into Ireland; and for providing a Method for recovering the Forfeitures created by an Act of this Session of Parliament (Note: Malting etc. from Grain Act 1801 (41 Geo. 3. (U.K.) c. 16)) to prohibit the making of Malt, and distilling of Spirits from Corn or Grain in Ireland. (Repealed by Statute Law Revision Act 1872 (35 & 36 Vict. c. 63))
Importation (No. 3) Act 1801 (repealed)	41 Geo. 3. (U.K.) c. 93	2 July 1801
An act to continue, until the twenty-fifth Day of March one thousand eight hundred and two, so much of an Act made in the present Session of Parliament, (Note: Importation (No. 2) Act 1801 (41 Geo. 3. (U.K.) c. 41)) as permits British Hops to be imported into Ireland at a low Rate of Duty. (Repealed by Statute Law Revision Act 1872 (35 & 36 Vict. c. 63))
Customs (No. 3) Act 1801 (repealed)	41 Geo. 3. (U.K.) c. 94	2 July 1801
An act to empower the Importers or Proprietors of Rum or Spirits of the British Sugar Plantations to land the same in Ireland, before Payment of the Duties of Excise charged thereon, and to lodge the same in Warehouses at their own Expence, until the twenty-fifth Day of March one thousand eight hundred and eight. (Repealed by Statute Law Revision Act 1872 (35 & 36 Vict. c. 63))
Trade with America Act 1801 (repealed)	41 Geo. 3. (U.K.) c. 95	2 July 1801
An act to facilitate the Trade and Intercourse between Ireland and the United States of America, during the Continuance of the Treaty of Amity, Commerce, and Navigation between his Majesty and the said States. (Repealed by Statute Law Revision Act 1872 (35 & 36 Vict. c. 63))
Prize Act 1801 (repealed)	41 Geo. 3. (U.K.) c. 96	2 July 1801
An act for the better Regulation of his Majesty's Prize Courts in the West Indies and America, and for giving a more speedy and effectual Execution to the Decrees of the Lords Commissioners of Appeals. (Repealed by Naval Prize Acts Repeal Act 1864 (27 & 28 Vict. c. 23))
Fisheries, Continuance of Laws Act 1801 (repealed)	41 Geo. 3. (U.K.) c. 97	2 July 1801
An act to continue several laws relating to encouraging the fisheries carried on at Newfoundland and parts adjacent, from Great Britain, Ireland, and the British dominions in Europe, until the first day of January one thousand eight hundred and three; to the further support and encouragement of the fisheries carried on in the Greenland Seas and Davis's Streights, until the twenty-fifth day of December one thousand eight hundred and two; to the making the port of Saint John's, in the island of Antigua, a free port, until the tenth day of July one thousand eight hundred and five; and to the permitting the importation of goods and commodities from countries in America, belonging to any foreign European sovereign or state, in neutral ships, until the end of the war, and six months after the signing the definitive treaty of peace; for reviving and further continuing, until the twenty-fourth day of June one thousand eight hundred and six, an act made in the twenty ninth year of his late majesty King George the Second, (Note: Exportation Act 1756 (29 Geo. 2. c. 15)) for granting a bounty upon certain species of British and Irish linens exported, and taking off the duties on importation of foreign raw linen yarns made of flax; for reviving, continuing until the fifth day of April one thousand eight hundred and two, and amending an act made in the thirty-ninth and fortieth years of the reign of his present Majesty, (Note: British Fisheries Act 1800 (39 & 40 Geo. 3. c. 85)) for the more effectual encouragement of the British fisheries; and for making perpetual so much of an act made in the twenty-seventh year of the reign of his present Majesty (Note: Exports Act 1787 (27 Geo. 3. c. 31)) as relates to ascertaining the strength of spirits by Clarke's Hydrometer. (Repealed by Sea Fisheries Act 1868 (31 & 32 Vict. c. 45))
Militia Pay (Ireland) Act 1801 (repealed)	41 Geo. 3. (U.K.) c. 98	2 July 1801
An act for defraying the Charge of the Pay and Cloathing of the Militia of Ireland, for one Year from the twenty-fifth Day of March one thousand eight hundred and one. (Repealed by Statute Law Revision Act 1861 (24 & 25 Vict. c. 101))
Fish Act 1801 (repealed)	41 Geo. 3. (U.K.) c. 99	2 July 1801
An act for granting Bounties for taking and bringing Fish to the Cities or London and Westminster, and other Places in the United Kingdom. (Repealed by Sea Fisheries Act 1868 (31 & 32 Vict. c. 45))
Repeal of a Certain Tax Act 1801 (repealed)	41 Geo. 3. (U.K.) c. 100	2 July 1801
An act to repeal the Tax on Salaries, Profits of Employments, Fees, and Pensions in Ireland, of Persons not resident in Ireland for a certain Period. (Repealed by Statute Law Revision Act 1872 (35 & 36 Vict. c. 63))
Controverted Elections Act 1801 (repealed)	41 Geo. 3. (U.K.) c. 101	2 July 1801
An act for regulating, until the first Day of May one thousand eight hundred and two, the Trial of Controverted Elections or Returns of Members to serve in the United Parliament of Great Britain and Ireland, for that Part of the United Kingdom called Ireland; and for regulating the Qualifications of Members to serve in the said United Parliament. (Repealed by Statute Law Revision Act 1872 (35 & 36 Vict. c. 63))
Pluralities of Livings Act 1801 (repealed)	41 Geo. 3. (U.K.) c. 102	2 July 1801
An act to stay, until the twenty-fifth Day of March one thousand eight hundred and two, Proceedings in Actions under the Statute of King Henry the Eighth, (Note: Clergy Act 1529 (21 Hen. 8. c. 13)) for abridging Spiritual Persons from having Pluralities of Livings, and from taking of Ferms. (Repealed by Statute Law Revision Act 1872 (35 & 36 Vict. c. 63))
Malta Act 1801 (repealed)	41 Geo. 3. (U.K.) c. 103	2 July 1801
An Act to empower his Majesty to regulate the trade and commerce to and from the isle of Malta until the signing a definitive treaty of peace; and from thence until six weeks after the next meeting of parliament; and to declare the Isle of Malta to be Part of Europe. (Repealed by Statute Law (Repeals) Act 1986 (c. 12))
Suppression of Rebellion (Ireland) (No. 1) Act 1801 (repealed)	41 Geo. 3. (U.K.) c. 104	2 July 1801
An act for indemnifying such Persons as have acted since the twenty-fifth Day of March one thousand seven hundred and ninety-nine, for the Preservation of the Publick Peace, and Suppression of Insurrections and Rebellion prevailing in several Districts of that Part of the United Kingdom called Ireland. (Repealed by Statute Law Revision Act 1872 (35 & 36 Vict. c. 63))
Witnesses on Petitions Act 1801 (repealed)	41 Geo. 3. (U.K.) c. 105	2 July 1801
An act to authorise the judges to whom petitions for certain bills shall be referred to examine witnesses upon oath. (Repealed by Statute Law Revision Act 1964 (c. 79))
Imprisonment for Debts Abroad Act 1801 (repealed)	41 Geo. 3. (U.K.) c. 106	2 July 1801
An act to secure certain Persons born within the Territories of France, and other Persons therein described, from Imprisonment for Debts contracted in Parts beyond the Seas, other than the Dominions of his Majesty. (Repealed by Statute Law Revision Act 1872 (35 & 36 Vict. c. 63))
Copyright Act 1801 (repealed)	41 Geo. 3. (U.K.) c. 107	2 July 1801
An Act for the further Encouragement of Learning, in the United Kingdom of Great Britain and Ireland, by securing the Copies and Copyright of printed Books, to the Authors of such Books, or their Assigns for the Time herein mentioned. (Repealed by Copyright Act 1842 (5 & 6 Vict. c. 45))
New Forest Act 1801 (repealed)	41 Geo. 3. (U.K.) c. 108	2 July 1801
An act for enabling his Majesty to grant commissions for executing an act made in the thirty-ninth and fortieth years of the reign of his present Majesty, intituled, "An act for the better preservation of timber in the new forest in the county of Southampton, and for ascertaining the boundaries of the said forest and of the lands of the crown within the same." (Note: New Forest Act 1800 (39 & 40 Geo. 3. c. 86)) (Repealed by Wild Creatures and Forest Laws Act 1971 (c. 47))
Inclosure (Consolidation) Act 1801 or the General Inclosure Act 1801 or the Land Inclosure Act 1801 (repealed)	41 Geo. 3. (U.K.) c. 109	2 July 1801
An act for consolidating in one act certain provisions usually inserted in acts of inclosure; and for facilitating the mode of proving the several facts usually required on the passing of such acts. (Repealed by Commons Act 1899 (62 & 63 Vict. c. 30))

=== Local acts ===
Short title	Citation	Royal assent
Long title
Tadcaster and Otley Road Act 1801	41 Geo. 3. (U.K.) c. i	24 March 1801
An Act for continuing for twenty-one years, and from thence to the end of the then next session of parliament, the term, and altering the powers, of two acts, passed in the twenty-sixth year of the reign of his late majesty King George the Second, (Note: Tadcaster and Otley Road Act 1753 (26 Geo. 2. c. 64)) and in the eleventh year of the reign of his present Majesty, (Note: Tadcaster and Otley Road Act 1771 (11 Geo. 3. c. 64)) for repairing and widening the road from the town of Tadcaster, through Collingham, Harewood, Arthington, and Pool, to the town of Utley, in the west riding of the county of York.
Chesterfield and Hernstone Lane Head Turnpike Roads Act 1801 (repealed)	41 Geo. 3. (U.K.) c. ii	24 March 1801
An act to continue for twenty-one years, and from thence to the end of the then next session of parliament, the term, and alter and enlarge the powers, of two acts, passed in the thirty-second year of the reign of his late majesty King George the Second, (Note: Derbyshire Roads Act 1758 (32 Geo. 2. c. 43)) and the nineteenth year of the reign of his present Majesty, (Note: Derbyshire Roads Act 1779 (19 Geo. 3. c. 87)) for repairing and widening the road from Chesterfield to the turnpike road at Hernstone Lane Head, and several other roads in the said acts mentioned, all in the county of Derby. (Repealed by Chesterfield and Hernstone Lane Head Turnpike Roads Act 1864 (27 & 28 Vict. c. lxxiv))
Aberdeenshire Canal Act 1801	41 Geo. 3. (U.K.) c. iii	24 March 1801
An Act for better enabling the company of proprietors of the Aberdeenshire canal navigation to complete the same.
Boroughbridge and Durham Road Act 1801 (repealed)	41 Geo. 3. (U.K.) c. iv	24 March 1801
An act for continuing and amending an act, passed in the thirty-second year of the reign of his present Majesty, (Note: Boroughbridge and Durham Road Act 1792 (32 Geo. 3. c. 118)) for repairing the road from Boroughbridge in the county of York, to the city of Durham, and for more effectually repairing the said road. (Repealed by Boroughbridge and Durham Road Act 1812 (52 Geo. 3. c. xxxviii))
Roads in Carmarthenshire Act 1801	41 Geo. 3. (U.K.) c. v	2 April 1801
An Act for amending, widening, and repairing, several Roads in the County of Carmarthen.
Sudbury and Bury St. Edmunds Road Act 1801 (repealed)	41 Geo. 3. (U.K.) c. vi	2 April 1801
An act for continuing the term, and rendering more effectual, two acts, made in the second (Note: Sudbury to Bury St. Edmunds Road Act 1762 (2 Geo. 3. c. 75)) and eleventh (Note: Sudbury to Bury St. Edmunds Road Act 1771 (11 Geo. 3. c. 58)) years of the reign of his present Majesty, for repairing and widening the high road leading from the north end of Ballingdon Bridge, in Sudbury, in the county of Suffolk, to the south gate in Bury Saint Edmunds, in the said county; and also for repairing and widening the high road leading from the place where the said south gate formerly stood, to the place where the north gate in Bury Saint Edmunds formerly stood. (Repealed by Sudbury and Bury St. Edmunds Road Act 1826 (7 Geo. 4. c. cxxxi))
Canterbury Cattle Market Act 1801 (repealed)	41 Geo. 3. (U.K.) c. vii	2 April 1801
An Act for enlarging improving and regulating the Cattle Market, within the City and County of the City of Canterbury. (Repealed by County of Kent Act 1981 (c. xviii))
Road from the Botley Turnpike Road Act 1801 (repealed)	41 Geo. 3. (U.K.) c. viii	2 April 1801
An act for making and maintaining a convenient carriage road from the Botley turnpike road, on Curdridge Common, in the parish of Bishops Waltham, to join the Gosport turnpike road, at or near Filmerhill, in the parish of Westmeon, with a branch from the said road, on Corhampton Down, to the village of Corhampton, all in the county of Southampton. (Repealed by Road from the Botley Turnpike Road Act 1823 (4 Geo. 4. c. xlvi))
Epsom, Ewell, Tooting and Thames Ditton Roads Act 1801 (repealed)	41 Geo. 3. (U.K.) c. ix	2 April 1801
An act for continuing for twenty-one years, and from thence to the end of the then next session or parliament, the term, and altering and enlarging the powers of two acts, passed in the twenty-eighth year of the reign of his late majesty King George the Second, (Note: Surrey Roads Act 1755 (28 Geo. 2. c. 57)) and the twentieth year of the reign of his present Majesty, (Note: Surrey Roads Act 1780 (20 Geo. 3. c. 100)) for amending, widening, and keeping in repair, the roads from Epsom, through Ewell, to Tooting, and from Ewell to Kingston-upon-Thames and Thames Ditton, in the county of Surrey; and for amending, widening, and keeping in repair, the road from the turnpike road at Ewell, across Ewell common fields, to the Ryegate turnpike road on Borough Heath, in the said county. (Repealed by Road from Epsom to Tooting Act 1839 (2 & 3 Vict. c. iv))
Launceston (Cornwall) Roads Act 1801 (repealed)	41 Geo. 3. (U.K.) c. x	2 April 1801
An act for continuing and amending two acts, severally passed in the thirty-third year of the reign of his late majesty King George the Second, (Note: Launceston Roads Act 1759 (33 Geo. 2. c. 59)) and in the twenty-first year of the reign of his present Majesty, (Note: Launceston Roads Act 1781 (21 Geo. 3. c. 86)) for repairing and improving several roads leading to the borough of Launceston, in the county of Cornwall, and also for extending the provisions of the said acts to the road leading from the west gate, under Madford, in the borough of Launceston aforesaid, by Docacre, to the north gate, in the same borough. (Repealed by Launceston Turnpike Roads Act 1835 (5 & 6 Will. 4. c. lxv))
Dover and Sandwich Road Act 1801	41 Geo. 3. (U.K.) c. xi	2 April 1801
An act for altering, widening, and repairing the road leading from the town and port of Dover to the town and port of Sandwich, through the parish of Waldershare, and also the road from the present turnpike road leading from Dover to Barham downs, up Kersney Court hill, to the parish of Whitfield otherwise Beausfield, in the county of Kent.
Roads to Bridgwater Act 1801 (repealed)	41 Geo. 3. (U.K.) c. xii	2 April 1801
An ac to continue for twenty-one years, and from thence to the end of the then next session of parliament, the term, and alter and enlarge the powers of two acts, passed in the thirty-second year of the reign of his late majesty King George the Second, (Note: Somerset and Gloucester Roads Act 1758 (32 Geo. 2. c. 40)) and in the nineteenth year of the reign of his present Majesty, (Note: Bridgwater Roads Act 1779 (19 Geo. 3. c. 100)) for repairing several roads leading to the town of Bridgewater, in the county of Somerset, and other roads therein mentioned, so far as the said acts relate to the said roads leading to the said town. (Repealed by Bridgwater (Somerset) Roads Act 1822 (3 Geo. 4. c. lxv))
Road from Fisherton Bridge to Willoughby Hedge and West Knowle Turnpike Road Act 1801	41 Geo. 3. (U.K.) c. xiii	2 April 1801
An act to continue the term, and alter and amend the powers of three acts, passed in the first, (Note: Wilts Roads Act 1760 (1 Geo. 3. c. 37)) second, (Note: Wilts Roads (No. 2) Act 1762 (2 Geo. 3. c. 51)) and twentieth (Note: Wiltshire Roads Act 1780 (20 Geo. 3. c. 82)) years of the reign of his present majesty King George the Third, for amending, widening, and keeping in repair the road leading from Fisherton Bridge (Note: Fisherton Bridge, carrying Fisherton Street across the River Avon, Salisbury, Wiltshire. 51°04′08″N 1°47′54″W) to the turnpike road at Willoughby Hedge, (Note: Willoughby Hedge is at the junction of the A303 and B3089 roads, north of West Knoyle, Wiltshire. 51°06′04″N 2°11′15″W) in West Knoyle, and several other roads therein mentioned, in the county of Wilts.
Peterborough and Wellingborough Road Act 1801 (repealed)	41 Geo. 3. (U.K.) c. xiv	2 April 1801
An act for continuing for twenty-one years, and from thence to the end of the then next session of parliament, the term, and altering and enlarging the powers of two acts, passed in the twenty-seventh year of the reign of his late majesty King George the Second, (Note: Northamptonshire Roads Act 1754 (27 Geo. 2. c. 23)) and the thirteenth year of the reign of his present Majesty, (Note: Northants Roads Act 1773 (13 Geo. 3. c. 91)) for repairing and widening the road from the city of Peterborough, through Oundle and Thrapston, to Wellingborough, in the county of Northampton, and for repairing and widening several other roads near or adjoining thereto. (Repealed by Peterborough and Wellingborough Road Act 1823 (4 Geo. 4. c. viii))
Arundel Tythes Act 1801	41 Geo. 3. (U.K.) c. xv	2 April 1801
An act for enlarging the powers or authorities given by an act, passed in the thirty-seventh year of the reign of his present Majesty, (Note: Arundel Castle Estate Act 1797 (37 Geo. 3. c. 39 Pr.)) intituled, "An act for the enfranchisement of copyhold and customary lands, parcel of the manor of Arundel, and other manors entailed by the act of parliament of the third of Charles the First, (Note: Earl of Arundel's Dignity and Estate Act 1627 (3 Cha. 1. c. 4 Pr.)) and for the sale of tythes also entailed by the said act," in order to facilitate the sale of the tythes therein mentioned.
Road from Burford to Dancy's Fancy Act 1801 (repealed)	41 Geo. 3. (U.K.) c. xvi	18 April 1801
An act for continuing for twenty-one years, and from thence to the end of the then next session of parliament, the term, and altering and enlarging the powers of two acts, passed in the twenty-sixth year of the reign of his late majesty King George the Second, (Note: Oxford and Gloucester Roads Act 1753 (26 Geo. 2. c. 70)) and in the twentieth year of the reign of his present Majesty, (Note: Burford to Preston Road Act 1780 (20 Geo. 3. c. 76)) for repairing and widening the road from the hand and post in Upton Field, in the parish of Burford, in the county of Oxford, to a place in the parish of Preston, in the county of Gloucester, called Dancy's Fancy. (Repealed by Statute Law (Repeals) Act 2013 (c. 2))
Selkirk County Roads Act 1801 (repealed)	41 Geo. 3. (U.K.) c. xvii	30 April 1801
An Act for levying Conversion Money in Lieu of Statute Labour, and otherwise regulating, making and repairing the High Roads in the County of Selkirk. (Repealed by Selkirkshire Roads Act 1867 (30 & 31 Vict. c. xlvii))
Bricker's Barn (Corsham, Wiltshire) and Batheaston Bridge Road Act 1801 (repealed)	41 Geo. 3. (U.K.) c. xviii	30 April 1801
An act for continuing for twenty-one years, and from thence to the end of the then next session of parliament, the term, and altering and enlarging the powers of two acts, passed in the thirtieth year of the reign of his late majesty King George the Second, (Note: Wiltshire and Somerset Roads Act 1757 (30 Geo. 2. c. 46)) and the nineteenth year of the reign of his present Majesty, (Note: Corsham to Bath Easton Bridge Road Act 1779 (19 Geo. 3. c. 112)) for amending, widening, making commodious, and keeping in repair the road from the Cross Keys, otherwise Bricker's Barn, in the parish of Corsham, in the county of Wilts, to Bath Easton Bridge, in the county of Somerset. (Repealed by Road from Bricker's Barn to the Kingsdown and Batheaston Road Act 1819 (59 Geo. 3. c. xlv))
Stratford-upon-Avon and Bradley Brook, and Alcester and Bromsgrove Roads Act 1801 (repealed)	41 Geo. 3. (U.K.) c. xix	30 April 1801
An act for continuing for twenty-one years, and from thence to the end of the then session of parliament, the term, and altering and enlarging the powers of two acts, passed in the twenty-seventh year of the reign of his late majesty King George the Second, (Note: Warwick and Worcester Roads Act 1754 (27 Geo. 2. c. 36)) and the twenty-first year of the reign of his present Majesty, (Note: Warwick and Worcester Roads Act 1781 (21 Geo. 3. c. 88)) for repairing and widening the roads from the borough of Stratford upon Avon, in the county of Warwick, through Alcester, in the said county, and Feckenham, to a place called Bradley Brook, in the county of Worcester, and from Alcester, through Great Coughton and Crabs Cross, in the said county of Warwick, and through Hewell Lane, and Burcott, to the cross of hands, on a common called The Leekhay, and out of Hewell Lane, through Church Lane and Tutnell, to Bromsgrove, in the said county of Worcester. (Repealed by Stratford-upon-Avon and Bradley Brook Roads Act 1821 (1 & 2 Geo. 4. c. xiii))
Road between Cockermouth and Workington Act 1801 (repealed)	41 Geo. 3. (U.K.) c. xx	30 April 1801
An act for continuing for twenty-one years, and from thence to the end of the then next session of parliament, the term and powers of two acts, made in the twenty-sixth year of the reign of his late majesty King George the Second, (Note: Cockermouth and Workington Road Act 1753 (26 Geo. 2. c. 49)) and the nineteenth year of the reign of his present Majesty, (Note: Cockermouth and Workington Road Act 1779 (19 Geo. 3. c. 105)) for repairing the road from the city of Carlisle, in the county of Cumberland, to the market and sea port town of Workington, in the said county, so far as the same relate to the road between the town of Cockermouth and Workington aforesaid. (Repealed by Cockermouth and Workington Road Act 1823 (4 Geo. 4. c. xxiii))
Hickling Inclosure and Drainage Act 1801	41 Geo. 3. (U.K.) c. xxi	30 April 1801
An act for dividing, allotting, inclosing, draining, and preserving the open fields, marsh lands, commons, fens, and waste grounds, within the parish of Hickling, in the county of Norfolk.
Burgh and Billockby Inclosure and Drainage Act 1801	41 Geo. 3. (U.K.) c. xxii	30 April 1801
An act for dividing, allotting, inclosing, draining, and preserving the open fields, marsh lands, commons, fens, and waste grounds, within the parishes of Burgh and Billockby, in the county of Norfolk.
Kennet and Avon Canal Act 1801	41 Geo. 3. (U.K.) c. xxiii	21 May 1801
An Act for enabling the Company of Proprietors of the Kennet and Avon Canal Navigation, to complete the same, and for amending the several Acts passed for making the said Canal.
Deanburn Bridge and Cornhill, and Swinton Roads Act 1801 (repealed)	41 Geo. 3. (U.K.) c. xxiv	21 May 1801
An act to enlarge the term and powers of two acts, made in the thirty-third year of the reign of his late Majesty, (Note: Durham Roads Act 1759 (33 Geo. 2. c. 56)) and the twenty-first year of the reign of his present Majesty, (Note: Berwick Roads Act 1781 (21 Geo. 3. c. 91)) so far as relates to the roads from Deanburn Bridge, through Greenlaw, and part of the Jedburgh road, by Lauder, in the county of Berwick, to Cornhill, in the county of Durham, and for repairing and amending the roads from Orange Lane, to Swinton, and from Coldstream, by Swinton mill, to Mount Pleasant, in the said county of Berwick. (Repealed by Road from Deanburn to Cornhill and Coldstream Bridge Act 1825 (6 Geo. 4. c. xli))
Road from Inchbelly Bridge to Glasgow Act 1801	41 Geo. 3. (U.K.) c. xxv	21 May 1801
An act for enlarging the term and powers of so much of an act, passed in the thirty-fifth year of his present Majesty's reign, (Note: Glasgow Roads Act 1795 (35 Geo. 3. c. 155)) for repairing the road from Inchbelly Bridge to Glasgow, and certain roads branching from the same, as relates to the said road from Inchbelly Bridge to Glasgow, and to the road branching from the aforesaid road from Inchbelly Bridge to Glasgow, and leading over Garngad Hill to Provan Mill, and to the present turnpike road leading to Cumbernauld.
Tiverton Roads Act 1801 (repealed)	41 Geo. 3. (U.K.) c. xxvi	21 May 1801
An act for continuing for twenty-one years, and from thence to the end of the then next session of parliament, the term, and altering the powers of two acts, passed in the thirty-first year of the reign of his late majesty King George the Second, (Note: Tiverton Roads Act 1757 (31 Geo. 2. c. 49)) and in the seventh year of the reign of his present Majesty, (Note: Tiverton Roads Act 1766 (7 Geo. 3. c. 62)) for amending several roads leading from the town of Tiverton in the county of Devon. (Repealed by Tiverton Roads Act 1811 (51 Geo. 3. c. xlviii))
Birmingham and Stratford-upon-Avon Road Act 1801	41 Geo. 3. (U.K.) c. xxvii	21 May 1801
An act for continuing for twenty-one years, and from thence to the end of the then next session of parliament, and for amending, and making more effectual, four several acts, made in the twelfth year of the reign of King George the First, (Note: Birmingham to Edgehill Road Act 1725 (12 Geo. 1. c. 6)) in the eighteenth (Note: Birmingham to Edgehill Road Act 1744 (18 Geo. 2. c. 32)) and thirty-first (Note: Birmingham to Edgehill Road Act 1757 (31 Geo. 2. c. 58)) years of the reign of his late majesty King George the Second, and in the eleventh year of the reign of his present Majesty, (Note: Birmingham to Stratford Road Act 1771 (11 Geo. 3. c. 74)) for repairing the roads from Birmingham, through Warwick, to Warmington, and from Birmingham, through Stratford upon Avon, to Edgehill, in the county of Warwick, so far as the same relate to the road from Birmingham, through Stratford upon Avon, to Stratford Bridge, in the said county.
Road from Macclesfield to the Buxton Turnpike Road Act 1801 (repealed)	41 Geo. 3. (U.K.) c. xxviii	21 May 1801
An act to continue for twenty-one years, and from thence to the end of the then next session of parliament, the term, and alter and enlarge the powers of two acts, passed in the thirty-second year of the reign of his late majesty King George the Second, (Note: Macclesfield and Buxton Road Act 1758 (32 Geo. 2. c. 41)) and in the twentieth year of the reign of his present Majesty, (Note: Macclesfield to Buxton Road Act 1780 (20 Geo. 3. c. 91)) for repairing and widening the road from the cross at Broken Cross, in Macclesfield, in the county of Chester, to the turnpike road at Buxton, in the county of Derby; and for making and keeping in repair certain branches of road to communicate with the said Macclesfield road. (Repealed by Road from Macclesfield to the Buxton Turnpike Road Act 1821 (1 & 2 Geo. 4. c. xxxvi))
Popham Lane, Winchester and Romsey Roads Act 1801 (repealed)	41 Geo. 3. (U.K.) c. xxix	21 May 1801
An act for enlarging the term and powers of several acts, made in the thirty-second year of the reign of his late Majesty King George the Second, (Note: Dorset Roads Act 1758 (32 Geo. 2. c. 50)) and the second, (Note: Hants and Dorset Roads Act 1762 (2 Geo. 3. c. 57)) fifth, (Note: Hants Roads Act 1765 (5 Geo. 3. c. 95)) and nineteenth (Note: Southampton Roads Act 1779 (19 Geo. 3. c. 101)) years of the reign of his present Majesty, for repairing and widening the roads from Oxdown Gate, in Popham Lane, to the city of Winchester, and from the said city, through Hursley, to Chandler's Ford, and from Hursley aforesaid to the turnpike at Romsey, and from the said turnpike road, through Ringwood, in the county of Southampton, to Longham Bridge and Winborne Minster, in the county oi Dorset; and for amending and widening the road from Ringwood Gate, in the said county of Southampton, to Woolsbridge, and from a street called The Hundred, at Romsey, through Chilworth, to the river at Swathling, in the said county. (Repealed by Winchester Roads Act 1823 (4 Geo. 4. c. cxx))
Sculcoates Improvement Act 1801	41 Geo. 3. (U.K.) c. xxx	21 May 1801
An act for paving, cleansing, lighting, watching, and regulating the streets, squares, lanes, and other publick passages and places, within the parish of Sculcoates, in the east riding of the county of York; and for removing and preventing nuisances, annoyances, encroachments and obstructions; and for licensing and regulating hackney coaches, chairs, porters, coal carriers, and water carriers, trucks, carts, and other carriages, within the said parish.
Grand Surrey Canal Act 1801	41 Geo. 3. (U.K.) c. xxxi	21 May 1801
An act for making and maintaining a navigable canal from the river Thames at or near a place called Wilkinson's Gun Wharf, in the parish of Saint Mary at Rotherhithe in the county of Surrey, to the town of Mitcham, in the parish of Mitcham, in the said county; and also divers collateral cuts or branches communicating from the same to certain parishes and places within the counties of Surrey and Kent.
Hull and Leven Canal Act 1801	41 Geo. 3. (U.K.) c. xxxii	21 May 1801
An act for enabling Charlotta Bethell, widow, to make and maintain a navigable canal from the river Hull, at a point in the parish of Leven, near the boundary between Eske and Leven Carrs, in the east riding of the county of York to Leven bridge, in the said riding.
Surrey Railways Act 1801 (repealed)	41 Geo. 3. (U.K.) c. xxxiii	21 May 1801
An act for making and maintaining a railway from the town of Wandsworth to the town of Croydon, with a collateral branch into the parish of Carshalton, and a navigable communication between the river Thames and the said railway at Wandsworth, all in the county of Surrey. (Repealed by Surrey Iron Railway Act 1846 (9 & 10 Vict. c. cccxxxiii))
Upwell, Outwell, Denver and Wellney Drainage Act 1801	41 Geo. 3. (U.K.) c. xxxiv	21 May 1801
An act for more effectually draining and improving certain fen lands within the manors and parishes of Upwell and Outwell, and in the parishes of Denver and Welney, in the isle of Ely, and counties of Cambridge and Norfolk.
North Kyme Drainage Act 1801	41 Geo. 3. (U.K.) c. xxxv	21 May 1801
An act to alter amend and render more effectual, an act, passed in the twenty-eighth year of the reign of his present majesty King George the Third, intituled, "An act for more effectually draining and preserving certain fen lands and low grounds in the manor or township of North Kyme, in the county of Lincoln." (Note: North Kyme Drainage Act 1788 (28 Geo. 3. c. 14))
Roads from Nether Bridge and from Millthrop (Westmorland) Act 1801 (repealed)	41 Geo. 3. (U.K.) c. xxxvi	21 May 1801
An act for continuing for twenty-one years, and from thence to the end of the then next session of parliament, the term, and enlarging the powers, of two acts, passed in the thirty-second year of the reign of his late majesty King George the Second, (Note: Westmorland Roads Act 1758 (32 Geo. 2. c. 69)) and in the twentieth year of the reign of his present Majesty, (Note: Westmorland Roads Act 1780 (20 Geo. 3. c. 88)) for repairing, amending, and widening, the roads from the south west end of Nether Bridge, (Note: Nether Bridge, Kendal, Cumbria, where the A6 road meets the A65 road. 54°19′15″N 2°44′42″W) in the county of Westmorland, by Sizergh Fell Side (Note: Sizergh Fell, Cumbria.) to Leven's Bridge, (Note: Levens Bridge, which takes the A6 road across the River Kent, north of Levens Hall, Cumbria. 54°15′37″N 2°46′30″W) and from thence through the town of Milthrop (Note: Milnthorpe, Cumbria.) to Dixes, and from the town of Milthrop aforesaid to Hang Bridge, (Note: Hang Bridge, on the B6384 road between Milnthorpe and Holme, Cumbria. 54°12′53″N 2°44′59″W) and from thence to join the Heron Syke turnpike road at the guide post near Clawthrop Hall (Note: A former junction on the A6070 road north of Clawthorpe Hall, Clawthorpe, Cumbria. The former road from Milnthorpe was removed when the M6 motorway was built. 54°11′38″N 2°43′21″W) in the county aforesaid. (Repealed by Road from Nether Bridge and from Millthrop (Westmorland) Act 1822 (3 Geo. 4. c. xii))
New Windsor, Longford and Datchet Roads Act 1801	41 Geo. 3. (U.K.) c. xxxvii	21 May 1801
An act for making and maintaining a road from the town of New Windsor in the county of Berks, into the London road, at or near a bridge called High Bridge, near Longford in the county of Middlesex; and for amending, widening, and keeping in repair, the road leading from and out of the said road at Southley in the parish of Datchet, to the village of Datchet in the county of Bucks.
Donhead St. Andrew and Nether Compton Road (Wiltshire) Act 1801 (repealed)	41 Geo. 3. (U.K.) c. xxxviii	21 May 1801
An act for more effectually amending, widening, improving, and keeping in repair, the road from the top of White Sheet Hill, in the parish of Donhead Saint Andrew in the county of Wilts, through the towns of Shaftesbury, Milborne Port, and Sherborne, in the counties of Dorset and Somerset, to the half way house in the parish of Nether, otherwise Lower Compton, in the said county of Dorset, and several other roads near the towns of Shaftesbury and Sherborne aforesaid. (Repealed by Donhead St. Andrew and Nether Compton Road Act 1822 (3 Geo. 4. c. lxii))
Birmingham Improvement Act 1801 (repealed)	41 Geo. 3. (U.K.) c. xxxix	21 May 1801
An Act to alter and enlarge the Powers of Two Acts, passed in the Ninth (Note: Birmingham Improvement Act 1769 (9 Geo. 3. c. 83)) and Thirteenth (Note: Birmingham Improvement Act 1772 (13 Geo. 3. c. 36)) Years of the Reign of His present Majesty, for laying open and widening certain Ways, Passages, Streets and Places, within the Town of Birmingham; and for cleansing and lighting the Streets, Lanes, Ways and Passages there, and for other Purposes in the said Acts mentioned; and also for regulating Hackney Coaches and Chairs, and the Drivers of all Carriages, in the said Town; for laying open and widening certain other Streets and Places there; for further regulating the Police of the said Town, and the Manner of laying out and paving new Streets there, and for other purposes. (Repealed by Birmingham Improvement Act 1812 (52 Geo. 3. c. cxiii))
Highgate House and Hampstead Roads Act 1801 (repealed)	41 Geo. 3. (U.K.) c. xl	21 May 1801
An act to continue for twenty-one years, and from thence to the end of the then next session of parliament, the term and alter and amend the powers of an act made in the sixteenth year of the reign of his present Majesty, (Note: Highgate and Hampstead Roads Act 1776 (16 Geo. 3. c. 76)) intituled "An act to continue and render more effectual several acts of parliament for repairing the highways leading to Highgate Gatehouse and Hampstead, and other roads in the said acts mentioned, in the county of Middlesex; and also to continue and render more effectual, an act (Note: Highgate and Hampstead Roads Act 1756 (29 Geo. 2. c. 88)) to enable the respective trustees of the turnpike roads leading to Highgate Gatehouse and Hampstead, and from Saint Giles's Pound, to Kilbourne, to make a new road from the great northern road at Islington to the Edgeware road near Paddington, so far as the same is by the said act directed to be under the care and management of the trustees of the said first-mentioned acts; and for making a road from the said new road near Queen's Row, to Bagnigge Wash, and for watching, lighting, and watering the said roads." (Repealed by Roads to Highgate House and Hampstead Act 1821 (1 & 2 Geo. 4. c. cx))
Thirsk, Hutton Moor and Masham Road Act 1801 (repealed)	41 Geo. 3. (U.K.) c. xli	21 May 1801
An act for continuing, until the end of the first session of parliament, which shall commence after the fifth day of July one thousand eight hundred and twenty-two, two acts severally passed in the twenty-eighth year of the reign of his late majesty King George the Second, (Note: Thirsk, Hutton Moor and Masham Road Act 1755 (28 Geo. 2. c. 51)) and in the nineteenth year of the reign of his present Majesty, (Note: Thirsk, Hutton Moor and Masham Road Act 1779 (19 Geo. 3. c. 80)) for repairing the road from Thirsk, over Skipton Bridge to Baldersby Gate, adjoining to Hutton Moor, and a branch from the said road at or near Skipton Bridge aforesaid, through Ainderby, Quernhow, and Nosterfield to Masham, in the north riding of the county of York. (Repealed by Thirsk and Masham Road Act 1821 (1 & 2 Geo. 4. c. vii))
Road from Cirencester to Cricklade Act 1801 (repealed)	41 Geo. 3. (U.K.) c. xlii	21 May 1801
An act for continuing for twenty-one years, and from thence to the end of the then next session of parliament, the term, and enlarging the powers of two acts, passed in the thirty-first year of the reign of his late majesty King George the Second, (Note: Cirencester to Cricklade Road Act 1757 (31 Geo. 2. c. 61)) and in the nineteenth year of the reign of his present Majesty, (Note: Cirencester to Cricklade Road Act 1779 (19 Geo. 3. c. 116)) for repairing the road from Cirencester in the county of Gloucester, to Cricklade in the county of Wilts, and for amending, improving, and keeping in repair, the road leading from near the wharf at Latton, (Note: Latton Wharf was on the former Thames and Severn Canal, between Cricklade and Latton, Wiltshire. The site is now Wharf Farm. 51°38′58″N 1°51′28″W) in the said county of Wilts, to the town bridge (Note: Town Bridge, Cricklade, Wiltshire. The current bridge was built in 1812, and it marks the upper limits of the navigation rights on the River Thames. 51°38′40″N 1°51′17″W) in Cricklade aforesaid. (Repealed by Road from Cirencester to Cricklade Act 1822 (3 Geo. 4. c. ci))
Guildford to Farnham Road Act 1801 (repealed)	41 Geo. 3. (U.K.) c. xliii	21 May 1801
An act for continuing for twenty-one years, and from thence to the end of the then next session of parliament, the term, and altering and enlarging the powers of two acts, passed in the thirty-first year of the reign of his late majesty King George the Second, (Note: Guildford to Farnham Road Act 1757 (31 Geo. 2. c. 78)) and the twentieth year of the reign of his present Majesty, (Note: Guildford to Farnham Road Act 1780 (20 Geo. 3. c. 96)) for repairing and widening the road from the town of Guldeford to the directing post near the town of Farnham in the county of Surrey. (Repealed by Statute Law (Repeals) Act 2013 (c. 2))
Roads from Donington High Bridge Act 1801 (repealed)	41 Geo. 3. (U.K.) c. xliv	21 May 1801
An act to continue for twenty-one years, and from thence to the end of the then next session of parliament, the term, and alter and enlarge the powers of two acts, passed in the thirty-first year of the reign of his late majesty King George the Second, (Note: Lincoln Roads Act 1757 (31 Geo. 2. c. 50)) and the eighteenth year of the reign of his present majesty King George the Third, (Note: Lincoln Roads Act 1778 (18 Geo. 3. c. 104)) for repairing and widening the roads from Donnington High Bridge to Hale Drove, and to the eighth mile stone in the parish of Wigtoft, and to Langret Ferry in the county of Lincoln. (Repealed by Roads from Donington High Bridge Act 1822 (3 Geo. 4. c. ix))
Roads from Dover to Barham Downs and Sandgate Act 1801 (repealed)	41 Geo. 3. (U.K.) c. xlv	21 May 1801
An act for enlarging the term and altering the powers of two acts, one made in the twenty-sixth year of the reign of his late majesty King George the Second, (Note: Kent Roads Act 1753 (26 Geo. 2. c. 68)) and the other made in the fourth year of the reign of his present Majesty, (Note: Kent Roads Act 1764 (4 Geo. 3. c. 78)) for amending, widening, and repairing the roads leading from Dover to Barham Downs, and from Cowgate and Archcliff Fort (Note: Archcliffe Fort, Dover. 51°6′54″N 1°18′24″E) in Dover, through Folkestone to the town of Hythe in the county of Kent; and for repealing so much thereof as requires the trustees therein named to keep in repair the several roads leading from Archcliff Fort in Dover, to Folkestone, and from the parish of Folkestone to Hythe. (Repealed by Roads from Dover to Barham Downs and Sandgate Act 1823 (4 Geo. 4. c. lxxxi))
Downham Market, Wimbotsham and Bexwell Inclosures Act 1801	41 Geo. 3. (U.K.) c. xlvi	21 May 1801
An act for dividing, allotting, and inclosing certain open fields and other lands within the several parishes of Downham Market, Wimbotsham, and Bexwell, in the county of Norfolk.
Maidsmorton, Gawcott and Prebend-End Inclosures Act 1801	41 Geo. 3. (U.K.) c. xlvii	21 May 1801
An act for dividing and inclosing the open and common fields, meadows, pastures, and waste grounds, within the manor and parish of Maidsmorton, and the hamlets of Gawcott and Prebend-End, in the parish of Buckingham, in the county of Bucks.
Westmanside in East Hendred Inclosure Act 1801	41 Geo. 3. (U.K.) c. xlviii	21 May 1801
An act for dividing allotting, and laying in severalty, the open and common fields, common meadows, common pastures, downs, and other commonable and wastelands, situate, lying, and being in that part of the parish of East Hendred, which is in the hundred of Wantage, in the county of Berks, called Westmanside, except such part of the said common meadows as lieth in a meadow called Fox Mead, or Ardington Mead.
Roads in Dumfries and Kirkcudbright Act 1801 (repealed)	41 Geo. 3. (U.K.) c. xlix	20 June 1801
An act for repairing and widening the roads from Dumfries to Moffat, and from Grateney, by Annan, Dunfries, and Sanquhar, to the confines of the county of Ayr, and several other roads in the counties of Dumfries and Kirkcudbright. (Repealed by Dumfriesshire Roads Act 1809 (49 Geo. 3. c. clx))
Staplecross Roads Act 1801 (repealed)	41 Geo. 3. (U.K.) c. l	20 June 1801
An act to amend and widen the roads leading from Staplecross, in the parish of Ewhurst, to Hornscross, in the parish of Northiam, and from Hornscross aforesaid to the turnpike road near Brickwall House, in the parish of Northiam, and from Hornscross aforesaid to the turnpike road near the Windmill, in the parish of Beckley, and also the road from Staplecross aforesaid to Bodiam Bridge, in the parish of Bodiam, and from thence through the parishes of Bodiam aforesaid and Salehurst, to the turnpike road at Silver Hill, in the said parish of Salehurst, all in the county of Sussex. (Repealed by Staplecross (Sussex) Roads Act 1823 (4 Geo. 4. c. lxv))
Greenock Harbour and Improvement Act 1801	41 Geo. 3. (U.K.) c. li	20 June 1801
An act to amend two acts, made in the thirteenth (Note: Greenock Water Supply, etc. Act 1772 (13 Geo. 3. c. 28)) and twenty-ninth (Note: Greenock Improvement Act 1789 (29 Geo. 3. c. 43)) years of the reign of his present Majesty, for making more commodious the harbours of the town of Greenock, and for other purposes mentioned in the said acts; for watching the said town, and better supplying the same with water; for regulating the fares of coachman, chairmen, porters and carters plying in the said town, and of pilots, watermen, and jobbers employed in the said harbours, and on the river Clyde, and for feuing out the glebe of the said town.
Port Glasgow Harbour Act 1801 (repealed)	41 Geo. 3. (U.K.) c. lii	20 June 1801
An act for explaining, altering, and amending, an act, made in the twelfth year of the reign of his present Majesty, (Note: Port Glasgow Harbour Act 1772 (12 Geo. 3. c. 16)) for deepening, cleansing, scouring, preserving, and maintaining the harbour of Port Glasgow, and for other purposes mentioned in the said act. (Repealed by Port Glasgow Harbour Consolidation Act 1864 (27 & 28 Vict. c. cxl))
Rye Harbour Act 1801	41 Geo. 3. (U.K.) c. liii	20 June 1801
An act for more effectually improving and maintaining the old harbour of Rye in the county of Sussex.
Sheerness Pier and Improvement Act 1801	41 Geo. 3. (U.K.) c. liv	20 June 1801
An act for building a pier at Sheerness, in the isle of Sheppy, in the county of Kent; for ascertaining, imposing, and recovering certain duties, for the supporting, maintaining and keeping in repair the said pier; for paving, repairing, cleansing, lighting, watching, watering, and improving the highways, streets, lanes, and other publick passages and places, within that part of the parish of Minster in the said isle of Sheppy (which lieth near his Majesty's dock yard and garrison of Sheerness) called Blue Town and Mile Town; and for preventing nuisances, annoyances and obstructions therein.
Bursledon Bridge and Roads Act 1801 (repealed)	41 Geo. 3. (U.K.) c. lv	20 June 1801
An act to enable the company of proprietors of Bursledon Bridge and roads, to raise a further sum of money to complete the said bridge and roads. (Repealed by Southampton County Council (Bursledon Bridge) Act 1930 (20 & 21 Geo. 5. c. clx))
Needwood Forest or Chase Inclosure Act 1801	41 Geo. 3. (U.K.) c. lvi	20 June 1801
An act for dividing; allotting and inclosing the forest or chase of Needwood, in the county of Stafford.
Royal Exchange Assurance Act 1801 (repealed)	41 Geo. 3. (U.K.) c. lvii	20 June 1801
An act to enable the corporation of The Royal Exchange Assurance, to assure vessels, barges, keels, boats, and other craft employed in inland navigation, and the goods, merchandizes and effects laden therein. (Repealed by Royal Exchange Assurance Act 1901 (1 Edw. 7. c. x))
London Assurance Act 1801 (repealed)	41 Geo. 3. (U.K.) c. lviii	20 June 1801
An act to enable the corporation of The London Assurance to assure vessels, barges, keels, boats, and other craft employed in inland navigation, and the goods, merchandizes and effects laden therein. (Repealed by London Assurance Act 1891 (54 & 55 Vict. c. cxxvi))
Road from Reading to Basingstoke Act 1801 (repealed)	41 Geo. 3. (U.K.) c. lix	20 June 1801
An act for more effectually repairing, widening, diverting, and improving the road leading from Reading in the county of Berks, to Basingstoke in the county of Southampton. (Repealed by Road from Reading to Basingstoke Act 1822 (3 Geo. 4. c. lii))
Road from Dartford to Northfleet Act 1801 (repealed)	41 Geo. 3. (U.K.) c. lx	20 June 1801
An act for continuing the term and altering the powers of two several acts, made respectively in the first (Note: Dartford and Strood Roads Act 1760 (1 Geo. 3. c. 40)) and twenty-second (Note: Kent Roads Act 1782 (22 Geo. 3. c. 98)) years of the reign of his present Majesty, for amending and maintaining the road from Dartford to Northfleet, and other roads therein mentioned, in the county of Kent, and for other purposes in the said acts mentioned. (Repealed by Road from Dartford to Strood Act 1822 (3 Geo. 4. c. lxx))
Exeter and Crediton Navigation Act 1801	41 Geo. 3. (U.K.) c. lxi	20 June 1801
An act for improving and extending the navigation of the river Exe, from the publick quay at Exeter to the publick road adjoining four mills near Crediton in the county of Devon, by making a navigable canal or cuts, and deepening and widening such parts of the rivers Exe and Credy as shall be necessary for that purpose.
Coventry Poor Relief Act 1801 (repealed)	41 Geo. 3. (U.K.) c. lxii	20 June 1801
An act for the better relief and employment of the poor in the several parishes of Saint Michael and the Holy Trinity in the city of Coventry, and county of the same city; and for exempting the vicars of the said parishes from being rated to the relief of the poor in respect of certain assessments. (Repealed by Local Government Board Provisional Order Confirmation (No. 3) Act 1873 (36 & 37 Vict. c. lxxxiii))
Mitford and Launditch Poor Relief Act 1801 (repealed)	41 Geo. 3. (U.K.) c. lxiii	20 June 1801
An act to alter, amend, and render more effectual an act passed in the fifteenth year of the reign of his present Majesty, intituled, "An act for the better relief and employment of the poor within the hundreds of Mitford and Launditch in the county of Norfolk." (Note: Mitford and Launditch, Norfolk (Poor Relief) Act 1775 (15 Geo. 3. c. 59)) (Repealed by Statute Law (Repeals) Act 2013 (c. 2))
Leeds Kirkgate Street Church Act 1801	41 Geo. 3. (U.K.) c. lxiv	20 June 1801
An act for establishing a new church or chapel, lately erected in or near Kirkgate Street, within the town and parish of Leeds, in the west riding of the county of York.
Hull Market Place and Dock Improvement Act 1801	41 Geo. 3. (U.K.) c. lxv	20 June 1801
An Act for enlarging and improving the Market-Place of the town of Kingston-Upon-Hull, and for making a commodious Street from thence to the river Humber, with a Dock and Wharf or Landing Place for the Ferry and Market Boats belonging and resorting to the said town.
Rotherham Market and Improvement Act 1801 (repealed)	41 Geo. 3. (U.K.) c. lxvi	20 June 1801
An act for enlarging and improving the market place within the town of Rotherham in the west riding of the county of York, and for widening and rendering more commodious the streets and avenues leading thereto; and for cleansing, lighting, and regulating the streets and other publick passages and places within the said town. (Repealed by Statute Law (Repeals) Act 1989 (c. 43))
Newcastle-upon-Tyne and Gateshead Bridge and Gateshead Improvement Act 1801	41 Geo. 3. (U.K.) c. lxvii	20 June 1801
An act for continuing and amending an act passed in the twenty-eighth year of his present Majesty's reign, (Note: Newcastle and Gateshead Bridge Act 1788 (28 Geo. 3. c. 78)) intituled, "An act for enlarging the terms and powers of two acts, of the twelfth (Note: Tyne Bridge (No. 2) Act 1772 (12 Geo. 3. c. 100)) and nineteenth (Note: Tyne Bridge Act 1779 (19 Geo. 3. c. 78)) years of his present Majesty's reign, made for building a temporary bridge, and completing a new stone bridge over the river Tyne, between the town of Newcastle upon Tyne and Gateshead in the county of Durham, and making the avenues to, and the passages over the same more commodious; and for removing and preventing nuisances and annoyances in the streets, lanes, or avenues leading to the said new stone bridge, within the town of Gateshead in the county of Durham;" and for enabling the trustees named in the said act to widen and enlarge the said new stone bridge.
Wilts and Berks Canal Act 1801 (repealed)	41 Geo. 3. (U.K.) c. lxviii	20 June 1801
An Act for enabling the Company of Proprietors of the Wilts and Berks Canal Navigation, to raise Money for completing the said Canal; and to alter, explain, and amend the Act, passed in the Thirty-fifth Year of the Reign of His present Majesty, (Note: Wilts and Berks Canal Act 1795 (35 Geo. 3. c. 52)) for making the said Canal. (Repealed by Wilts and Berks Canal Navigation Act 1821 (1 & 2 Geo. 4. c. xcvii))
Scarborough Harbour Act 1801	41 Geo. 3. (U.K.) c. lxix	20 June 1801
An act for further continuing the duties and altering the powers granted by four acts made in the fifth (Note: Scarborough Harbour Act 1731 (5 Geo. 2. c. 11)) and twenty-fifth (Note: Scarborough Harbour Act 1751 (25 Geo. 2. c. 44)) years of his late majesty King George the Second, and in the third (Note: Scarborough Pier Act 1763 (3 Geo. 3. c. 42)) and eighteenth (Note: Scarborough Pier Act 1778 (18 Geo. 3. c. 20)) years of his present Majesty's reign, for enlarging the pier and harbour of Scarborough in the county of York.
Ellesmere and Chester Canal Act 1801 (repealed)	41 Geo. 3. (U.K.) c. lxx	20 June 1801
An Act to authorize the Company of Proprietors of the Ellesmere Canal to extend the said Canal from the Whitchurch Branch thereof, at or near certain Water Corn Mills called The New Mills, in the Parish of Whitchurch, in the County of Salop, to and to communicate with the Chester Canal, in the Township of Stoke, in the Parish of Acton, in the County of Chester; and for altering and amending the several Acts passed for making and maintaining the said Ellesmere Canal. (Repealed by Ellesmere and Chester Canal Act 1827 (7 & 8 Geo. 4. c. cii))
Grand Junction Canal Act 1801	41 Geo. 3. (U.K.) c. lxxi	20 June 1801
An Act for enabling the Company of Proprietors of the Grand Junction Canal more effectually to provide for the Discharge of their Debts, and to complete the Whole of the Works to be executed by them, in pursuance of the several Acts of the Thirty-third, (Note: Grand Junction Canal Act 1793 (33 Geo. 3. c. 80)) Thirty-fourth, (Note: Grand Junction Canal Act 1794 (34 Geo. 3. c. 24)) Thirty-fifth, (Note: Grand Junction Canal (No. 1) Act 1795 (35 Geo. 3. c. 8)) (Note: Grand Junction Canal (No. 2) Act 1795 (35 Geo. 3. c. 43)) (Note: Grand Junction Canal (No. 3) Act 1795 (35 Geo. 3. c. 85)) Thirty-sixth (Note: Grand Junction Canal (No. 4) Act 1795 (36 Geo. 3. c. 25)) and Thirty-eighth (Note: Grand Junction Canal Act 1798 (38 Geo. 3. c. xxxiii)) Years of the Reign of his present Majesty; and for altering and enlarging the Powers and Provisions of the said acts.
Somerset Drainage Act 1801 or the Brue Drainage Act 1801	41 Geo. 3. (U.K.) c. lxxii	20 June 1801
An Act for draining, preserving from Water, and improving certain Low Lands and Grounds, lying within the several Parishes or Chapelries of North Wooton, Pilton, West Pennard, Baltonsborough, Barton Saint Davids, Butleigh, Street, Glaston Saint John, Glaston Saint Benedict, Walton Ashcot, Shapwick, Moorlinch, Catcott, Chilton, Edington, Cossington, Woolavington, Huntspill, East Brent, South Brent, Mark, Wedmore, Meare, Burnam, Badgworth, Baddisham, Chapel Allerton, Were, Puriton, Pawlet, Wookey, and the Out Parish of Saint Cuthbert, in Wells, all in the County of Somerset.
Leverington Drainage Act 1801	41 Geo. 3. (U.K.) c. lxxiii	20 June 1801
An act for draining and improving certain lands and grounds in the parish of Leverington and Leverington Parson Drove, in the isle of Ely, in the county of Cambridge.
Ashby in Bottesford Inclosure and Drainage Act 1801	41 Geo. 3. (U.K.) c. lxxiv	20 June 1801
An act for dividing, allotting, inclosing, draining, embanking, and improving the open fields, meadows, pastures, moors, commons, and waste grounds, in the township of Ashby, in the parish of Bottesford, in the county of Lincoln.
South Walsham Inclosure and Drainage Act 1801	41 Geo. 3. (U.K.) c. lxxv	20 June 1801
An act for dividing, allotting, and inclosing the open field, commonable marsh lands, half year shack lands, commons, and waste grounds within the parishes of South Walsham Saint Laurence and South Walsham Saint Mary in the county of Norfolk; and for draining and preserving the same.
Potter Heigham Inclosure and Drainage Act 1801	41 Geo. 3. (U.K.) c. lxxvi	20 June 1801
An act for dividing, allotting, inclosing, draining, and preserving the open fields, marsh lands, commons, fens, and waste grounds, within the parish of Potter Heigham in the county of Norfolk.
Salop. Inclosures and Drainage Act 1801 or the Wildmoors Inclosure Act 1801	41 Geo. 3. (U.K.) c. lxxvii	20 June 1801
An Act for dividing, allotting, inclosing, draining, and improving several Common Moors, called Sydney Moor, Small Moor, Rodway Moor, Waters Upton Moor, and other Commons and Waste Lands within the several Parishes of Rockwardine, Eyton, Kinnersley, and Waters Upton, in the County of Salop, and within the several Townships of Crudgeington and Sleap, in the Parish of High Ercall, otherwise Ercall Magna, in the same County.
Morpeth and Elsdon Road Act 1801	41 Geo. 3. (U.K.) c. lxxviii	20 June 1801
An act for enlarging the term and powers of two acts, passed in the twenty-fifth year of the reign of his late majesty King George the Second, (Note: Morpeth and Elsdon Road Act 1751 (25 Geo. 2. c. 33)) and the eighteenth year of the reign of his present Majesty, (Note: Morpeth to Elsdon Road Act 1778 (18 Geo. 3. c. 107)) for repairing the road leading from the town of Morpeth, by or through Mitford, Thropple, Long Witton, and by the north side of Rothley park wall to Sting Cross, and to the high cross in Elsdon in the county of Northumberland.
Culham and Fyfield Roads Act 1801 (repealed)	41 Geo. 3. (U.K.) c. lxxix	20 June 1801
An act for continuing for twenty-one years, and from thence to the end of the then next session of parliament, the term, and altering and enlarging the powers of three acts, passed in the ninth (Note: Berkshire and Oxfordshire Roads Act 1735 (9 Geo. 2. c. 14)) and twenty-eighth (Note: Oxford and Buckinghamshire Roads Act 1755 (28 Geo. 2. c. 42)) years of the reign of his late majesty King George the Second, and in the twenty-first year of the reign of his present majesty King George the Third, (Note: Henley to Oxford Road Act 1781 (21 Geo. 3. c. 97)) for amending and keeping in repair such part of the roads described in the said act of the twenty-eighth year of his late Majesty's reign, as leads from the end of Culham Bridge next to Culham in the county of Oxford, to the end of Burford Bridge next to Abingdon in the county of Berks, and from the mayor's stone at the end of Boar Street in the town of Abingdon aforesaid, to Shippon in the said county of Berks, and from thence to the west end of the town of Fyfield, in the same county. (Repealed by Culham, Abingdon and Fyfield Roads Act 1822 (3 Geo. 4. c. xxxvi))
Royston and Wandesford Bridge Roads (South District) Act 1801 (repealed)	41 Geo. 3. (U.K.) c. lxxx	20 June 1801
An act for more effectually repairing and improving the south district or division of the roads from Royston in the county of Hertford to Wandesford Bridge in the county of Huntingdon; and for continuing and amending an act passed in the thirtieth year of the reign of his present Majesty, (Note: Hertfordshire and Huntingdonshire Roads Act 1790 (30 Geo. 3. c. 89)) so far as the said act relates to the said district. (Repealed by Royston and Wandesford Bridge Road Act 1822 (3 Geo. 4. c. lxviii))
Span Smithy, Winsford Bridge and Northwich Roads Act 1801 (repealed)	41 Geo. 3. (U.K.) c. lxxxi	20 June 1801
An act for continuing for twenty-one years, and from thence to the end of the then next session of parliament, the term, and altering the powers of two acts, passed in the twenty-sixth year of the reign of his late majesty King George the Second, (Note: Span Smithy, Winsford Bridge and Northwich Roads Act 1753 (26 Geo. 2. c. 84)) and in the nineteenth year of the reign of his present Majesty, (Note: Span Smithy, Winsford Bridge and Northwich Roads Act 1779 (19 Geo. 3. c. 113)) for repairing and widening the roads from Spann Smithy in the township of Elton, through the town of Middlewich, and by Spittle Hill in Stanthorn, to Winsford bridge, and from Spittle Hilt to the town of Northwich in the county palatine of Chester. (Repealed by Span Smithy, Winsford Bridge and Northwich Roads Act 1822 (3 Geo. 4. c. xlviii))
Brough and Eamont Bridge Road Act 1801 (repealed)	41 Geo. 3. (U.K.) c. lxxxii	20 June 1801
An act for continuing for twenty-one years, and from thence to the end of the then next session of parliament, the term, and enlarging the powers of two acts, made in the twenty-sixth year of the reign of his late majesty King George the Second, (Note: Brough and Eamont Bridge Road Act 1753 (26 Geo. 2. c. 67)) and the nineteenth year of the reign of his present Majesty, (Note: Brough and Eamont Bridge Road Act 1779 (19 Geo. 3. c. 106)) for repairing and widening the roads from the east end of Borough-under-Stainmore (Note: Brough, Cumbria.) in the county of Westmorland, by the end of Appleby Bridge, (Note: The B6542 (former A66) road passes the end of the bridge over the River Eden, in Appleby-in-Westmorland, Cumbria. 54°34′42″N 2°29′21″W) to Eamont Bridge (Note: Eamont Bridge carrying the A6 road across the River Eamont in Cumbria. 54°39′06″N 2°44′31″W) in the said county. (Repealed by Brough and Eamont Bridge Turnpike Act 1856 (19 & 20 Vict. c. lxxii))
Road from Rugby to the Lutterworth and Market Harborough Turnpike Road Act 1801 (repealed)	41 Geo. 3. (U.K.) c. lxxxiii	20 June 1801
An act for repairing and widening the road from the town of Rugby in the county of Warwick, to join the turnpike road leading from Lutterworth to Market Harborough in the counties of Leicester and Northampton. (Repealed by Road from Rugby to Kilworth Act 1823 (4 Geo. 4. c. lxiii))
Road from Drayton Lane to Edge Hill Act 1801 (repealed)	41 Geo. 3. (U.K.) c. lxxxiv	20 June 1801
An act to continue for twenty-one years, and from thence to the end of the then next session of parliament, the term, and alter the powers of two acts, one passed in the twenty-sixth year of the reign of his late majesty King George the Second, intituled, "An act to widen and repair the road from the guide post near the end of Drayton Lane near Banbury, in the county of Oxford, to the house called the Sun-rising, at the top of Edge Hill, in the county of Warwick;" (Note: Drayton and Edgehill Road Act 1753 (26 Geo. 2. c. 78)) and the other, passed in the twentieth year of the reign of his present majesty King George the Third, (Note: Banbury Road Act 1780 (20 Geo. 3. c. 67)) for enlarging the term and powers of the said act. (Repealed by Road from Banbury to Edgehill Act 1822 (3 Geo. 4. c. xc))
Tetbury Roads Act 1801 (repealed)	41 Geo. 3. (U.K.) c. lxxxv	20 June 1801
An act for continuing for twenty-one years, and from thence to the end of the then next session of parliament, the term, and altering and enlarging the powers of two acts passed in the thirty-first year of the reign of his late majesty King George the Second, (Note: Gloucestershire Roads (No. 3) Act 1757 (31 Geo. 2. c. 65)) and in the twentieth year of the reign of his present Majesty, (Note: Gloucester Roads Act 1780 (20 Geo. 3. c. 70)) for repairing and widening several roads therein mentioned, so far as the same acts relate to the road from the market house in Tetbury to the turnpike road on Minchinhampton common, and from the said road in Minchinhampton field unto the turnpike road from Cirencester to Stroud, near Burnt Ash, and from the said turnpike road to Tayloe's Mill Pond in Chalford Bottom, and through Hide to the bottom of the Bourne Hill, in the county of Gloucester, and for repairing, altering, and improving the road from Tayloe's Mill Pond aforesaid to Foston's Ash, in the parish of Bisley, in the said county of Gloucester. (Repealed by Statute Law (Repeals) Act 2013 (c. 2))
Newcastle-upon-Tyne Trinity House and Port Act 1801 (repealed)	41 Geo. 3. (U.K.) c. lxxxvi	20 June 1801
An act for extending and enlarging the powers, and increasing the rates and duties of the corporation of the Trinity House of Newcastle upon Tyne, and for better regulating the port of Newcastle. (Repealed by Pilotage Orders Confirmation (No. 3) Act 1922 (12 & 13 Geo. 5. c. xxxviii))
Road from Melton Mowbray to Grantham (Lincolnshire) Act 1801 (repealed)	41 Geo. 3. (U.K.) c. lxxxvii	20 June 1801
An act for continuing for twenty-one years, and from thence to the end of the then next session of parliament, the term, and altering and enlarging the powers of an act, passed in the twentieth year of the reign of his present Majesty, (Note: Melton Mowbray to Grantham Road Act 1780 (20 Geo. 3. c. 95)) for making and maintaining the road from Sage Cross in the town of Melton Mowbray in the county of Leicester, to the town of Grantham in the county of Lincoln. (Repealed by Melton Mowbray and Grantham Road Act 1823 (4 Geo. 4. c. l))
Shrewsbury Roads Act 1801	41 Geo. 3. (U.K.) c. lxxxviii	20 June 1801
An act to continue for twenty-one years, and from thence to the end of the then next session of parliament, the term, and alter and enlarge the powers of an act, passed in the thirty-first year of the reign of his late majesty King George the Second, (Note: Shrewsbury, etc. Roads Act 1757 (31 Geo. 2. c. 67)) for widening and repairing several roads leading from the Welsh Gate and Cotton Hill in the town of Shrewsbury, in the county of Salop; and for making and maintaining a new branch of road from the present road from Shrewsbury to Welch Pool, at or near the tenth mile stone, to, or near to, Buttington Hall in the county of Montgomery.
Road from Ticehurst to Hastings Act 1801 (repealed)	41 Geo. 3. (U.K.) c. lxxxix	20 June 1801
An act to continue for twenty-one years, and from thence to the end of the then next session of parliament, the term, and alter and enlarge the powers of two acts, passed in the twenty-sixth year of the reign of his late majesty King George the Second, (Note: Flimwell and Hastings Road Act 1753 (26 Geo. 2. c. 54)) and in the nineteenth year of the reign of his present Majesty, (Note: Flimwell and Hastings Road Act 1779 (19 Geo. 3. c. 98)) for repairing and widening the road leading from Flimwell Vent in the parish of Ticehurst in the county of Sussex, to the town and port of Hastings in the said county. (Repealed by Road from Ticehurst to Hastings Act 1821 (1 & 2 Geo. 4. c. xli))
Whitchurch and Ternhill and Newport (Salop.) Road Act 1801	41 Geo. 3. (U.K.) c. xc	20 June 1801
An act to continue for twenty-one years, and from thence to the end of the then next session of parliament, the term, and alter and enlarge the powers of two acts, passed in the thirty-third year of the reign of his late majesty King George the Second, (Note: Chester to Birmingham Road Act 1759 (33 Geo. 2. c. 51)) and in the eighteenth year of the reign of his present Majesty, (Note: Chester and Whitchurch Roads Act 1778 (18 Geo. 3. c. 86)) for repairing and widening the road from the bars at Boughton, within the liberties of the city of Chester, to Whitchurch, and from thence to Newport, in the county of Salop, and several other roads therein mentioned, so far as the said acts relate to the road leading from Whitchurch aforesaid, through Ternhill, to Newport aforesaid, being the second district of roads in the said acts mentioned.
Road from Mansfield to the Derby and Chesterfield Turnpike Road Act 1801	41 Geo. 3. (U.K.) c. xci	20 June 1801
An act for continuing the term and powers of two acts, passed in the thirty-second year of the reign of his late majesty King George the Second, (Note: Mansfield and Chesterfield Road Act 1758 (32 Geo. 2. c. 37)) and the twentieth year of the reign of his present Majesty, (Note: Mansfield and Chesterfield Road Act 1780 (20 Geo. 3. c. 72)) for repairing and widening the road from the town of Mansfield, in the county of Nottingham, through the towns of Pleasley, Glapwell Heath, and Normenton, and the liberty of Hasland, to the turnpike road leading from the town of Derby to the town of Chesterfield, in the county of Derby.
Liskeard Roads Act 1801 (repealed)	41 Geo. 3. (U.K.) c. xcii	20 June 1801
An act for continuing for twenty-one years, and from thence to the end of the then next session of parliament, the term, and altering and enlarging the powers of two acts, passed in the first (Note: Cornwall and Devon Roads Act 1760 (1 Geo. 3. c. 25)) and tenth (Note: Cornwall and Devon Roads Act 1770 (10 Geo. 3. c. 87)) years of the reign of his present majesty King George the Third, for repairing and widening the road from the east end of West Taphouse Lane to the borough of Liskeard, and from thence to the Combe Rowe House, and several other roads therein mentioned, in the counties of Cornwall and Devon. (Repealed by Liskeard Roads Act 1823 (4 Geo. 4. c. lii))
Wrexham, Ruthin, Denbigh and Cerniogau-Mawr Roads Act 1801	41 Geo. 3. (U.K.) c. xciii	20 June 1801
An act for continuing for twenty-one years, and from thence to the end of the then next session of parliament, the term, and altering and enlarging the powers of two acts, passed in the thirty-second year of the reign of his late majesty King George the Second, (Note: Denbigh, Flint and Carnarvon Roads Act 1758 (32 Geo. 2. c. 55)) and in the twentieth year of the reign of his present Majesty, (Note: Denbigh Flint and Carnarvon Roads Act 1780 (20 Geo. 3. c. 97)) for repairing and widening several roads therein mentioned, so far as the said acts relate to the road leading from the town of Wrexham to the towns of Ruthin and Denbigh, in the county of Denbigh, and amending, widening, altering, improving, and keeping in repair, the road leading from the said town of Ruthin into the turnpike road from Corwen to Llanrwft, at or near a certain house called Cernioge Mawr, in the parish of Llanyfydd, in the said county.
Horsley, Rodborough and Minchinhampton Road Act 1801 (repealed)	41 Geo. 3. (U.K.) c. xciv	20 June 1801
An act to continue for twenty-one years, and from thence to the end of the then next session of parliament, the term, and alter and enlarge the powers of an act, passed in the twentieth year of the reign of his present majesty King George the Third, (Note: Gloucester Roads (No. 2) Act 1780 (20 Geo. 3. c. 84)) for making and maintaining a road from Tiltups inn, in the parish of Horsley, to join the turnpike road leading from Cirencester to Dudbridge, at or near Dudbridge, in the parish of Rodborough, and from the bridge at Nailsworth, in the parish of Avening, to Minchinhampton Common, and several other roads therein mentioned, all in the county of Gloucester, and for altering some parts of the said roads. (Repealed by Gloucestershire Roads Act 1822 (3 Geo. 4. c. lxi))
Stockbridge, Winchester, Bishop's Waltham and Southampton Roads Act 1801 (repealed)	41 Geo. 3. (U.K.) c. xcv	20 June 1801
An act to continue the term, and alter and enlarge the powers of two acts, made in the thirty-first year of the reign of his late Majesty, (Note: Stockbridge and Winchester Roads Act 1757 (31 Geo. 2. c. 75)) and in the twentieth year of the reign of his present Majesty, (Note: Stockbridge and Winchester Roads Act 1780 (20 Geo. 3. c. 90)) for repairing and widening the roads from the town of Stockbridge, in the county of Southampton, to the city of Winchester, and from the said city through Bellmour Lane to the top of Stephen's Castle Down, near the town of Bishop's Waltham, in the said county, and from the said city of Winchester, through Otterborne, to Bar Gate, in the town and county of the town of Southampton. (Repealed by Stockbridge, Winchester and Southampton Roads Act 1823 (4 Geo. 4. c. xv))
Hurdlow House, Manchester and Chapel-en-le-Frith Roads Act 1801 (repealed)	41 Geo. 3. (U.K.) c. xcvi	20 June 1801
An act for continuing for twenty-one years, and from thence to the end of the then next session of parliament, the term, and altering and enlarging the powers of an act, passed in the thirty-third year of the reign of his present Majesty, intituled, "An act for repairing, widening, altering, diverting, and turning the road from Hurdlow House, (Note: The Bull I' Th' Thorn inn on the A515 Ashbourne Road at Hurdlow was formerly called Hurdlow House. 53°11′44″N 1°48′37″W) through Buxton, in the county of Derby, and Stockport, in the county of Chester, to Manchester, in the county of Lancaster, and also the road from Hernestone Lane Head, and from Sparrow Pit Gate, through Chapel-en-le-Frith, alt in the said county of Derby, to the last mentioned road at Whaley, in the said county of Chester;" (Note: Manchester to Buxton Road Act 1793 (33 Geo. 3. c. 171)) and for making and repairing a new branch of road from the said turnpike road at or near Barmoor Clough, near the town of Chapel-en-le-Frith aforesaid, to Fairfield near Buxton aforesaid. (Repealed by Road from Hurdlow House to Manchester Act 1821 (1 & 2 Geo. 4. c. xviii))
Cutlers' Company's Act 1801 or the Hallamshire Cutlers Act 1801	41 Geo. 3. (U.K.) c. xcvii	20 June 1801
An Act for amending and rendering more effectual an Act passed in the Thirty first Year of the Reign of His present Majesty, (Note: Cutlers' Company's Act 1791 (31 Geo. 3. c. 58)) for the better Regulation and Government of the Company of Cutlers, within the Liberty of Hallamshire, in the County of York, and within Six Miles of the said Liberty, and of their Journeymen and Apprentices.
Stockport and Marple Bridge Road Act 1801 (repealed)	41 Geo. 3. (U.K.) c. xcviii	20 June 1801
An Act for making, widening, and repairing the Road from the Old Bridge, in the Town of Stockport, in the County of Chester, through the several Townships of Stockport, Offerton, and Marple, to or near Marple Bridge, all in the said County, and a Branch from the said Road in the Township of Marple aforesaid, through the Village of New Mills, to or near Thornset Gate, both in the County of Derby, and another Branch from or near Thornset Gate aforesaid, through the Village of New Mills aforesaid, to or near the present Road, in the Township of Disley, in the said County of Chester. (Repealed by Stockport and Marple Bridge Road Act 1822 (3 Geo. 4. c. viii))
Road from Dunstable to Pondyards Act 1801 (repealed)	41 Geo. 3. (U.K.) c. xcix	20 June 1801
An act for continuing for twenty-one years, and from thence to the end of the then next session of parliament, the term, and altering and enlarging the powers of an act, passed in the twenty-sixth year of the reign of his present majesty King George the Third, (Note: Bedford and Hertford Roads Act 1786 (26 Geo. 3. c. 130)) for more effectually repairing the road from the Black Bull inn, (Note: The Black Bull was a coaching inn located on the A505 Watling Street, in Dunstable, Bedfordshire. It has been converted to apartments and renamed Vale Court. 51°53′22″N 0°31′34″W) in Dunstable, in the county of Bedford, to the way turning out of the said road up to Shafford House, (Note: Just south of the Bow Bridge over the River Ver, on the A5183 road Redbourn Road between Redbourn and St Albans, Hertfordshire. 51°46′04″N 0°22′15″W) in the County of Hertford. (Repealed by Dunstable and Pondyards Road Act 1821 (1 & 2 Geo. 4. c. cvii))
Knapp's Estate Act 1801	41 Geo. 3. (U.K.) c. c	20 June 1801
An act for vesting in trustees all the real estates late of Nathaniel Matthew Knapp esquire, deceased, which, by his will, were devised in strict settlement, to the intent that proper parts thereof may be sold for discharging the incumbrances affecting the same real estates, and that the residue of the money, if any, arising by such sale may be invested in the purchase of other lands, and that the lands to be so purchased, and also such part of the lands, to be vested in trustees as aforesaid, as shall not be sold, may be settled to the uses contained in the will of the said Nathaniel Matthew Knapp, concerning his real estates devised in strict settlement.
Maw's Estate Act 1801	41 Geo. 3. (U.K.) c. ci	20 June 1801
An act for vesting the settled estates of John Henry Maw of Warmsworth, in the county of York, esquire, in trustees, to be sold, and for laying out the clear monies thence arising, under the direction of the court of chancery, in the purchase of other estates, to be settled in lieu thereof, and to the same uses.
Duncombe's Estate Act 1801	41 Geo. 3. (U.K.) c. cii	20 June 1801
An act for vesting part of the estates devised by the will of Thomas Duncombe esquire, in trustees, to be sold, and for laying out the monies to arise therefrom in the purchase of other estates, to be settled, in lieu thereof, to the same uses.
Marquis of Salisbury's Estate Act 1801	41 Geo. 3. (U.K.) c. ciii	20 June 1801
An act for vesting part of the settled estates of the most honourable James marquis of Salisbury in trustees, to be sold, and for applying the purchase money in discharging of a mortgage thereon, and for confirming the settlement of the residue of such estates, and declaring the same to be a satisfaction of his marriage articles, and for appointing a new trustee instead of one deceased.
Adcock's Estate Act 1801	41 Geo. 3. (U.K.) c. civ	20 June 1801
An act to confirm, and render valid and effectual, a partition of divers lands and hereditaments in the several counties of Rutland, Lincoln, and Leicester, late the estates of Joseph Adcock grazier, deceased, and also of divers lands and hereditaments in the county of Northampton, late the estates of Robert Adcock grazier, deceased.
Bury St. Edmunds Guildhall Feoffment and Bunbury's Estate Act 1801	41 Geo. 3. (U.K.) c. cv	20 June 1801
An act for effectuating exchanges between the trustees of the guildhall feoffment, Bury Saint Edmunds, in the county of Suffolk, and sir Thomas Charles Bunbury baronet.
Pitt's Estate Act 1801	41 Geo. 3. (U.K.) c. cvi	20 June 1801
An act for vesting certain settled estates of William Morton Pitt esquire, in the county of Dorset, in trustees, to be sold, and for laying out the whole money thence arising, under the direction of the court of chancery, in the purchase of other estates, to be settled in lieu thereof, and to the same uses.
Earl of Ilchester's Estate Act 1801	41 Geo. 3. (U.K.) c. cvii	20 June 1801
An act for vesting part of the settled estates of the right honourable Henry Thomas earl of Ilchester, in the counties of Wilts and Somerset, in trustees, to be sold, and for settling other estates of the said earl, in the said county of Somerset, and in the county of Dorset, in lieu thereof.
Constable's Estate Act 1801	41 Geo. 3. (U.K.) c. cviii	20 June 1801
An act for enabling Edward Constable esquire, of Burton Constable, in Holderness, in the county of York, tenant for life, under the will of his late uncle William Constable esquire, deceased, to charge his estates in the said county of York, or some pare thereof, with the sums therein mentioned, and also for enabling the trustees in the said act, to raise, with the consent of the said Edward Constable, during his life, and after his decease, in such manner as therein is mentioned, certain sums of money for the protecting, improving, and increasing the same estates, by the means therein described.
Viscount Irwin's Estate Act 1801	41 Geo. 3. (U.K.) c. cix	20 June 1801
An act for vesting two freehold messuages in Lombard Street, in the city of London, part of the estates devised by the will of the right honourable Charles lord viscount Irwin deceased, in trustees, for sale, and for investing the money to arise from such sale, under the direction of the court of chancery, in the purchase of other real estates in England, to be settled to the uses of the said will.
Jervoise's Estate Act 1801	41 Geo. 3. (U.K.) c. cx	20 June 1801
An act for vesting part of the estates of the reverend George Huddleston Purefoy Jervoise, devised by the will of Tristram Huddleston Jervoise esquire, in trustees, to be sold, and for laying out the money to arise therefrom, under the direction of the court of chancery, in the purchase of other estates, to be settled in lieu thereof, and to the same uses.
Fitzgerald's Estate Act 1801	41 Geo. 3. (U.K.) c. cxi	20 June 1801
An act for vesting the estates of John Fitzgerald esquire, commonly called The Knight of Glinn, situate in the county of Limerick, in trustees, for raising, by sale or mortgage, monies sufficient to pay off incumbrances.
Chapelry of St. Hilds, Jarrow, Building Lease Act 1801	41 Geo. 3. (U.K.) c. cxii	20 June 1801
An act to enable the curate of the chapelry of Saint Hilds, in the parish of Jarrow, in the county of Durham, to grant a building lease of a certain parcel of ground lying contiguous to the town of South Shields, in the said county, and belonging to the said chapelry.
Great and Little Heaths in Cardiff, Landaff, Whitchurch, Roath and Lanishen Inclosures Act 1801	41 Geo. 3. (U.K.) c. cxiii	20 June 1801
An act for dividing, allotting, and inclosing the several common waste and heath lands, commonly known by the names of the Great and Little Heaths, otherwise Mwynydd, Bwchan, and Wain Dyval, lying within the several parishes of Saint John the Baptist in Cardiff, Landaff, Whitchurch, Roath, and Lanishen, in the county of Glamorgan.
Ticklerton Inclosure Act 1801	41 Geo. 3. (U.K.) c. cxiv	20 June 1801
An act for dividing, allotting, and inclosing certain commons and waste lands, in the township of Ticklerton, within the parish of Eaton, in the county of Salop.
Foss Navigation and Drainage Act 1801	41 Geo. 3. (U.K.) c. cxv	23 June 1801
An Act to explain and amend an Act passed in the Thirty third Year of the Reign of His present Majesty, intituled, "An Act for making and maintaining a Navigable Communication from the Junction of the River Foss with the River Ouse, at or near the City of York, to Stillington Mill, in the Parish of Stillington, in the North Riding of the County of York, and for draining and improving certain Low Lands, lying on each Side of the said River Foss," (Note: Foss Navigation Act 1793 (33 Geo. 3. c. 99)) so far as the said Act relates to the said Navigation, and for enabling the Company of Proprietors of the said Navigation to complete the same.
Crowland Inclosure Act 1801	41 Geo. 3. (U.K.) c. cxvi	23 June 1801
An Act for draining, dividing, and inclosing a Common, called Crowland Common, otherwise Goggushland, and certain open Half-year's Meadow, Commonable, and Waste Grounds, called The Washes and Fodder Lots, in, adjoining, or near the Township of Crowland, in the County of Lincoln.
Road from Bridgford to Kettering Act 1801	41 Geo. 3. (U.K.) c. cxvii	23 June 1801
An act for repairing the road from the north end of Bridgeford Lane, in the county of Nottingham, to the bowling green at Kettering, in the county of Northampton; and for repealing two acts (Note: Bridgeford Lane, Nottinghamshire to Kettering Road Act 1754 (27 Geo. 2. c. 39)) (Note: Bridgeford Lane, Nottinghamshire to Kettering Road Act 1780 (20 Geo. 3. c. 81)) passed for repairing the said road.
Road from Leicester to Peterborough Act 1801 (repealed)	41 Geo. 3. (U.K.) c. cxviii	23 June 1801
An act for repairing the road from the borough of Leicester, to Peterborough, in the county of Northampton; and for repealing two acts (Note: Leicester to Peterborough Road Act 1754 (27 Geo. 2. c. 30)) (Note: Leicester to Peterborough Road Act 1774 (14 Geo. 3. c. 113)) passed for repairing the said road. (Repealed by Leicester and Peterborough Road Act 1843 (6 & 7 Vict. c. xcvi))
Earl of Oxford's Estate Act 1801	41 Geo. 3. (U.K.) c. cxix	23 June 1801
An act for vesting certain estates in the county of Norfolk, strictly entailed by the will of Horatio late earl of Orford deceased, in trustees, to be sold, and for laying out the money arising therefrom, in the first place, in discharge of the incumbrances affecting the same, and the residue thereof in the purchase of other estates in the county of Norfolk, to be settled to the same uses.
Durham County Schools Act 1801 (repealed)	41 Geo. 3. (U.K.) c. cxx	23 June 1801
An act for the establishment of schools for the education of poor children in the county palatine of Durham. (Repealed by Statute Law (Repeals) Act 2013 (c. 2))
Pugh's Estate Act 1801	41 Geo. 3. (U.K.) c. cxxi	23 June 1801
An act for vesting the fee simple, and inheritance of and in the real estates devised by the will of Mary Pugh widow, deceased, situate in the counties of Carnarvon and Anglesey, in trustees, and their heirs, upon trust, to complete the sales of such parts thereof as have been sold under the direction of the court of chancery, and by the like directions to sell other competent parts thereof, for the payment of the debts and incumbrances affecting the same estates, and for laying out the surplus of the money (if any) to arise from such sales in the manner and for the purposes therein expressed.
Welsh Gate and Cotton Hill Roads Act 1801 (repealed)	41 Geo. 3. (U.K.) c. cxxii	24 June 1801
An act to continue for twenty-one years, and from thence to the end of the then next session of parliament, the term, and alter and enlarge the powers of two acts, passed in the eight (Note: Salop, Radnor and Montgomery Roads Act 1768 (8 Geo. 3. c. 51)) and twenty-fifth (Note: Salop, Radnor and Montgomery Roads Act 1785 (25 Geo. 3. c. 118)) years of the reign of his present Majesty, for amending and widening several roads leading from the town of Bishop's Castle, and from Montgomery to the turnpike road at Westbury, and from Brockton to the turnpike road at Minsterley, in the several counties of Salop, Radnor, and Montgomery, and several other roads therein mentioned, in the counties of Salop and Montgomery; and also for widening, repairing, altering, and diverting other roads in the said counties of Salop and Montgomery. (Repealed by Roads from Bishop's Castle, Montgomery and Brockton Act 1822 (3 Geo. 4. c. xlix))
Bolton and Leyland Road Act 1801 (repealed)	41 Geo. 3. (U.K.) c. cxxiii	24 June 1801
An act for making and maintaining a road from the turnpike road leading from Bolton to Blackburn, at or near to the Lamb Inn, otherwise Fletcher's publick house, in the township of Sharples, (Note: Sharples is a suburb in the north of Bolton. The road started at Astley Bridge where the A666 Blackburn Road meets the A675 Belmont Road. 53°36′04″N 2°25′58″W) in the parish of Bolton-in-the-Moors, (Note: The parish of Bolton le Moors.) to the turnpike road leading from Preston to Blackburn aforesaid, at or near to Brindle Lane end, otherwise Foole Lane end, in the township of Hoghton, (Note: The junction with Blackburn Old Road, Riley Green, near Hoghton, Lancashire. 53°43′28″N 2°34′33″W) in the parish of Leyland, all in the county palatine of Lancaster. (Repealed by Sharples and Hoghton Turnpike Road (Lancashire) Act 1823 (4 Geo. 4. c. xxii))
Louth (Lincolnshire) Inclosure Act 1801	41 Geo. 3. (U.K.) c. cxxiv	24 June 1801
An act for dividing, allotting, and inclosing the open common fields, meadows, pastures, and other commonable lands and waste grounds, in the parish of Louth, in the county of Lincoln.
Koops' Papermaking Patent Act 1801	41 Geo. 3. (U.K.) c. cxxv	27 June 1801
An Act for enabling Matthias Koops Gentleman, to assign the Benefit of an Invention of making Paper from Straw and other Substances to a greater Number of Persons than is at present limited by the Letters Patent granted to the said Matthias Koops.
Bathwick Improvement Act 1801 (repealed)	41 Geo. 3. (U.K.) c. cxxvi	27 June 1801
An act for paving, steaning, cleansing, watering, lighting, watching, and regulating the streets, squares, lanes, ways, passages, and publick places, within the parish of Bathwick, in the county of Somerset, and for removing and preventing nuisances, annoyances, encroachments, and obstructions, and for establishing a proper and effective police therein. (Repealed by City of Bath Act 1851 (14 & 15 Vict. c. civ))
Croydon Canal and Croydon, Streatham, Dulwich and Sydenham Water Supply Act 1801	41 Geo. 3. (U.K.) c. cxxvii	27 June 1801
An act for making and maintaining a navigable canal from or from near the town of Croydon, in the county of Surrey, into the Grand Surrey Canal, in the parish of St. Paul, Deptford, in the county of Surrey; and for supplying the towns of Croydon, Streatham and Dulwich, and the district called Norwood, in the parish of Croydon, in the said county of Surrey; and the town of Sydenham, in the county of Kent, with water from the said canal.
Kesteven and Holland Inclosures and Drainage Act 1801	41 Geo. 3. (U.K.) c. cxxviii	27 June 1801
An act for draining, dividing, allotting, and inclosing Deeping, Langtoft, Baston, Spalding, Pinchbeck, and Cowbit commons within the parts of Kesteven and Holland, in the county of Lincoln, and also for draining Crowland common, or Goggushland, and certain lands and grounds in the parishes of Bourn and Thurlby, adjoining or lying contiguous to the north bank of the river Glen, and certain inclosed lands in Deeping fen, and in the parishes of Spalding and Pinchbeck, adjoining to the said commons, and lying between the rivers Glen and Welland, and also for rendering more effectual several acts of parliament heretofore passed for draining and preserving the several lands, grounds, and commons herein before mentioned, or certain parts thereof.
Road from Paddington to Harrow-on-the-Hill Act 1801 (repealed)	41 Geo. 3. (U.K.) c. cxxix	27 June 1801
An act for amending, widening, improving, and keeping in repair the road leading from Paddington to Harrow-on-the-Hill, in the county of Middlesex. (Repealed by Road from Paddington to Harrow-on-the-Hill Act 1826 (7 Geo. 4. c. xci))
Stony Stratford Improvement Act 1801 (repealed)	41 Geo. 3. (U.K.) c. cxxx	2 July 1801
An act for paving, cleansing, watering, lighting, and otherwise improving the streets, lanes, and other publick passages and places, within the parishes of Saint Giles and Saint Mary Magdalen, in Stony Stratford, in the county of Buckingham, and for removing and preventing encroachments, obstructions, nuisances, and annoyances therein; and also for repairing the rampart road or causeway from the said town to the bridge over the river Ouse, in or near thereto, and for repairing the said bridge; and likewise for selling certain charity estates situate in the said town of Stony Stratford, and in the parishes of Calverton and Woolverton, in the said county of Buckingham, and applying the money arising by such sale in the manner therein mentioned. (Repealed by Stony Stratford Charities Scheme Confirmation Act 1916 (6 & 7 Geo. 5. c. liii))
St. Pancras Improvement Act 1801 (repealed)	41 Geo. 3. (U.K.) c. cxxxi	2 July 1801
An act for forming, paving, cleansing, lighting, watching, watering, and otherwise improving and keeping in repair, the streets, squares and other publick passages and places which are and shall be made upon certain pieces or plots of ground in the parish of Saint Pancras in the county of Middlesex, belonging to the right honourable Ann dowager baroness Southampton. (Repealed by London Government (Borough of St. Pancras) Order in Council 1901 (SR&O 1901/274))
Winchester Gaol Act 1801 (repealed)	41 Geo. 3. (U.K.) c. cxxxii	2 July 1801
An Act for completing the Common Gaol now building in and for the City of Winchester, and for purchasing certain Buildings within the said City for widening the Avenues thereto. (Repealed by Statute Law (Repeals) Act 2008 (c. 12))
Cartwright's Woolcombing Machinery Act 1801	41 Geo. 3. (U.K.) c. cxxxiii	2 July 1801
An act for vesting, for a limited time, in the reverend Edmund Cartwright clerk, master of arts, his executors, administrators, and assigns, the sole property in certain machinery by him invented for woolcombing.
Hull and Frodingham Beck Navigation Act 1801	41 Geo. 3. (U.K.) c. cxxxiv	2 July 1801
An Act to alter and amend an Act, passed in the Seventh Year of the Reign of His present Majesty intituled, "An Act for improving the Navigation of the River Hull and Frodingham Beck, from Aike Beck Mouth to the Clough on the East Corner Fisholme; and for extending the said Navigation from the said Clough into or near the Town of Great Driffield, in the East Riding of the County of York;" (Note: River Hull and Frodingham Beck Navigation Act 1766 (7 Geo. 3. c. 97)) and to extend and improve the said Navigation
Wildmore and East and West Fens Drainage Act 1801	41 Geo. 3. (U.K.) c. cxxxv	2 July 1801
An act for the better and more effectually draining certain tracts of land called Wildmore Fen, and the West and East Fens, in the county of Lincoln, and also the low lands and grounds in the several parishes, townships and places having right of common on the said fens, and other low lands and grounds lying contiguous or adjoining thereto.
Everton, Scaftworth, Gringley-on-the-Hill, Misterton and Walkeringham Drainage Act 1801 (repealed)	41 Geo. 3. (U.K.) c. cxxxvi	2 July 1801
An act for altering and amending an act, passed in the thirty-sixth year of the reign of his majesty King George the Third, (Note: Everton, etc. (Nottinghamshire) Drainage, etc. Act 1796 (36 Geo. 3. c. 99)) for the more effectually embanking, draining, preserving, and improving certain low lands and grounds, lying and being in the several parishes or townships of Everton, Scaftworth, Gringley-on-the-Hill, Misterton, and Walkeringham, in the county of Nottingham. (Repealed by Everton, &c. Drainage Act 1860 (23 & 24 Vict. c. cliv))
Kidlington Green Road Act 1801 (repealed)	41 Geo. 3. (U.K.) c. cxxxvii	2 July 1801
An Act for continuing for Twenty one Years, and from thence to the End of the then next Session of Parliament, the Term, and enlarging the Powers of an Act, passed in the Twenty first Year of the Reign of His present Majesty, (Note: Oxford Roads Act 1781 (21 Geo. 3. c. 87)) for repairing and widening the Road from a certain Gate on the Turnpike Road at or near the South End of the Town of Weston on the Green, in the County of Oxford, to the Turnpike Road on Kidlington Green, in the said County. (Repealed by Statute Law (Repeals) Act 2013 (c. 2))
Annesley's Estate Act 1801	41 Geo. 3. (U.K.) c. cxxxviii	2 July 1801
An act for empowering certain trustees therein named, to carry into execution an agreement made by Arthur Annesley of Bletchington Park, in the county of Oxford, esquire, and Thomas Bradford of Ashdown Park, in the county of Sussex, esquire, for the sale of the settled estates of the said Arthur Annesley, situate in the county of York, discharged of the limitations created by his marriage settlement, and to lay out a part of the monies to arise from the sale thereof in paying off certain incumbrances affecting a part of the estates to which the said Arthur Annesley of Bletchington, and his issue male, are entitled under the will of Arthur Annesley late of Lincoln's Inn Fields, esquire, deceased, and other part thereof in the purchase of estates situate in the said county of Oxford, or in the adjoining counties, to be settled to the same uses as by the said settlement are limited concerning the settled estates of the said Arthur Annesley of Bletchington, in the said county of Oxford; and for other purposes.
Carew's Estate Act 1801	41 Geo. 3. (U.K.) c. cxxxix	2 July 1801
An Act for confirming certain Indentures of Lease and Release, dated the Thirteenth and Fourteenth Days of August One thousand seven hundred and ninety five, whereby several Manors and Real Estates late of Sir Nicholas Hackett Carew Baronet, deceased, situate in the County of Surrey, were conveyed upon certain Trusts in such Indentures mentioned; for enabling the Trustees named in the said Indentures to convey, settle and assure the said Manors and Real Estates to certain remaining Uses, conformable to the last Will and Testament of the said Sir Nicholas Hackett Carew; for enabling Richard Carew Esquire, and the successive remaining Takers under the said Will, to grant Leases of the said Real Estates; for vesting certain Parts of the said Real Estates in Trustees, in Trust, to be sold; for authorizing the Sale, Release or Extinguishment of the several Quit Rents, Heriot Rights and other Dues, payable by the Freehold, Copyhold and Customary Tenants of the said Manors respectively; and also the enfranchising or reducing to small Fines certain, the several Customary or Copyhold Estates holden of the same Manors respectively; and for applying the Monies arising by the said matters respectively in the Purchase of other Lands or Hereditaments to be settled to the same Uses.
Downing College Cambridge Act 1801	41 Geo. 3. (U.K.) c. cxl	2 July 1801
An Act for changing the Scite of Downing College, in the University of Cambridge, and for providing a Fund for the Purchase of such Scite, and erecting the proper Buildings thereon.
Wildmore Fen Allotments Act 1801	41 Geo. 3. (U.K.) c. cxli	2 July 1801
An Act for dividing and allotting a certain Fen, called Wildmore Fen, in the County of Lincoln.
East and West Fens Allotments Act 1801	41 Geo. 3. (U.K.) c. cxlii	2 July 1801
An Act for dividing and allotting certain Fens, called The East and West Fens, in the County of Lincoln.
Enfield Inclosure Act 1801	41 Geo. 3. (U.K.) c. cxliii	2 July 1801
An Act for dividing and inclosing the Open and Common Fields, Common Marshes and Lammas Grounds, Chase Allotment, and other Commonable and Waste Lands, within the Parish of Enfield in the County of Middlesex.
Lamesley and Tanfield Inclosure Act 1801	41 Geo. 3. (U.K.) c. cxliv	2 July 1801
An Act for dividing allotting and inclosing certain Commons and other Commonable Lands, in the Parochial Chapelries of Lamesley and Tanfield, or One of them, in the County of Durham.
St. Thomas's Leys or Pembroke Leys Inclosure Act 1801	41 Geo. 3. (U.K.) c. cxlv	2 July 1801
An Act for extinguishing the Rights of Common, and other Rights, in and over certain Lands called Saint Thomas's Leys, otherwise Pembroke Leys, in the several Parishes of Saint Botolph, Saint Andrew the Great, Saint Benedict and Saint Mary the Less, in the Town of Cambridge.
Hill's Estate Act 1801	41 Geo. 3. (U.K.) c. cxlvi	2 July 1801
An Act to alter and amend so much of an Act, passed in the Fortieth Year of the Reign of His present Majesty, intituled, "An Act for dividing, allotting and inclosing the Open and Common Fields, Meadows and Pastures, and other Commonable Lands and Grounds, and also the Waste Lands and Grounds, within the several Parishes of Hanworth, Feltham and Sunbury, in the County of Middlesex," (Note: Hanworth, Feltham, and Sunbury (Middlesex) Inclosure Act 1800 (39 & 40 Geo. 3. c. 51 Pr.)) as authorizes and requires the Commissioners to make a certain Allotment therein mentioned to Edmund Hill as Lord of the said Manor.

=== Private acts ===
Short title	Citation	Royal assent
Long title
King's Brompton, &c. Inclosure Act 1801	41 Geo. 3. (U.K.) c. 1 Pr.	24 March 1801
An act for dividing, allotting, and inclosing, certain commons and waste lands, in the parishes of King's Brompton, Upton, and Skilgate, in the county of Somerset.
Tickenham Inclosure Act 1801	41 Geo. 3. (U.K.) c. 2 Pr.	24 March 1801
An Act for dividing, allotting and inclosing certain Moors, Commons or Waste Lands, lying within the Manor and Parish of Tickenham, in the County of Somerset.
Kinver Inclosure Act 1801	41 Geo. 3. (U.K.) c. 3 Pr.	24 March 1801
An Act for dividing, allotting and inclosing certain Commons or Waste Lands, called Stourton Common, Great Checkhill, and Little Checkhill, within the Manor and Parish of Kniver otherwise Kinfare in the County of Stafford.
De Collogny's Naturalization Act 1801	41 Geo. 3. (U.K.) c. 4 Pr.	24 March 1801
An act for naturalizing Mark Anthony De Collogny.
Boulnois' Naturalization Act 1801	41 Geo. 3. (U.K.) c. 5 Pr.	24 March 1801
An act for naturalizing William Boulnois.
Clementi's Naturalization Act 1801	41 Geo. 3. (U.K.) c. 6 Pr.	24 March 1801
An act for naturalizing Muzio Clementi.
Revely's Estate Act 1801	41 Geo. 3. (U.K.) c. 7 Pr.	2 April 1801
An act for vesting the timber, and other trees, on the estates in the county of Northumberland, devised by the will of Henry Revely esquire, in trustees, for certain purposes therein mentioned.
Weedon Inclosure Act 1801	41 Geo. 3. (U.K.) c. 8 Pr.	2 April 1801
An Act for dividing, allotting and inclosing the Open and Common Fields, Common Meadows, Common Pastures, and other Commonable and Waste Lands, Grounds and Places, within the Hamlet of Weedon, in the Parish of Hardwicke, in the County of Buckingham.
Little Useburn Inclosure Act 1801	41 Geo. 3. (U.K.) c. 9 Pr.	2 April 1801
An Act for dividing, allotting and inclosing the Open Common Fields, Ings, Carr Lands, Stinted Pastures, Commonable Places and Wastes, within the Manor and Township of Little Useburn, in the West Riding of the County of York.
Whixley Inclosure Act 1801	41 Geo. 3. (U.K.) c. 10 Pr.	2 April 1801
An Act for dividing and inclosing the several Open Arable Fields, Stinted Pastures, Commons and Commonable Lands and Waste Grounds, within the Manor and Township of Whixley, in the Parish of Whixley, in the West Riding of the County of York.
Staveley Inclosure Act 1801	41 Geo. 3. (U.K.) c. 11 Pr.	2 April 1801
An Act for dividing and inclosing the several Open Arable Fields, Stinted Pastures, Ings, Carrs, Commons, Commonable Lands and Waste Grounds, within the Parish of Staveley, in the West Riding of the County of York.
Framwelgate, &c. Inclosure Act 1801 (repealed)	41 Geo. 3. (U.K.) c. 12 Pr.	2 April 1801
An Act for dividing and inclosing certain Moors, Commons or Tracts of Waste Land, and Two Parcels of Ground called The Intack or Cow Pasture, and Shaw Wood, within the several Townships of Framwellgate and Witton Gilbert, and in the several Manors of Chester and Lanchester, in the County Palatine of Durham, and for extinguishing all Right of Common in certain inclosed Intercommon Lands within the several Townships of Framwellgate and Witton Gilbert aforefaid. (Repealed by Durham City Council Act 1985 (c. xxix))
East Harling Inclosure Act 1801	41 Geo. 3. (U.K.) c. 13 Pr.	2 April 1801
An Act for dividing, allotting and inclosing the Whole Year and old inclosed Lands, Open and Common Fields, Half Year or Shack Lands, Fens, Commons and Waste Grounds, within the Parish of East Harling, in the County of Norfolk.
West Bromwich Inclosure Act 1801	41 Geo. 3. (U.K.) c. 14 Pr.	2 April 1801
An Act for dividing, allotting and inclosing the several Open Common Fields, Common Pastures, Commons and Waste Lands, within the Manor and Parish of West Bromwich, in the County of Stafford.
Gram's Naturalization Act 1801	41 Geo. 3. (U.K.) c. 15 Pr.	2 April 1801
An Act for naturalizing Andrew Gram.
Weltje's Naturalization Act 1801	41 Geo. 3. (U.K.) c. 16 Pr.	2 April 1801
An Act for naturalizing Amelia Weltje.
Engstrôm's Naturalization Act 1801	41 Geo. 3. (U.K.) c. 17 Pr.	2 April 1801
An Act for naturalizing Hans Peter Engstrôm.
Walther's Naturalization Act 1801	41 Geo. 3. (U.K.) c. 18 Pr.	2 April 1801
An Act for naturalizing Henry Walther.
Littlebury Inclosure Act 1801	41 Geo. 3. (U.K.) c. 19 Pr.	18 April 1801
An Act for dividing, allotting and inclosing the Open and Common Fields, Meadows, Pastures, Wastes and other Commonable Lands and Grounds, within the Parish of Littlebury, in the County of Essex.
Hooffstetter's Naturalization Act 1801	41 Geo. 3. (U.K.) c. 20 Pr.	18 April 1801
An Act for naturalizing Daniel Hooffstetter.
Great and Little Cressingham (Norfolk) Inclosure Act 1801	41 Geo. 3. (U.K.) c. 21 Pr.	30 April 1801
An act for dividing, allotting, and inclosing the whole year lands, common fields, half year or shack lands, commonable grounds, lammas meadows, whin lots, or doles, heaths, commons, and waste lands, within the parish of Great Cressingham, in the county of Norfolk, and certain open and inclosed fields and half year or shack lands, meadows, and pastures, lying in the said parish, and in the parish of Little Cressingham, in the said county.
Happisburgh and Lessingham (Norfolk) Inclosure Act 1801	41 Geo. 3. (U.K.) c. 22 Pr.	30 April 1801
An act for dividing, allotting, and inclosing the open and common fields, half year or shack lands, commons, severals, and waste grounds, within the parishes of Happisburgh and Lessingham, in the county of Norfolk; and for extinguishing all rights of sheepwalk and shackage in, over, and upon the lands and grounds within the said parish of Happisburgh.
Worle Inclosure Act 1801	41 Geo. 3. (U.K.) c. 23 Pr.	30 April 1801
An act for dividing, allotting, and inclosing certain moors, commons, or waste lands, lying and being within the manor and parish of Worle, in the county of Somerset.
Hertingfordbury Inclosure Act 1801	41 Geo. 3. (U.K.) c. 24 Pr.	30 April 1801
An act for dividing, allotting, and inclosing the open and common fields, common meadows, common pastures, and other commonable lands and grounds, in the parish of Hertingfordbury, in the county of Hertford.
Duckworth's Divorce Act 1801	41 Geo. 3. (U.K.) c. 25 Pr.	30 April 1801
An Act to dissolve the Marriage of George Duckworth with Mary Grundy his now Wife, and to enable him to marry again; and for other purposes therein mentioned.
Taylor's Divorce Act 1801	41 Geo. 3. (U.K.) c. 26 Pr.	30 April 1801
An Act to dissolve the Marriage of George Taylor Gentleman, with Catherine Birchall Taylor his now Wife, and to enable him to marry again; and for other purposes therein mentioned.
Weippert's Naturalization Act 1801	41 Geo. 3. (U.K.) c. 27 Pr.	30 April 1801
An Act for naturalizing John Erhardt Weippert.
Langley's Estate Act 1801	41 Geo. 3. (U.K.) c. 28 Pr.	21 May 1801
An Act for vesting a certain Messuage and Premises in King's Lynn, in the County of Norfolk, (being an Estate devised by the Will of William Langley deceased, in strict Settlement,) in Trustees, to be sold and conveyed to Samuel Baker Esquire, and his Heirs, and for laying out the Money arising from such Sale in the Purchase of other Lands and Hereditaments, to be settled to the same Uses to which the said Messuage and Premises do now stand limited under and by virtue of the said Will.
Keene's Estate Act 1801	41 Geo. 3. (U.K.) c. 29 Pr.	21 May 1801
An Act for vesting the settled Estates of Benjamin Keene Esquire, and Mary his Wife, in new Trustees, in the Room of the Right Honourable Charles Lord Calthorpe an Infant, to the Uses and upon the Trusts of the Settlement made previous to the Marriage of the said Benjamin Keene and Mary his Wife, and for giving a Power to change and appoint new Trustees in future.
Stonesfield Inclosure Act 1801	41 Geo. 3. (U.K.) c. 30 Pr.	21 May 1801
An Act for dividing, allotting and inclosing the Open Common Fields, Common Pastures, Commonable Lands, Commons and Waste Grounds, within the Parish of Stonesfield, in the County of Oxford.
South Ferriby Inclosure Act 1801	41 Geo. 3. (U.K.) c. 31 Pr.	21 May 1801
An act for dividing, allotting, and inclosing the open common fields, meadows, pastures, and other commonable lands and waste grounds, in the parish of South Ferriby in the county of Lincoln.
East Halton Inclosure Act 1801	41 Geo. 3. (U.K.) c. 32 Pr.	21 May 1801
An act for dividing, allotting, and inclosing the open common fields, meadows, pastures, and other commonable lands and waste grounds, in the parish of East Halton, in the county of Lincoln.
Hemingford Inclosure Act 1801	41 Geo. 3. (U.K.) c. 33 Pr.	21 May 1801
An Act for dividing, allotting and inclosing the Open and Common Fields, Meadows, Lands, Commons and Commonable Places, within the several Parishes of Heming ford Grey and Heming ford Abbotts, in the County of Huntingdon.
Wrestlingworth Inclosure Act 1801	41 Geo. 3. (U.K.) c. 34 Pr.	21 May 1801
An act for dividing, allotting, and inclosing the open and common fields, meadows, pastures, wades, and other commonable lands and grounds, within the parish of Wrestlingworth, in the county of Bedford; and for allotting a part of Hatley Field in lieu of such parts of the same field as are situate in the said parish of Wrestlingworth.
Belchford Inclosure Act 1801	41 Geo. 3. (U.K.) c. 35 Pr.	21 May 1801
An Act for dividing, allotting, improving and inclosing the Open Arable Fields, Meadows, Pastures, and other Commonable and Waste Lands, in the Parish of Belchford, in the County of Lincoln.
Sotby Inclosure Act 1801	41 Geo. 3. (U.K.) c. 36 Pr.	21 May 1801
An act for dividing, allotting, inclosing, and improving the open arable fields, meadows, pastures, and other commonable and waste lands, within the parish of Sotby, in the county of Lincoln.
Manningford Bruce Inclosure Act 1801	41 Geo. 3. (U.K.) c. 37 Pr.	21 May 1801
An act for dividing and allotting several open and common fields and downs, and other open and commonable lands and waste grounds, in the parish of Manningford Bruce, in the county of Wilts.
Kentismoore Inclosure Act 1801	41 Geo. 3. (U.K.) c. 38 Pr.	21 May 1801
An act for dividing, allotting, and inclosing a certain tract of common or waste land called Kentismoore, Within the manor and parish of Ktntisheere, in the county of Devon.
Turnworth Inclosure Act 1801	41 Geo. 3. (U.K.) c. 39 Pr.	21 May 1801
An Act for dividing, allotting and inclosing the Open and Common Fields, Common Downs, Commons and Waste Lands, in the Parish of Turnwood, otherwise Turnworth, in the County of Dorset.
Little Staughton Inclosure Act 1801	41 Geo. 3. (U.K.) c. 40 Pr.	21 May 1801
An Act for dividing, allotting and inclosing certain Open and Common Fields, Meadows, Lands, Commons and Commonable Places, within the Parish of Little Staughton, in the County of Bedford.
Ewell Inclosure Act 1801	41 Geo. 3. (U.K.) c. 41 Pr.	21 May 1801
An act for dividing and inclosing the common fields, common meadows, commons, and waste lands, within the parish of Ewell, in the county of Surrey.
Balsham Inclosure Act 1801	41 Geo. 3. (U.K.) c. 42 Pr.	21 May 1801
An Act for dividing, allotting and inclosing the Open and Common Fields, Meadows, Pastures, Wastes and other Commonable Lands and Grounds, within the Parish of Balsham, in the County of Cambridge.
Drayton Inclosure Act 1801	41 Geo. 3. (U.K.) c. 43 Pr.	21 May 1801
An act for dividing, allotting, and inclosing the open and common field, and other commonable lands and grounds, within the parish of Drayton, in the county of Oxford.
Stanton Inclosure Act 1801	41 Geo. 3. (U.K.) c. 44 Pr.	21 May 1801
An Act for dividing, allotting and inclosing the several Commons and Waste Grounds within the Lordship or Liberty of Stanton, in the Parish of Ellaston, in the County of Stafford.
Old Hurst Inclosure Act 1801	41 Geo. 3. (U.K.) c. 45 Pr.	21 May 1801
An Act for dividing, allotting and inclosing certain Open and Common Fields, Meadows, Lands, Commons and Commonable Places, within the Parish of Old Hurst, in the County of Huntingdon.
Thorpe Abbotts Inclosure Act 1801	41 Geo. 3. (U.K.) c. 46 Pr.	21 May 1801
An act for dividing, allotting, and inclosing the commons and waste lands within the parish of Thorpe Abbotts, in the county of Norfolk.
Alburgh and Wortwell (Norfolk) Inclosure Act 1801	41 Geo. 3. (U.K.) c. 47 Pr.	21 May 1801
An act for dividing, allotting, and inclosing the commonable fen lands, commons, and waste grounds, within the parish of Alburgh, and hamlet of Wortwell, in the county of Norfolk.
Stanground Inclosure Act 1801	41 Geo. 3. (U.K.) c. 48 Pr.	21 May 1801
An Act for dividing, allotting, inclosing and otherwise improving the Open Fields, Open Meadows, Commons and Wastes, within the Parish of Stanground with Farcet, in the Counties of Huntingdon and Cambridge, and in the Isle of Ely.
Knudson's Naturalization Act 1801	41 Geo. 3. (U.K.) c. 49 Pr.	21 May 1801
An Act for naturalizing Saint George Knudson.
Emley's Naturalization Act 1801	41 Geo. 3. (U.K.) c. 50 Pr.	21 May 1801
An Act for naturalizing Joseph Emley.
Volckers' Naturalization Act 1801	41 Geo. 3. (U.K.) c. 51 Pr.	21 May 1801
An Act for naturalizing Peter Hinrich Volckers.
Earl of Abergavenny's Estate Act 1801	41 Geo. 3. (U.K.) c. 52 Pr.	20 June 1801
An Act for enabling Henry Nevill, Earl of Abergavenny, to grant a new Lease of certain Mines and Hereditaments, in the County of Monmouth.
Blofield, &c. Inclosure Act 1801	41 Geo. 3. (U.K.) c. 53 Pr.	20 June 1801
An Act for dividing, allotting and inclosing the Open Fields, Commons and Waste Grounds, within the Parishes of Blofield and Hemblington, in the County of Norfolk.
Beighton, &c. Inclosure Act 1801	41 Geo. 3. (U.K.) c. 54 Pr.	20 June 1801
An Act for dividing, allotting and inclosing the Commons and Waste Grounds, in the Parishes of Beighton, Lingwood, and Moulton, in the County of Norfolk.
Boughton Inclosure Act 1801	41 Geo. 3. (U.K.) c. 55 Pr.	20 June 1801
An Act for dividing, allotting and inclosing the Common Fields, Half Year or Shack Lands, Commonable Grounds, Commons and Waste Lands, within the Parish of Boughton, in the County of Norfolk.
Cavenham Inclosure Act 1801	41 Geo. 3. (U.K.) c. 56 Pr.	20 June 1801
An act for dividing, allotting, and inclosing the fen grounds, heaths, commons, and waste lands, within the parish of Cavenham, in the county of Suffolk,
Dunkeswell Inclosure Act 1801	41 Geo. 3. (U.K.) c. 57 Pr.	20 June 1801
An act for dividing, allotting, and inclosing all the commons and waste lands within the manor and parish of Dunkeswell, in the county of Devon.
Bergh Apton, &c. Inclosure Act 1801	41 Geo. 3. (U.K.) c. 58 Pr.	20 June 1801
An Act for dividing, allotting and inclosing the Commons and Waste Grounds in the Parishes of Bergh Apton, Thurton, Yelverton, Alpington and Holveston, in the County of Norfolk.
Mattishall Inclosure Act 1801	41 Geo. 3. (U.K.) c. 59 Pr.	20 June 1801
An act for dividing, allotting, and inclosing the open fields, commons, and waste lands, within the parish of Mattishall, in the county of Norfolk.
Stradset Inclosure Act 1801	41 Geo. 3. (U.K.) c. 60 Pr.	20 June 1801
An Act for dividing, allotting and inclosing the Commons and Waste Lands within the Parish of Stradset, in the County of Norfolk.
Great Abington Inclosure Act 1801	41 Geo. 3. (U.K.) c. 61 Pr.	20 June 1801
An Act for dividing, allotting, inclosing, and laying in Severalty, the Open and Common Fields, Common Meadows, Commonable Lands, Common Heaths, Commons and Waste Grounds, within the Parish of Great Abington, in the County of Cambridge.
Carlton Colville, &c. Inclosure Act 1801	41 Geo. 3. (U.K.) c. 62 Pr.	20 June 1801
An Act for dividing and inclosing the Common Heaths, Marshes, Fen Grounds, Dooles and Waste Lands, within the several Parishes of Carlton Colvile, Oulton and Kirtley otherwise Kirkley, in the County of Suffolk.
Castle Froome and Long Froomy (Herefordshire) Inclosure Act 1801	41 Geo. 3. (U.K.) c. 63 Pr.	20 June 1801
An act for dividing, allotting, and inclosing the open fields and waste lands in the parish of Castle Froome, in the county of Hereford, and also a certain common meadow, called Long Froomy, situate in the said parish of Castle Froome, and the several parishes of Bishop's Froome, Much Cowarne, and Evesbach, in the said county of Hereford.
Risby and Fornham All Saints (Suffolk) Inclosure Act 1801	41 Geo. 3. (U.K.) c. 64 Pr.	20 June 1801
An act for dividing, allotting, and inclosing the open and common fields, lammas, and other commonable meadow, heaths, commons, and waste grounds, within the several parishes of Risby and Fornham All Saints, in the county of Suffolk.
Erdington, &c. Inclosure Act 1801	41 Geo. 3. (U.K.) c. 65 Pr.	20 June 1801
An Act for dividing, allotting and inclosing the Open Fields, Meadows, Pastures, Commons and Waste Lands, within the Manors of Erdington and Witton, in the Parish of Aston juxta Birmingham, in the County of Warwick.
Bassingbourne Inclosure Act 1801	41 Geo. 3. (U.K.) c. 66 Pr.	20 June 1801
An Act for dividing, allotting and inclosing the Open and Common Fields, Meadows, Pastures, Wastes and other Commonable Lands and Grounds, within the Parish of Bassingbourne, in the County of Cambridge.
Holme Hale and West Bradenham (Norfolk) Inclosure Act 1801	41 Geo. 3. (U.K.) c. 67 Pr.	20 June 1801
An act for dividing, allotting, and inclosing the whole year inclosures, open fields, commonable grounds, commons, and waste lands, within the parishes of Holme Hale and West Bradenham, in the county of Norfolk.
Watton and Carbrooke (Norfolk) Inclosure Act 1801	41 Geo. 3. (U.K.) c. 68 Pr.	20 June 1801
An act for dividing, allotting, and inclosing the open or common fields, half year or shack lands, lammas meadows, fens, commons, and waste lands, within the several parishes of Watton and Carbrooke, in the county of Norfolk.
Kettlewell and Conistone (Yorkshire, West Riding) Inclosure Act 1801	41 Geo. 3. (U.K.) c. 69 Pr.	20 June 1801
An act for inclosing, and reducing to a stint, the several commons or moors, called Kettlewell Commons and Conistone Moor, and for dividing and inclosing several stinted pastures, open fields, and waste grounds, within the several townships of Kettlewell and Conistone, in Kettlewell-dale, in the west riding of the county of York.
Wilby Inclosure Act 1801	41 Geo. 3. (U.K.) c. 70 Pr.	20 June 1801
An Act for dividing and inclosing the Open and Common Fields, Pastures, Meadows, Commonable Lands and Waste Grounds, within the Parish of Wilby, in the County of Northampton.
Lower Heyford and Calcot Inclosure Act 1801	41 Geo. 3. (U.K.) c. 71 Pr.	20 June 1801
An act for dividing, allotting, and inclosing the open and common fields, common meadows, common pastures, commons, waste, and other commonable lands and grounds, within the liberties and precincts of Lower Heyford otherwise Heyford-at-Bridge, and Calcott, in the parish of Lower Heyford otherwise Heyford-at-Bridge, in the county of Oxford.
Headington Inclosure Act 1801	41 Geo. 3. (U.K.) c. 72 Pr.	20 June 1801
An act for dividing, allotting, and laying in severalty; the open and common fields, common pastures, common meadows, commons, and waste grounds, within the parish of Headington, in the county of Oxford.
Little Coxwell Inclosure Act 1801	41 Geo. 3. (U.K.) c. 73 Pr.	20 June 1801
An act for dividing, allotting, and inclosing the open and common fields, common meadows, common pastures, and other commonable lands, within the hamlet or township of Little Coxwell, in the parish of Great Farringdon, in the county of Berks.
Charlton Inclosure Act 1801	41 Geo. 3. (U.K.) c. 74 Pr.	20 June 1801
An act for dividing, allotting, and laying in severalty, the open and common fields, downs, meadows, and waste lands, within the tything of Charlton, in the manor and parish of Downton, in the country of Wilts.
Aldenham Inclosure Act 1801	41 Geo. 3. (U.K.) c. 75 Pr.	20 June 1801
An Act for dividing, allotting and inclosing the Open and Common Fields, Commons and Waste Lands, in the Parish of Aldenham, in the County of Hertford.
Thirwall in Haltwhistle (Northumberland) Inclosure Act 1801	41 Geo. 3. (U.K.) c. 76 Pr.	20 June 1801
An act for dividing, alloting, and inclosing the moors, commons and waste grounds, within the manor of Thirlwall, in the parish of Haltwhistle in the county of Northumberland.
Castlecarrock, Barony of Gilsland (Cumberland) Inclosure Act 1801	41 Geo. 3. (U.K.) c. 77 Pr.	20 June 1801
An act for dividing, allotting, and inclosing the moors, commons, and waste grounds, in the manor and parish of Castlecarrock, within, and parcel of, the barony of Gilsland, in the county of Cumberland.
Langtoft and Baston (Lincolnshire) Inclosure Act 1801	41 Geo. 3. (U.K.) c. 78 Pr.	20 June 1801
An act for dividing, allotting, and inclosing the several open common fields, meadows, wastes, and other commonable lands, within and belonging to the several parishes of Langtoft and Baston, in the county of Lincoln.
West Deeping and Tallington (Lincolnshire) Inclosure Act 1801	41 Geo. 3. (U.K.) c. 79 Pr.	20 June 1801
An act for dividing, allotting, and inclosing the open common fields, meadows, common fens, wastes, and other commonable lands and grounds, within and belonging to the several parishes of West Deeping and Tallington, in the county of Lincoln.
Weaverthorp, &c. Inclosure Act 1801	41 Geo. 3. (U.K.) c. 80 Pr.	20 June 1801
An Act for dividing and inclosing the several Open Common Fields, Lands, Pastures, Leys, Commons and other Waste Lands and Grounds, within the several Townships of Weaverthorp, Helperthorp, East Lutton and West Lutton, otherwise Luttons Ambo, all in the Parish of Weaverthorp, in the East Riding in the County of York, and for making a Compensation in lieu of the Tythes thereof, and also of the Tythes of the ancient Messuages, Cottages, Frontsteads and inclosed Lands, within the same Townships respectively.
Skellow Inclosure Act 1801	41 Geo. 3. (U.K.) c. 81 Pr.	20 June 1801
An act for dividing, allotting, inclosing, and improving the several open fields, ings, commons, and waste grounds, within the manor and township of Skellow, in the parish of Owston, in the west riding of the county of York.
Slimbridge Inclosure Act 1801	41 Geo. 3. (U.K.) c. 82 Pr.	20 June 1801
An Act for dividing, allotting and inclosing the Common Fields, Common Meadows, Open, Intermixed and Commonable Lands and Waste Grounds, in the Parish of Slimbridge, in the County of Gloucester, and for allotting and exchanging certain Lands lying in the adjoining Parishes of Cam and Coaley, in the same County.
Lyford Inclosure Act 1801	41 Geo. 3. (U.K.) c. 83 Pr.	20 June 1801
An Act for dividing and inclosing the Open and Common Fields, Common Pastures, Commons and Waste Lands, within the Hamlet of Lyford, in the Parish of Hanney, in the County of Berks.
Braunston Inclosure Act 1801	41 Geo. 3. (U.K.) c. 84 Pr.	20 June 1801
An Act for dividing, allotting and inclosing the Open and Common Fields, Meadows, Pastures and all other Uninclosed Lands and Grounds, in the Parish of Braunston, in the County of Rutland.
Covington Inclosure Act 1801	41 Geo. 3. (U.K.) c. 85 Pr.	20 June 1801
An Act for dividing and inclosing the Open and Common Fields, Commons and Waste Lands, in the Parish of Covington, in the County of Huntingdon.
Hadstock Inclosure Act 1801	41 Geo. 3. (U.K.) c. 86 Pr.	20 June 1801
An act for dividing, allotting, and inclosing the open and common fields, meadows, pastures, wastes, and other commonable lands and grounds, within the parish of Hadstock, in the county of Essex.
North Frodingham Inclosure Act 1801	41 Geo. 3. (U.K.) c. 87 Pr.	20 June 1801
An Act for dividing, allotting and inclosing the Open Arable Fields, Meadows, Pastures, Carrs, Common and Waste Lands, within the Township of North Frodingham, in the Parish of North Frodingham, in the East Riding of the County of York, and for making a Compensation in lieu of the Tithes thereof, and of ancient inclosed Lands in the same Township.
Coulton Inclosure Act 1801	41 Geo. 3. (U.K.) c. 88 Pr.	20 June 1801
An act for dividing, allotting, and inclosing the commons and waste grounds within the parish of Coulton, in the county of Norfolk.
Denchworth Inclosure Act 1801	41 Geo. 3. (U.K.) c. 89 Pr.	20 June 1801
An act for dividing and inclosing the open arable fields, common pastures, commons, and waste grounds, within the parish of Denchworth, in the county of Berks.
Great Chesterford Inclosure Act 1801	41 Geo. 3. (U.K.) c. 90 Pr.	20 June 1801
An Act for dividing, allotting and inclosing the Open and Common Fields, Meadows, Pastures, Wastes and other Commonable Lands and Grounds, within the Parish of Great Chesterford, in the County of Essex.
Little Chesterford Inclosure Act 1801	41 Geo. 3. (U.K.) c. 91 Pr.	20 June 1801
An act for dividing, allotting, and inclosing the open and common fields, meadows, pastures, wastes, and other commonable lands and grounds, within the parish of Little Chesterford, in the county of Essex.
Ruston Parva Inclosure Act 1801	41 Geo. 3. (U.K.) c. 92 Pr.	20 June 1801
An act for dividing, allotting, and inclosing the open common fields, common pastures, and other commonable lands and grounds, within the township of Ruston Parva otherwise Little Ruston, in the east riding of the county of York.
Langtoft Inclosure Act 1801	41 Geo. 3. (U.K.) c. 93 Pr.	20 June 1801
An act for dividing, allotting, and inclosing the open common fields, common pastures, and other commonable lands and grounds, within the township of Langtoft, in the parish of Langtoft upon the Wolds, in the east riding of the county of York.
Sutton Courtney and Sutton Wick (Berkshire) Inclosure Act 1801	41 Geo. 3. (U.K.) c. 94 Pr.	20 June 1801
An act for dividing, allotting, laying in severalty, and inclosing the open and common fields, common meadows, common pastures, commonable lands, and waste grounds, within the parish of Sutton Courtney, and the hamlet of Sutton Wick, in the same parish, in the county of Berks.
Paas's Naturalization Act 1801	41 Geo. 3. (U.K.) c. 95 Pr.	20 June 1801
An Act for naturalizing Cornelius Paas.
Baum's Naturalization Act 1801	41 Geo. 3. (U.K.) c. 96 Pr.	20 June 1801
An Act for naturalizing John Daniel Baum.
Winska's Naturalization Act 1801	41 Geo. 3. (U.K.) c. 97 Pr.	20 June 1801
An Act for naturalizing Elizabeth Winska.
Barkway and Reed Division and Allotment Act 1801	41 Geo. 3. (U.K.) c. 98 Pr.	23 June 1801
An Act for dividing, allotting and laying in Severalty, certain Common and Open Fields, Common Meadows, Commonable Lands, Commons and Waste Grounds, lying within the Parishes of Barkway and Reed, and the Hamlets thereto belonging, in the County of Hertford, and for extinguishing all Rights of Common, Sheepwalk and Shackage, in, over and upon the Lands and Grounds within the said Parishes and Hamlets.
Molescroft Inclosure Act 1801	41 Geo. 3. (U.K.) c. 99 Pr.	23 June 1801
An Act for dividing, allotting and inclosing the Open Fields and Common or Car, within the Township of Molscroft, in the Parish of Saint John of Beverley, in the East Riding of the County of York; and for making a Compensation in lieu of the Tithes thereof, and of certain ancient inclosed Lands in the same Township.
Lavendon, &c. Inclosure Act 1801	41 Geo. 3. (U.K.) c. 100 Pr.	23 June 1801
An Act for dividing and inclosing the Common and Open Fields, Meadows, Pastures, Commonable Lands and Waste Grounds within the Parishes of Lavendon and Brayfield otherwise Cold Brayfield, in the County of Buckingham.
Down Ampney, &c. Inclosure Act 1801	41 Geo. 3. (U.K.) c. 101 Pr.	23 June 1801
An Act for dividing, allotting and laying in Severalty, the Open and Common Lands and Grounds within the Parishes of Down Ampney, in the County of Gloucester, and Latton and Eisey, in the County of Wilts
Campbell's Divorce Act 1801	41 Geo. 3. (U.K.) c. 102 Pr.	23 June 1801
An Act to dissolve the Marriage of Jane Campbell with Edward Addison her now Husband, on account of his incestuous Adultery with the Sifter of the said Jane Campbell, and to enable the said Jane Campbell to marry again; and for other purposes therein mentioned.
Court's Naturalization Act 1801	41 Geo. 3. (U.K.) c. 103 Pr.	23 June 1801
An Act for naturalizing David Court.
Pfeil's Naturalization Act 1801	41 Geo. 3. (U.K.) c. 104 Pr.	23 June 1801
An Act for naturalizing John William Pfeil.
Harre's Naturalization Act 1801	41 Geo. 3. (U.K.) c. 105 Pr.	23 June 1801
An Act for naturalizing William Harre.
Suthmier's Naturalization Act 1801	41 Geo. 3. (U.K.) c. 106 Pr.	23 June 1801
An Act for naturalizing Henry Suthmier.
Haring's Naturalization Act 1801	41 Geo. 3. (U.K.) c. 107 Pr.	23 June 1801
An Act for naturalizing John Haring.
Cheltenham Inclosure Act 1801	41 Geo. 3. (U.K.) c. 108 Pr.	24 June 1801
An Act for dividing, allotting and inclosing the Open and Common Fields, Common Meadows, Common Pastures and other Commonable and Waste Lands, within the Tithing or Hamlet of Cheltenham, in the County of Gloucester.
Ripple Inclosure Act 1801	41 Geo. 3. (U.K.) c. 109 Pr.	24 June 1801
An Act for dividing, allotting and inclosing certain Open and Common Fields, Common Meadows, Common Pastures, and other Commonable and Waste Lands, within the Parish of Ripple, in the County of Worcester.
Hornsea Inclosure Act 1801	41 Geo. 3. (U.K.) c. 110 Pr.	27 June 1801
An Act for dividing, allotting and inclosing the Open Arable Fields, Meadows, Pastures, Common and Waste Lands, within the Township of Hornsea, in the Parish of Hornsea, in the East Riding of the County of York, and for making a Compensation in lieu of the Tithes thereof, and of ancient inclosed Lands in the same Township.
Kinnersley Inclosure Act 1801	41 Geo. 3. (U.K.) c. 111 Pr.	27 June 1801
An Act for dividing, allotting and inclosing the Commons and Waste Lands in the Parish of Kinnersley, in the County of Hereford.
Histon and Impington Inclosure Act 1801	41 Geo. 3. (U.K.) c. 112 Pr.	27 June 1801
An Act for dividing, allotting and inclosing the Open and Common Fields, Common Meadows, Common Pastures and other Open and Commonable Lands and Waste Grounds, lying in the united Parishes of Histon Saint Andrew and Histon Saint Etheldred, and of Impington, in the County of Cambridge.
Wilsford Inclosure Act 1801	41 Geo. 3. (U.K.) c. 113 Pr.	27 June 1801
An Act for dividing and allotting in Severalty the Open and Common Fields and Downs, Common Meadows, Common Pastures and Commonable and Waste Lands, in or belonging to the Parish, Manors or Tithings of Wilsford, otherwise Willsford Dauntsey, otherwise Willesford Dauntsey, in the County of Wilts.
St. Ives Inclosure Act 1801	41 Geo. 3. (U.K.) c. 114 Pr.	27 June 1801
An Act for dividing, allotting and inclosing the Open Fields, Meadows, Commons and Waste Grounds within the Parish of Saint Ives, in the County of Huntingdon.
Staxton Inclosure Act 1801	41 Geo. 3. (U.K.) c. 115 Pr.	27 June 1801
An Act for dividing, allotting and inclosing the Open Arable Fields, Pastures, Cars, Common and Waste Lands, within the Township of Staxton, in the Parish of Willerby, in the East Riding of the County of York, and for making a Compensation in lieu of the Tithes thereof, and of the ancient inclosed Lands in the same Township, and also of Lands within the Townships of Binnington and Willerby, in the Parish of Willerby aforesaid.
Little Weeton, &c. Inclosure Act 1801	41 Geo. 3. (U.K.) c. 116 Pr.	27 June 1801
An Act for dividing, allotting and inclosing the Open Fields, Sheep Walks, Commons and Waste Grounds, in Little Weeton and Riplingham, within the Township of Little Weeton, in the Parish of Rowley, in the East Riding of the County of York; and for making a Compensation in lieu of the Tithes thereof, and of ancient inclosed Lands in Little Weeton, Riplingham and Hunsley, in the same Township, Parish and Riding.
Little Bytham, &c. Inclosure Act 1801	41 Geo. 3. (U.K.) c. 117 Pr.	27 June 1801
An Act for dividing, allotting and inclosing the Open Common Fields, Meadows, Heaths, Wastes and other Commonable Lands and Grounds, within the Parish of Little Bytham, and the Hamlet of Aunby, in the County of Lincoln.
Letcombe Regis Inclosure Act 1801	41 Geo. 3. (U.K.) c. 118 Pr.	27 June 1801
An Act for dividing, allotting, laying in Severalty, and inclosing the Open and Common Arable Lands, Common Meadow, Common Pasture, Common Down, Waste and other Commonable Lands and Grounds, within the Township of Letcomb Regis, and in the Hamlet of East Challow, in the Parish of Letcomb Regis, in the County of Berks, and a Common Meadow called White Mead, in Letcomb Regis and East Challow aforesaid, and in the Hamlet of West Challow, in the said Parish of Letcomb Regis, and in the Parish of Letcomb Basset, in the same County.
Campbell's Divorce Act 1801	41 Geo. 3. (U.K.) c. 119 Pr.	27 June 1801
An Act to dissolve the Marriage of James Campbell of Calcutta, in the Province of Bengal, in the East Indies, Doctor of Physic, with Jeffy Campbell his now Wife, and to enable him to marry again; and for other purposes therein mentioned.
Wittekind and Werner's Naturalization Act 1801	41 Geo. 3. (U.K.) c. 120 Pr.	27 June 1801
An Act for naturalizing Henry Anthony Wittekind and Christopher Henry Werner.
Goold's Estate Act 1801	41 Geo. 3. (U.K.) c. 121 Pr.	2 July 1801
An Act for enabling Henry Michael Goold Esquire to charge certain Sums of Money with a Jointure to Eleanor Hawkins Spinster, his intended Wife, notwithstanding their respective Minorities.
Chelveston Inclosure Act 1801	41 Geo. 3. (U.K.) c. 122 Pr.	2 July 1801
An Act for dividing, allotting and inclosing the Open and Common Fields, Meadows, Commonable Lands and Waste Grounds in the Parish of Chelston, otherwise Chelveston cum Caldecott, in the County of Northampton.
Frimley Inclosure Act 1801	41 Geo. 3. (U.K.) c. 123 Pr.	2 July 1801
An Act for dividing, allotting and inclosing the Waste Grounds and Commons, or Commonable Lands, within the Manor of Frimley, in the Parish of Ash, in the County of Surrey.
Scremby Inclosure Act 1801	41 Geo. 3. (U.K.) c. 124 Pr.	2 July 1801
An Act for dividing, allotting and inclosing the Open Common Fields, Meadows, Pastures and other Commonable Lands and Waste Grounds, within the Parish of Scremby, in the County of Lincoln.
Little Abington Inclosure Act 1801	41 Geo. 3. (U.K.) c. 125 Pr.	2 July 1801
An Act for dividing, allotting, inclosing, and laying in Severalty, the Open and Common Fields, Common Meadows, Commonable Lands, Common Heaths, Commons and Waste Grounds, within the Parish of Little Abington, in the County of Cambridge.
Fetcham Inclosure Act 1801	41 Geo. 3. (U.K.) c. 126 Pr.	2 July 1801
An Act for dividing, allotting and inclosing the Open Common Fields, Common Downs, Commons and Waste Grounds, in the Parish of Fetcham, in the County of Surrey.
Bottisham Inclosure Act 1801	41 Geo. 3. (U.K.) c. 127 Pr.	2 July 1801
An Act for allotting, inclosing and laying in Severalty, the Common and Open Fields, Common Meadows, Commonable Lands, Commons, Heaths and Waste Grounds, within the Parish of Bottisham, in the County of Cambridge.
Trumpington Inclosure Act 1801	41 Geo. 3. (U.K.) c. 128 Pr.	2 July 1801
An Act for allotting, inclosing and laying in Severalty, the Common and Open Fields, Common Meadows, Commonable Lands, Commons and Waste Grounds, within the Parish of Trumpington, in the County of Cambridge.
Tolleshunt Major Inclosure Act 1801	41 Geo. 3. (U.K.) c. 129 Pr.	2 July 1801
An Act for dividing, allotting and inclosing the Open Common Heath and Waste Ground, and other Commonable Places in the Parish of Tolleshunt Major, otherwise Tolleshunt Beckingham, in the County of Essex.
Hayes's Divorce Act 1801	41 Geo. 3. (U.K.) c. 130 Pr.	2 July 1801
An Act to dissolve the Marriage of George Hayes with Christian Jones his now Wife, and to enable him to marry again; and for other purposes therein mentioned.
Ubele's Naturalization Act 1801	41 Geo. 3. (U.K.) c. 131 Pr.	2 July 1801
An Act for naturalizing John Christian Ubele.

=== Sources ===
- The Statutes at Large. Vol. 43, Part 1. 41 George III. 1801. Cambridge: Cambridge University Press. 1801 – via Internet Archive.
- The Statutes at Large. Vol. 43, Part 1. 41 George III. 1801. Cambridge: Cambridge University Press. 1801 – via Google Books.
- Raithby, John (1802). "41° Geo. III. (U.K.)". The Statutes of the United Kingdom of Great Britain and Ireland. Vol. 1. Containing the Acts 41 Geo. III. (1801.) and 42 Geo. III. (1802.). London: Eyre and Strahan. pp. 1–276 – via Google Books.
- "41° George III. (U.K.)". The Statutes of the United Kingdom of Great Britain and Ireland. Vol. The First. From A.D. 1801, 41 George III.—To AD 1803, 43 George III. London: Eyre and Strahan. 1804. pp. 1–253 – via Google Books.
- "41° George III. (U.K.)". The Statutes of the United Kingdom of Great Britain and Ireland. Vol. The First. From A.D. 1801, 41 George III.—To AD 1803, 43 George III. London: Eyre and Strahan. 1804. pp. 257–653 – via HathiTrust.
- Journal of the House of Commons. Vol. 56. London: His Majesty's Stationery Office. pp. 5–666.
- Chronological Table of and Index to the Statutes. Vol. 1: To the End of the Session 59 Vict. Sess. 2 (1895) (13th ed.). London: Her Majesty's Stationery Office. 1896. pp. 169–171 – via Google Books.
- "Statutes of the United Kingdom of Great Britain and Ireland, 1801". Irish Statute Book. Office of the Attorney General, Government of Ireland.

== 42 Geo. 3 ==
The second session of the 1st Parliament of the United Kingdom, which met from 29 October 1801 until 28 June 1802.

This session was also traditionally cited as 42 G. 3.

=== Public general acts ===
Short title	Citation	Royal assent
Long title
Duties on Malt, etc. Act 1801 (repealed)	42 Geo. 3. c. 1	21 November 1801
An Act for continuing and granting to His Majesty certain Duties upon Malt, Mum, Cyder and Perry, for the Service of the Year One thousand eight hundred and two. (Repealed by Statute Law Revision Act 1872 (35 & 36 Vict. c. 63))
Duties on Pensions, etc. Act 1801 (repealed)	42 Geo. 3. c. 2	21 November 1801
An Act for continuing and granting to His Majesty a Duty on Pensions, Offices and Personal Estates, in England, Wales and the Town of Berwick upon Tweed; and certain Duties on Sugar, Malt, Tobacco and Snuff, for the Service of the Year One thousand eight hundred and two. (Repealed by Statute Law Revision Act 1872 (35 & 36 Vict. c. 63))
Fish Act 1801 (repealed)	42 Geo. 3. c. 3	21 November 1801
An Act to revive and continue until the Twenty fifth Day of March One thousand eight hundred and three, so much of an Act made in the Forty first Year of the Reign of His present Majesty, (Note: Use of Salt Duty Free, etc. Act 1800 (41 Geo. 3. (G.B.) c. 21)) as relates to permitting the Use of Salt, Duty free, in preserving of Fish; and to discontinuing the Bounty payable on White Herrings exported; and to indemnify all Persons who have issued or acted under any Orders for delivering Salt, Duty free, for the Purposes in the said Act mentioned. (Repealed by Sea Fisheries Act 1868 (31 & 32 Vict. c. 45))
Repeal of 41 Geo. 3 (Great Britain) c. 17, etc. Act 1801 (repealed)	42 Geo. 3. c. 4	21 November 1801
An Act to repeal an Act made in the Forty first Year of the Reign of His present Majesty, intituled "An Act to prohibit until the First Day of October One thousand eight hundred and one, and from thence to the End of Six Weeks next after the Commencement of the then next Session of Parliament, any Person or Persons from selling any Bread which shall not have been baked Twenty four Hours;" (Note: Sale of Bread (No. 3) Act 1800 (41 Geo. 3. (G.B.) c. 17)) and to indemnify Bakers and other Persons who have sold or exposed to Sale any Bread within the Time prohibited by the said Act. (Repealed by Statute Law Revision Act 1872 (35 & 36 Vict. c. 63))
Duty on Worts, etc. Act 1801 (repealed)	42 Geo. 3. c. 5	11 December 1801
An Act to continue until the First Day of January One thousand eight hundred and two, so much of an Act made in the Thirty ninth and Fortieth Years of the Reign of His present Majesty (Note: Duties on Spirits Act 1799 (39 & 40 Geo. 3. c. 8)) as relates to the reducing the Duties upon Worts or Wash brewed or made from Melasses or Sugar, or any Mixture therewith, or to any Distiller or Distillers, or Maker or Makers of Spirits; for reviving and continuing for the same Period so much of the said Act as relates to the reducing and better collecting the Duties payable on the Importation of Starch; and for continuing for the same Period an Act (Note: Distillation from Wheat, etc. Act 1799 (39 & 40 Geo. 3. c. 7)) made in the same Session of Parliament for prohibiting the making of Low Wines or Spirits from Wheat, Barley, Malt or other Sort of Grain, or from any Meal, Flour or Bran in Scotland; and so much of an Act made in the last Session of Parliament (Note: Taxation (No. 4) Act 1801 (41 Geo. 3. (U.K.) c. 29)) as relates to allowing the Distillation of Spirits in Scotland from Melasses or Sugar at a lower Rate of Duty. (Repealed by Statute Law Revision Act 1872 (35 & 36 Vict. c. 63))
Lottery Act 1801 (repealed)	42 Geo. 3. c. 6	11 December 1801
An Act to rectify a Mistake in an Act made in the last Session of Parliament, intituled "An Act for granting to His Majesty a certain Sum of Money for the Service of Great Britain, to be raised by a Lottery," (Note: Lottery Act 1801 (41 Geo. 3. (U.K.) c. 27)) and to amend so much of the said Act as relates to the Commencement of the Drawing of the said Lottery. (Repealed by Statute Law Revision Act 1872 (35 & 36 Vict. c. 63))
Importation (No. 2) Act 1801 (repealed)	42 Geo. 3. c. 7	11 December 1801
An Act to repeal an Act made in the Thirty ninth Year of the Reign of His present Majesty, intituled "An Act to permit, until the First Day of August One thousand eight hundred and two, the Importation of certain Naval Stores from Hamburgh and other Ports of Germany." (Note: Importation (No. 6) Act 1799 (39 Geo. 3. c. 111)) (Repealed by Statute Law Revision Act 1872 (35 & 36 Vict. c. 63))
National Debt Act 1801 (repealed)	42 Geo. 3. c. 8	11 December 1801
An Act for granting Annuities to satisfy certain Exchequer Bills. (Repealed by Statute Law Revision Act 1870 (33 & 34 Vict. c. 69))
Loans or Exchequer Bills Act 1801 (repealed)	42 Geo. 3. c. 9	11 December 1801
An Act for raising the Sum of Five Millions by Loans or Exchequer Bills, for the Service of the United Kingdom, for the Year One thousand eight hundred and two. (Repealed by Statute Law Revision Act 1872 (35 & 36 Vict. c. 63))
Prize Act 1801 (repealed)	42 Geo. 3. c. 10	11 December 1801
An Act to revive and continue until the First Day of January One thousand eight hundred and three, an Act made in the Thirty third Year of the Reign of His present Majesty, intituled "An Act for the Relief of the Captors of Prizes with respect to the bringing and landing certain Prize Goods in this Kingdom." (Note: Prize Act 1793 (33 Geo. 3. c. 34)) (Repealed by Statute Law Revision Act 1872 (35 & 36 Vict. c. 63))
Correspondence with Foreign Parts Act 1801 (repealed)	42 Geo. 3. c. 11	11 December 1801
An Act to remove certain Restraints upon the Correspondence by Letter between Persons residing in Great Britain and Ireland, and Persons residing in certain Foreign Countries. (Repealed by Statute Law Revision Act 1872 (35 & 36 Vict. c. 63))
Militia Quotas Act 1801 (repealed)	42 Geo. 3. c. 12	11 December 1801
An Act to regulate until the Twenty fifth Day of March One thousand eight hundred and three, the Number of Private Militia Men in the several Counties, Ridings and Places, therein mentioned; and for supplying of Vacancies in the Militia. (Repealed by Militia Act 1802 (42 Geo. 3. c. 90))
Corn, etc. Act 1801 (repealed)	42 Geo. 3. c. 13	11 December 1801
An Act to continue until the First Day of January One thousand eight hundred and three, and amend an Act of the Thirty ninth Year of the Reign of His present Majesty, (Note: Importation (No. 3) Act 1799 (39 Geo. 3. c. 87)) for prohibiting the Exportation and permitting the Importation of Corn, and for allowing the Importation of other Articles of Provision without Payment of Duty; and to continue for the same Period, an Act of the last Session of Parliament (Note: Exportation, etc. Act 1801 (41 Geo. 3. (U.K.) c. 36)) for prohibiting the Exportation from Ireland of Corn or Potatoes, or other Provisions and for permitting the Importation into Ireland of Corn Fish and Provisions without Payment of Duty. (Repealed by Statute Law Revision Act 1872 (35 & 36 Vict. c. 63))
Manufacture of Starch Act 1801 (repealed)	42 Geo. 3. c. 14	15 December 1801
An Act to permit until the First Day of July One thousand eight hundred and two, the making of Starch from Rice or Potatoes, or any Mixture thereof, and the Importation of any such Starch from Ireland free of Duty. (Repealed by Statute Law Revision Act 1861 (24 & 25 Vict. c. 101))
Distillation from Wheat (Ireland) Act 1801 (repealed)	42 Geo. 3. c. 15	15 December 1801
An Act to prohibit the Distillation of Spirits from Wheat in Ireland. (Repealed by Statute Law Revision Act 1872 (35 & 36 Vict. c. 63))
Importation (No. 3) Act 1801 (repealed)	42 Geo. 3. c. 16	15 December 1801
An Act to continue until the Fifth Day of July One thousand eight hundred and two, an Act made in the Thirty fifth Year of the Reign of His present Majesty (Note: Importation (No. 2) Act 1795 (35 Geo. 3. c. 100)) for preventing the Importation of organzined Thrown Silk, Flax and Flax Seed, into this Kingdom, in Ships or Vessels belonging to any Kingdom or State in Amity with His Majesty. (Repealed by Statute Law Revision Act 1872 (35 & 36 Vict. c. 63))

=== Local acts ===
Short title	Citation	Royal assent
Long title
South Molton Roads Act 1801 (repealed)	42 Geo. 3. c. i	11 December 1801
An Act for continuing the Term and enlarging the Powers of Two Acts, passed in the Thirty-second Year of the Reign of His late Majesty King George the Second, (Note: South Molton Roads Act 1758 (32 Geo. 2. c. 45)) and the Nineteenth Year of the Reign of His present Majesty, (Note: South Molton Roads Act 1779 (19 Geo. 3. c. 81)) for repairing, widening, and rendering safe and commodious, several Roads leading from the Town of South Molton, in the County of Devon. (Repealed by Southmolton Roads (Devon) Act 1839 (2 & 3 Vict. c. xlix))
Tenbury Roads Act 1801 (repealed)	42 Geo. 3. c. ii	11 December 1801
An Act for continuing the Term, and altering and enlarging the Powers of Two Acts, passed in the Thirtieth Year of the Reign of His late Majesty King George the Second, (Note: Tenbury Roads Act 1757 (30 Geo. 2. c. 38)) and the Twenty-second Year of the Reign of His present Majesty, (Note: Tenbury Roads Act 1782 (22 Geo. 3. c. 103)) for amending, widening, and keeping in Repair several Roads in and near to the Town of Tenbury, in the Counties of Salop, Worcester, and Hereford, and also the Roads leading from the Knowle Gate to the Turnpike Road on the Clee Hill, leading from Ludlow to Cleobury Mortimer, and from Kyre to Tenbury, in the said Counties. (Repealed by Tenbury and Hereford Roads Act 1823 (4 Geo. 4. c. xxv))
Seend and Box Road (Wiltshire) Act 1801 (repealed)	42 Geo. 3. c. iii	15 December 1801
An Act for continuing the Term and Powers of an Act made in the Twentieth Year of the Reign of His present Majesty, intituled, "An Act for amending the Road from the West End of Seend Street to the Horse and Jockey, in the Parish of Box in the County of Wilts, and certain other Roads leading out of the said Road; and for making an additional Road from the said Road in the Chapelry of Seend, to communicate with the Devizes Turnpike Road, at or near Somerham Brook, in the same Chapelry, all in the said County." (Note: Wiltshire Roads (No. 2) Act 1780 (20 Geo. 3. c. 98)) (Repealed by Somerham Brook and Box (Wiltshire) Road Act 1823 (4 Geo. 4. c. xxix))

=== Private acts ===
Short title	Citation	Royal assent
Long title
East Tuddenham Inclosure Act 1801	42 Geo. 3. c. 1 Pr.	11 December 1801
An Act for dividing, allotting, and inclosing the Open Fields, Commons, and Waste Grounds, within the Parish of East Tuddenham, in the County of Norfolk.
Medlycott's Name Act 1801	42 Geo. 3. c. 2 Pr.	11 December 1801
An Act for enabling the Honourable Barbara Cockayne Medlycott to take and use the Surname and Arms of Medlycott, pursuant to the Will of her Grandfather, Thomas Medlycott Esquire, deceased.
Bluhm's Naturalization Act 1801	42 Geo. 3. c. 3 Pr.	11 December 1801
An Act for naturalizing John Henry Bluhm.
De Brouquens's Naturalization Act 1801	42 Geo. 3. c. 4 Pr.	11 December 1801
An Act for naturalizing John Bertrand de Boubeé de Brouquens.
Fridag's Naturalization Act 1801	42 Geo. 3. c. 5 Pr.	11 December 1801
An Act for naturalizing Sebastian Fridag.
Hilbers' Naturalization Act 1801	42 Geo. 3. c. 6 Pr.	11 December 1801
An Act for naturalizing Herman Gerhard Hilbers.
Lelievre's Naturalization Act 1801	42 Geo. 3. c. 7 Pr.	11 December 1801
An Act for naturalizing Pierre Joseph Amand Lelievre.
Aldebert and Becher's Naturalization Act 1801	42 Geo. 3. c. 8 Pr.	11 December 1801
An Act for naturalizing Isaac Aldebert and Charles Christian Becher.
Schroder's Naturalization Act 1801	42 Geo. 3. c. 9 Pr.	11 December 1801
An Act for naturalizing John Frederick Schroder.

=== Sources ===
- Raithby, John (1802). "42° Geo. III". The Statutes of the United Kingdom of Great Britain and Ireland. Vol. 1. Containing the Acts 41 Geo. III. (1801.) and 42 Geo. III. (1802.). London: Eyre and Strahan. pp. 277–791 – via Google Books.
- "42° George III.". The Statutes of the United Kingdom of Great Britain and Ireland. Vol. The First. From A.D. 1801, 41 George III.—To AD 1803, 43 George III. London: Eyre and Strahan. 1804. pp. 257–653 – via Google Books.
- "42° George III.". The Statutes of the United Kingdom of Great Britain and Ireland. Vol. The First. From A.D. 1801, 41 George III.—To AD 1803, 43 George III. London: Eyre and Strahan. 1804. pp. 257–653 – via HathiTrust.
- Journal of the House of Commons. Vol. 57. London: His Majesty's Stationery Office. pp. 3–663.
- Chronological Table of and Index to the Statutes. Vol. 1: To the End of the Session 59 Vict. Sess. 2 (1895) (13th ed.). London: Her Majesty's Stationery Office. 1896. pp. 171–174 – via Google Books.
- "Statutes of the United Kingdom of Great Britain and Ireland, 1802". Irish Statute Book. Office of the Attorney General, Government of Ireland.

== See also ==
- List of acts of the Parliament of the United Kingdom
