= Hector (disambiguation) =

Hector was a Trojan prince, champion of Troy and one of the greatest fighters of the Trojan War from Greek mythology.

Hector may also refer to:

== People ==
- Hector (given name), origin of the given name and list of people with the name
- Hector (surname), origin of the surname and list of people with the surname
- Hector (DJ) (born 1980), Mexican DJ and producer
- Hector (musician) (born 1947), Finnish musician
- Hector Ó hEochagáin (born 1969), Irish television presenter, commonly known as simply "Hector"

== Places ==
=== Antarctica ===
- Mount Hector (Antarctica)

=== Australia ===
- Hector, Queensland, a town in the Mackay Region, Australia

=== Canada ===
- Hector Glacier, Alberta
- Hector Lake, Alberta
- Mount Hector (Alberta)

=== New Zealand ===
- Hector, New Zealand, a settlement
- Hector River
- Mount Hector (New Zealand)

=== United States ===
- Hector, Arkansas, a town
- Hector, in San Bernardino County, California, where the rare clay mineral hectorite was found
- Hector, Kentucky, Clay County, Kentucky
- Hector, Minnesota, a city
- Hector, New York, a town
- Hector, Ohio
- Hector International Airport, North Dakota
- Hector Township, Potter County, Pennsylvania

== Dolphins ==
- Hector's dolphin, a cetacean endemic to New Zealand

== Arts, entertainment, and media ==
=== Films ===
- Hector (1987 film), a Flemish comedy film
- Hector (2015 film), a British drama film

=== Other arts, entertainment, and media ===
- Hector, the mascot for the heavy metal band HammerFall
- Hector, a Cherokee vigilante and, after his death, a symbol of "Hector Lives" justice for reservation residents in Longmire
- Hector: Badge of Carnage, a trilogy of computer games
- Hector, the eponymous dog in Hector's House

== Science and computing ==
- 624 Hektor, a Trojan asteroid
- Hector (API), a Java Cassandra client
- HECToR, 'a Research Councils UK High End Computing Service' - the UK's national academic supercomputer
- Hector (microcomputer)

== Meteorology ==
- Hector (cloud), a named cumulonimbus cloud that forms consistently over the Tiwi Islands, Australia

== Transportation and craft ==
=== Ships ===
- Hector (immigration ship), the vessel that carried the first Scottish immigrants to Nova Scotia in 1773
- Hector (1809 ship), a West Indiaman, captured and burnt 1814
- Hector (steamboat 1897), a fishing and tug boat
- Hector class ship of the line, a French Navy class
  - French ship Hector (1756), lead ship of the class
- Hector-class ironclad, a class consisting of a pair of Royal Navy armoured frigates built in the 1860s
  - HMS Hector (1862), lead ship of the class
- HMS Hector, eleven ships of the Royal Navy
- MV Hector, a diesel-powered tugboat
- USS Hector (AR-7), a repair ship that served with the United States Navy from 1944 to 1987

=== Other transportation and craft ===
- Hector, a steam locomotive of the South Devon Railway Eagle class
- Hawker Hector, British 1930s military aircraft
- MG Hector, a sport utility vehicle sold by SAIC Motor in India

== See also ==
- Hectors River, Jamaica
- Hektor (disambiguation)
- Hurricane Hector, a list of tropical cyclones in the Eastern Pacific Ocean
