= Clan MacEacharn =

Scottish family tree

Clan MacEacharn (Scottish Gaelic: Sìol Eachairn) were a group of families who occupied lands in the Kintyre, Islay, and Morvern regions of Scotland as well as island areas such as Mull and Tiree. They are traditionally known as one of the oldest Western Highland family names. The history of the Kintyre branch and its sub branches are well known, however the histories of the Islay and Morvern branches and the island branches is obscure.

== Origins of Clan MacEacharn ==
The MacEacharns are known as Sìol Eachairn. "The Seed of the Horse Lord". They are a clan with other clans branching from them. The clan has no septs, only branch families known under different clan names. The traditional seat of the MacEacharns was Killelan Estate in Southern Kintyre. Killelan translates as "the church of St Fillan". Saint Fillan's mother was Saint Kentigerna. Saint Kentigerna was a Leinster princess. Her father was King Cellach Cualann. Along with her brother Saint Comgan and her son Fillan she traveled to Scotland in the late 7th century AD.

The early 20th century scholar Rev. A.M. Sinclair noted that the genealogy of the MacEacherns was given in the Collectanea de Rebus Albanicis as "Andrew, son of Colin, son of Macrath, son of Gilchrist, son of Macrath, son of Marceartach, son of Cormac, son of Seth, son of Ferchar, son of Finlay, son of Nichol, son of Maine, son of Murdoch, son of Ectigern, who was called In Gamor". Sinclair speculated that the "In Gamor" may stand for an gainnear, meaning "the archer"; though also noted that it could also stand for an ceannair, meaning "the driver". Sinclair stated that Macrath, son of Ectigern had three sons—Gilchrist, Dugall, and Ranald. Gilchrist succeeded his father in Kintyre and was succeeded by his own son, Macrath, who was in turn succeeded by his son, Colin. Colin was in turn succeeded by his son, Andrew, who was chief of the clan in 1385. Sinclair also stated that Colin of Kilellan, a descendant of Andrew, was chief in the year 1493.

Sinclair disagreed with the claimed ancestry of the Clan Dugall Craignish and stated further that in the House of Argyll and the Collateral Branches of the Clan Campbell. , we are told that the MacCouls of Craignish are descended from Dugall Campbell, third son of Sir Archibald Gillespic Campbell. This statement is groundless, and contrary to known historic facts. MacCoul is a shortened form of Mac Dhughaill or MacDougall. MacCoul of Craignish means simply MacDougall of Craignish. There were two clan Dougalls in Scotland, the Clan MacDougalls of Lorn, who were descended from Dugall, son of Somerled of the Isles, and the Clan Dugall Craignish, who were descended from Dugall, son of Macrath, son of Ectigern. MacCoul is simply a contracted form of MacDougall. Both names are the same in Gaelic, Mac Dhughaill.

The clan is not registered with the Court of the Lord Lyon and as such is not officially recognised as a clan.

=== Siol Eachairn ===
Siol Eachairn was written by Rev. Dugald MacEchern in 1933. Siol Eachairn draws upon the original research published 30 years prior by Rev A. Maclean Sinclair. The document outlines the known theories on the origins of the people and the name; it then goes on to give a genealogical account of the three main branches of the family. These being the three sons of a man who is named Ectigern and who it appears died in the mid 12th century.

Ectigern, the progenitor of Siol Eachairn had three sons. These being Gilchrist (Gilles) the eldest, Dugal, and Ranald being the youngest.

- Gilchrist settled in South Kintyre and was seated at Kilellan Estate. Gilchrist is the first chief of Clan MacEacharn
- Dugal stayed in Lorne and was seated at Craignish. Dugal was the first Chief of Clan Dugall Craignish
- Ranald stayed in Lorne and his ancestors became known as Clan Malcolm or the MacCallums of Poltalloch

== Origins of the name MacEacharn ==
The name is known to have originated in Ireland as Ectigern, meaning Horse Lord. The name is mentioned nineteen times in either the Annals of the Four Masters, the Annals of Tigernach or the Annals of Ulster and is first mentioned in 760AD in the Annals of Ulster. The name is also written in Latin as MACHEACHYRNA as it is on the MacEacharn Cross at Kilkerran

Some of the many spellings of the name are MacEacharn; MacEachran; MacEchern; MacEachern, McEachern; MacEchron; McEchron; MacEachron; McEachron; McEathron; Macharn; MacEacharin; MacEachthighearna; MacEachairn. Names such as the Scottish Gaelic MacEachainn, and the Anglicised forms MacEachen, and MacEachin, are similar but not related names. Also reference Alexander MacBain, M.A., LL.D "Etymology of the Principal Gaelic national names, personal names, surnames : to which is added a disquisition on Ptolemy's Geography of Scotland"

The name is translated from Old Irish to mean in English Son of the Horse Lord. The original spelling of the name in Old Irish is Ectigern.

== Clans associated with Clan MacEacharn ==
In Morvern Clan MacEacharn was associated with Clan MacInnes, the MacMasters and the MacGillivrays in an alliance known as Siol Gillebride (The Seed of the Servant of Saint Bride) under the leadership of the Hebridean warrior Somerled, son of Gille Bride, son of Gille Adomnan. In the mid 14th century, the last chief of Clan MacInnes was killed, along with his sons, by order of John of Islay, Lord of the Isles. Some of the Clan MacInnes took refuge with the Clan Dugall Craignish, who by this time were known as Campbell of Craignish.

The Chief of Clan MacEacharn held a place on the Council of the Lords of the Isles as a freeholder. Freeholders were not descended paternally from Clan Donald.

The eighth Chief of Clan MacDougall Iain of Dunollie married Christina MacDougall daughter of the fourth chief of Clan Dugall Craignish. After twenty years they produced one son, Dougall, who became ninth chief of Clan MacDougall.

Alan MacCoul MacDougall of the MacCouls of Clan Dugall Craignish was the illegitimate kinsman of John MacDougall of Dunollie, 11th Chief of Clan MacDougall.This paternal association may indicate that Clan Dugall Craignish and Clan MacDougall are paternally related.
