= George Fiott Day =

Captain George Fiott Day VC CB
- Born: 20 June 1820; Southampton, Hampshire
- Died: 18 December 1876 (aged 56); Weston-super-Mare, Somerset
- Burial place: Weston-super-Mare Cemetery
- Military career
- Allegiance: United Kingdom
- Branch: Royal Navy
- Rank: Captain
- Conflicts: Second Egyptian–Ottoman War; Crimean War; Second Anglo-Chinese War; Second Anglo-Burmese War
- Awards: Victoria Cross; Companion of the Order of the Bath; Order of the Medjidieh (Ottoman Empire); Knight of the Legion of Honour (France)

Captain George Fiott Day, VC, CB (20 June 1820 – 18 December 1876) was a Royal Navy officer and one of the earliest recipients of the Victoria Cross, the highest award for gallantry in the face of the enemy that can be awarded to British and Commonwealth forces. He was also a Knight of the Legion of Honour.

== Naval career ==
George Fiott Day was born in Southampton. He joined the Royal Navy as a First Class Volunteer in 1833. His first vessel sailed to the Pacific Ocean and was wrecked off the coast of Patagonia in 1835. After serving off the west coast of Africa, in 1838 he departed for six and a half years service in the Mediterranean Sea, taking part in the bombardment of St. John d'Acre on the Syrian coast in 1840. From 1845 to 1848, he served in Africa, before departing for the Cape of Good Hope and the coast of Brazil. During the hostilities between the Argentine Confederation and Buenos Aires, he patrolled the Rivers of Paraguay and the Río de la Plata. In 1854, he was sent to the Baltic Sea, and then back to the Mediterranean Fleet, and eventually to the Black Sea in 1855, where he was awarded his Victoria Cross. He was 35 years old, and a lieutenant during the Crimean War:

On 17 September 1855 at Genitichi, Crimea, Lieutenant Day of HMS Recruit was put ashore from a rowing boat to reconnoitre the bridge, batteries and enemy gun boats on the Arabat Spit. He went alone and after covering four or five miles of swampy ground, sometimes up to his thighs in water, he got to within 200 yards of the enemy position, where he found that the gun boats appeared to be under-manned and lightly defended. He returned to his ship convinced that a surprise attack was possible, but had to abandon this plan when he returned on 19 September and found the enemy on the alert and the gun boats fully manned.

In 1857, Day was again off the west coast of Africa, and in late 1858 he sailed for the China Station. He was placed on the Captain's retired list in February 1867, owing to ill health. He retired with the rank of captain.

== Personal life ==
In 1858, Day married Mary Ruddell-Todd, the daughter of James Ruddell-Todd, and his wife Eliza Henrietta Campbell, daughter of Duncan Campbell, 5th of Inverneill House. His wife's maternal grandfather was a brother of Sir James Campbell of Inverneill and a nephew of General Sir Archibald Campbell. Mrs Day was a first cousin of Emily Georgina Carter-Campbell of Possil and Willoughby Harcourt Carter. The Days were the parents of three daughters. Captain Day died at Weston-super-Mare, where he is buried. His grave in Milton Road Cemetery, Weston super Mare was unmarked until 1982 when a memorial headstone was installed.
