= Hector (given name) =

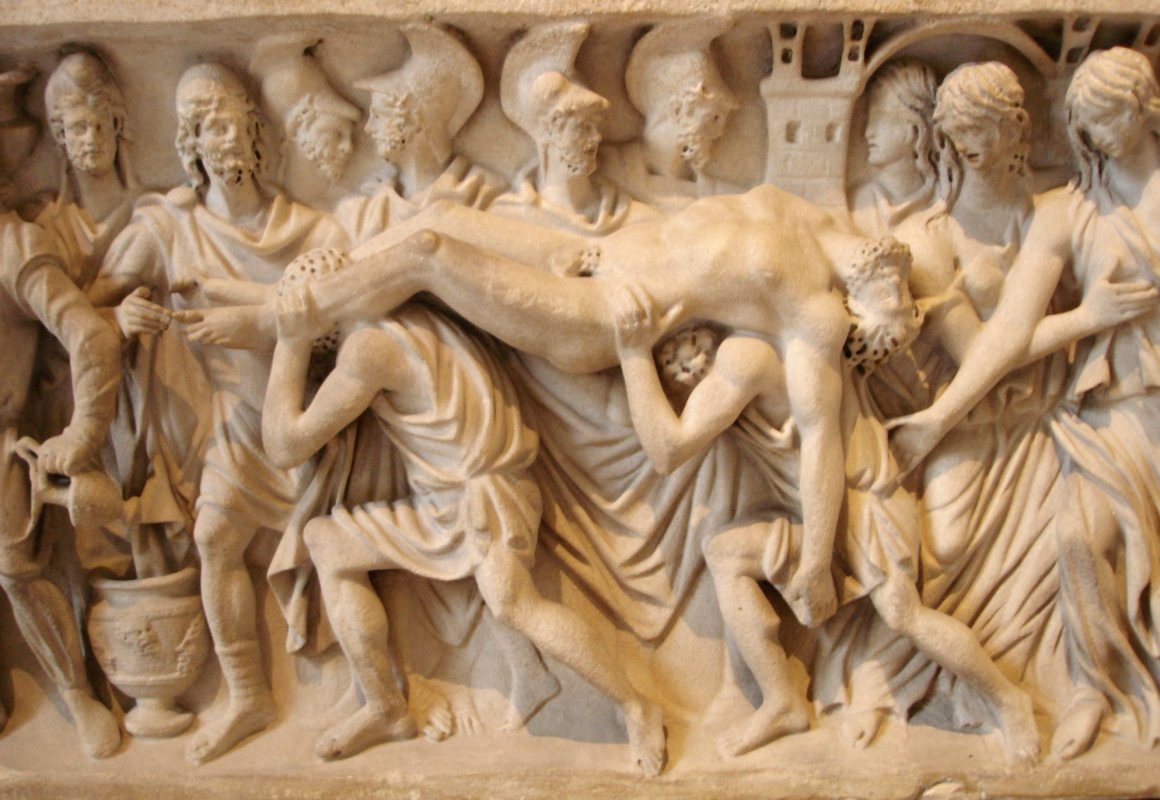
- Sculpture of Hektor being brought back to Troy, dating from c.180–200 CE.
- Gender: Masculine
- Language: Greek

Origin
- Meaning: "to have", "to hold", "to check", "restrain"
- Region of origin: Greece, England, France, Scotland, Spain

Other names
- Derived: Hektor
- Related names: Eachann, Heitor

Hector (/ˈhɛktər/) is an English, French, Scottish, and Spanish given name. The name is derived from the name of Hektor, a legendary Trojan champion who was killed by the Greek Achilles. The name Hektor is probably derived from the Greek ékhein, meaning "to have", "to hold", "to check", "restrain". In Scotland, the name Hector is sometimes an anglicised form of the Scottish Gaelic Eachann, and the pet form Heckie is sometimes used. The name of Sir Ector, the foster father of King Arthur, is also a variant of the same.

== Etymology ==
In Greek, Héktōr is a derivative of the verb ἔχειν ékhein, archaic form *ἕχειν, hékhein ('to have' or 'to hold'), from Proto-Indo-European *seɡ́ʰ- ('to hold'). Héktōr, or Éktōr as found in Aeolic poetry, is also an epithet of Zeus in his capacity as 'he who holds [everything together]'. Hector's name could thus be taken to mean 'holding fast'.

== Cognates ==
- Irish: Eachtar
- Italian: Ettore
- Portuguese: Heitor
- Greek: Modern Greek: Έκτορας (Ectoras), Ancient Greek: Ἕκτωρ (Hector)

== People with the name ==
- Hector of Provence (died 679), patrician of Marseille
- Hector (bishop of Le Puy) (fl. 928)
- Hector, bastard of Bourbon (died 1414)
- Hector Gottfried Masius (1653–1709), German Lutheran theologian
- Hector Abhayavardhana (1919–2012), Sri Lankan Sinhala Trotskyist politician
- Héctor Alterio (1929–2025), Argentine actor
- Hector Appuhamy, Sri Lankan politician
- Hector Arawwawala, Governor of North Western Province, Sri Lanka (1995–1999)
- Héctor Ávila, Dominican boxer
- Héctor Ballesteros, Colombian weightlifter
- Héctor Bellerín, Spanish football (soccer) player
- Hector Boece, a Scottish philosopher and historian
- Hector Berlioz, French composer
- Hector (Toe) Blake, Canadian hall of fame hockey player and coach
- Hector Luis Bustamante, Colombian actor
- Héctor Carrasco, Dominican baseball player
- Héctor Castaño, Colombian road cyclist
- Hector Charlesworth, Canadian writer, editor and critic
- Hector Crawford, Australian radio and television producer
- Hector de Zayas, U.S. Marine Corps officer and Navy Cross recipient
- Hector Deheragoda, Solicitor General of Sri Lanka from 1970 to 1972
- Héctor del Curto, Argentine tango bandoneon player
- Héctor Delgado, reggaeton artist
- Héctor Elizondo, Puerto Rican-American actor
- Héctor Ferri, Ecuadorian football (soccer) player
- Héctor Fresina, Argentine politician
- Hector Halsall, English rugby league footballer with Swinton RLFC in the 1920s
- Hector A. Hanson, American farmer and politician
- Hector Hetherington, Scottish philosopher
- Héctor King, Mexican recording artist
- Hector Kobbekaduwa, Sri Lankan Sinhala lawyer and politician
- Héctor Lavoe, Puerto Rican salsa singer
- Hector Lombard, Cuban-Australian mixed martial artist
- Hector Munro Macdonald, Scottish mathematician
- Hector Carsewell Macpherson, Scottish writer and journalist
- Héctor Moreno (footballer), Mexican football (soccer) player
- Hector Munro, 8th laird of Novar, a Scottish-born British soldier who became the ninth Commander-in-Chief, India
- Hector Hugh Munro, British writer who used the pseudonym Saki
- Héctor Noguera, Chilean television, film and theatre actor, and theatre director
- Héctor Ochoa Cárdenas, Colombian musician and composer
- Hector Ó hEochagáin, Irish radio and television presenter
- Héctor Germán Oesterheld, Argentine journalist and writer of graphic novels and comics
- Héctor Palacio, Colombian road racing cyclist
- Hector Rosales (born 1958), Uruguayan poet and writer
- Hector de Saint-Denys Garneau, Canadian poet
- Héctor Soto, Puerto Rican volleyball player
- Héctor Thomas, Venezuelan decathlete
- Héctor Timerman, Argentine foreign minister
- Hector Tyndale, American military officer
- Héctor Velásquez, Chilean boxer
- Héctor Vilches, Uruguayan football (soccer) player

== Arthurian legend ==
- Sir Ector
- Hector de Maris

== Fictional characters ==
- Hector (Ambrosia Mascot), parrot, unofficial mascot of games company Ambrosia Software
- Hector (Castlevania), from Castlevania: Curse of Darkness
- Hector (Fire Emblem), from the Fire Emblem video game franchise
- Hector (Marvel Comics), a Marvel Comics superhero
- Hector: Fat Arse of the Law, in the adventure video game Hector: Badge of Carnage
- Hector the Bulldog, in Looney Tunes cartoons
- Hector the Cat, a mascot for the teaching of road safety to children in Australia
- Hector Barbossa, in the Pirates of the Caribbean film series
- Hector Gonzales, in the film For Your Eyes Only
- Hector Hall, a DC Comics character
- Hector Hammond, a DC Comics supervillain.
- Hector Salamanca, a character in Breaking Bad and Better Call Saul
- Hector Con Carne, the main character from the American animated series Evil Con Carne

== See also ==
- Hector (disambiguation), other things named Hector on Wikipedia
- Orthodox Church celebrating Saint Hector
