= Willoughby Harcourt Carter =

First Chief Constable of Buckinghamshire (1822–1900)

1st Chief Constable of Buckinghamshire
- In office 1857–1867
- Succeeded by: Captain Tyrwhitt-Drake

Personal details
- Born: September 23, 1821 Bengal, India
- Died: 1900 (aged 77–78) Folkestone, Kent

Captain Willoughby Harcourt Carter (23 September 1821 – 18 October 1900) J.P. was the first appointed Chief Constable of Buckinghamshire, from 1857 to 1867.

== Background ==
Carter was born in Bengal, India, the only son of Joshua Carter (1793-1866), a judge with the Bengal Civil Service at Gorakhpur. His mother, Emily Agnes Campbell (1799–1889), was the eldest daughter of Duncan Campbell (1771–1840), 5th of Inverneill House. Carter's maternal grandfather was a brother of Sir James Campbell of Inverneill and a nephew of General Sir Archibald Campbell. He was a first cousin of Emily Georgina Carter-Campbell of Possil and Mrs George Fiott Day. Carter was brought up in Ireland by his grandfather, Willoughby Harcourt Carter (1767–1854), J.P., of Newpark, County Dublin, Attorney Exchequer of Dublin. They were named for their ancestor Willoughby Swift (1660-1715), the first cousin and benefactor of Jonathan Swift.

== Career ==
Carter was educated in England at Harrow School and the Royal Military College, Sandhurst. In 1839, he was appointed 2nd Lieutenant of the 64th (2nd Staffordshire) Regiment of Foot. By 1848, he was Captain of the 7th Royal Irish Fusiliers and before his retirement from the army he was Adjutant to the Lanarkshire Militia.

In Buckinghamshire, a ratepaying battle between the conservative and large liberal landowning families in 1856 and 1857 had erupted over the formation of Buckinghamshire's first police force. In consequence of the county dispute, in 1857, Robert Carrington, 2nd Baron Carrington, appointed Carter the first Chief Constable of Buckinghamshire as he was "free from party" and "a stranger to the county". Carter devoted much of his energy to breaking up the close administrative relationship between the existing police force and the individual magistrates operating in petty sessions divisions. The smaller landowning magistrates gathered in quarter sessions did not appreciate Carter's re-organanization. When Carter retired in 1867, they made sure that his successor, Captain Tyrwhitt-Drake, was a man firmly moulded by county connection and prestige. This move away from the last vestiges of "professional" police was a reaction to the declining powers of individual magistrates in police matters.

Carter retired from Buckinghamshire to 23 Clifton Terrace, Folkestone, Kent, where he served as a magistrate.

== Family ==
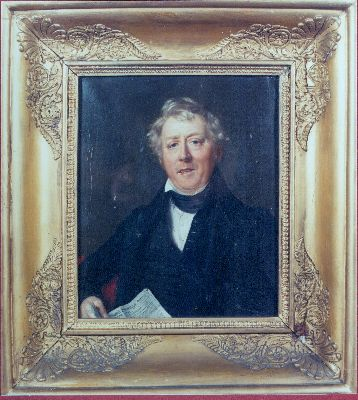
Carter's father-in-law, George Palmes of Naburn Hall, Yorkshire

In 1853, at Devonport, Devon, Carter married Eliza Palmes (1831–1903) of the Palmes family, daughter of George Palmes (1776–1851), J.P., D.L., of Naburn Hall, North Yorkshire. Carter lived his adult life in England, but owned just under 2,000 acres (8.1 km^{2}) at Annaghkeen, on Lough Corrib, County Galway, which his family had held since 1667. He also owned property on Grafton Street in Dublin, and a further 95 acres (380,000 m^{2}) in Queen's County, Ireland. He died at Elham, Kent, and was survived by his wife, three sons and two daughters. Their eldest daughter, Frances Edith Carter (1854-1950), married Lt.-Colonel Joseph Henry Banks. The Carters' youngest son, Brigadier General Charles Herbert Philip Carter (1864-1943), C.B.E., was dismissed from the British army and sent home for his part in the disastrous failure at the Battle of Fromelles.
