= Killellan House =

Country house in Argyll and Bute, Scotland

Coordinates: 55.3746°N 5.6557°W

Killellan House was a mansion house at Conie Glen, Kintyre, Scotland. Gutted by fire, the house was demolished in the 1960s, however the entrance lodge and gateway remain. The Killellan estate was held by the MacEacharn family from the 15th century, until controlled by the Earl of Argyll, with the estate coming back the MacEachan family in the late 17th century.

Archaeological evidence from the nearby Killellan Dun suggests the site was occupied by the MacEacherns around 1500, predating other documented records of their presence in the area.
