= Barrack Square (Square Field) =

Ground in West Bengal

Barrack Square or Square Field is a historical ground situated in the central of Berhampore, India in Murshidabad district. Barrack Square was established as the new cantonment of Suba Bengal on 1767 covering an area of about 40 acres. There are several old bungalows and barracks, presently used as Government offices.

== Historical significance ==
The British East India Company leased a total of 400 bighas land from the Nawab Mir Jafar in 1767 to establish a new cantonment. The cantonment was designed by Archibald Campbell and overseen by the architect Captain John Brohier where from the first major war of Indian Rebellion or Sepoy Mutiny of 1857 took place.
