= Cachia =

Cachia is a surname of disputed origin Scottish origin, coming from the kingdom of Dál Riata. It derives from the Gaelic form "MacEachainn". The surname "Cachia" can be traced to Knoydart. The surname has various variants, as a result of translation from Gaelic to English. The variants include McEachan, McGeachan, McKechnie, McGeachie. One of the first people from the Cachia family to emigrate to the United States was Thomas McKeachie in 1797.

People with this surname include:

- Naomi Cachia (born 1993 or 1994), Maltese politician
- Jaryd Cachia (born 1991), Australian rules footballer
- Jamie Cachia (born 1987), Scottish field hockey goalkeeper
- Therese Comodini Cachia(born 1973), Maltese lawyer and politician
- Alfredo Cachia Zammit (1890–1960), Maltese politician and philanthropist
- Michele Cachia (1760–1839), Maltese architect and military engineer
- Antonio Cachia (1739–1813), Maltese architect, engineer and archaeologist
- Domenico Cachia (c. 1690–1761), Maltese capomastro
