= Joseph Banks (disambiguation) =

Sir Joseph Banks (1743–1820) was a British naturalist and botanist.

Joseph or Joe Banks may also refer to:

- Joseph Banks (Grimsby MP) (1665–1727), Member of Parliament (MP) for Grimsby, 1715 and Totnes, 1722
- Joseph Banks (MP for Peterborough) (1695–1741), MP for Peterborough, 1728
- Joseph Henry Banks (1843–1916), British soldier
- Joseph Banks Rhine (1895–1980), American botanist and parapsychologist
- Joe Banks, member of the punk band Avail
- Joe Banks, hero of the film Joe Versus the Volcano

== See also ==
- JoS. A. Bank Clothiers, a men's clothing company
- Banks (surname)
- Joseph Danks
