= Craignish Castle =

Coordinates: 56°9′18″N 5°35′23″W

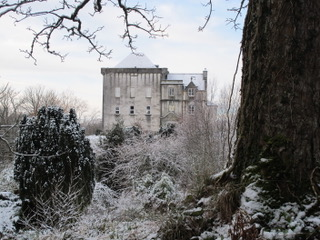
- The castle in 2009
- Interactive map of Craignish Castle

General information
- Location: Scotland

Craignish Castle is located on the Craignish peninsula in Argyll, western Scotland and is a category B listed building. The present castle includes a 16th-century tower house, the seat of the Campbell family of Craignish and Jura. In the 19th century, it was sold to the Trench-Gascoigne family of Parlington Hall, Yorkshire, who built a large extension to the tower. In the later 20th century, the house was restored and parts of the 19th-century extension were demolished. It has previously been known as Loch Beag.

== History ==
The Campbells of Craignish claim to descend from Dugal Maul Campbell, the first Laird of Craignish (1156–1190), who was the second son of Sir Archibald Gillespic Campbell, the ancestor of the Dukes of Argyll. The seventh laird left only one daughter, Christine Campbell (b. 1323). Subsequently, the majority of the estate was resigned to the Knight of Lochow. As a result, she was left with only a small portion of the upper part of Craignish. The nearest male representative, Ronald Campbell, then attempted to regain the estate. The then Chief of Clan Campbell was obliged to allow him possession of a considerable portion of the estate, but retaining the superiority, and inserting a condition in the grant that if there was ever no male heir in the direct line the lands were to revert automatically to the Argyll family.

The present castle was built in the 16th century as a tower house, and measures 12.7 by 10.2 metres (42 by 33 ft). It is said to have withstood a siege of six weeks by Colkitto MacDonald. In 1510, Ranald MacCallum was made hereditary keeper of Craignish Castle.

In 1544, the direct line ended, and the heir, a collateral relative by the name of Charles Campbell of Corranmore in Craignish, killed the Gillies of Glenmore in a brawl. This forced him to flee to Perthshire where he settled at Lochtayside under the protection of the Breadalbane family. From this incident, Charles was prevented from claiming the estate and as a result, the castle fell into the hands of the Earls (later Dukes) of Argyll.

Charles' descendants at Killin, Perthshire, were later recognised by the Lord Lyon as Chieftains of the Clan Tearlach branch of Clan Campbell and from them descended the Campbells of Inverneill. In the 1980s, a grandson of Duncan Campbell, 8th of Inverneill, owned one of the apartments at Craignish Castle.

The title 'Baron of Craignish' was created for Edmund Kempt Campbell by the Duke of Saxe-Coburg-Gotha in 1848, and was used by his descendants in Britain, though this was after the sale of Craignish.

In the 19th-century, Craignish Castle was purchased by Frederick Trench-Gascoigne and his wife Isabella, heiress of the Gascoigne family of Parlington Hall. By the 1880s, Trench-Gascoigne owned 5,591 acres (2,263 ha) in Argyll. In 1837, the tower house was extended by the architect David Bryce, working to designs by William Burn. The Gascoigne’s commissioned Alexander Ritchie to build the Celtic Room. The room itself is made with inlaid carved oak, created from rubbings that Ritchie took from the tombs of the Kings of Scotland buried on Iona. The room was completed in 1907.

The castle also has a bottle dungeon, cut out of rock under the kitchen floor, and is one of the few remaining in Scotland today. There is also the original Yett on the side door, with a right-handed spiral staircase.

In 1941, the house was requisitioned for use as a home for children evacuated, from Glasgow, during the second world war. In the later 20th century, it was restored and divided into privately owned apartments.

== Gallery ==
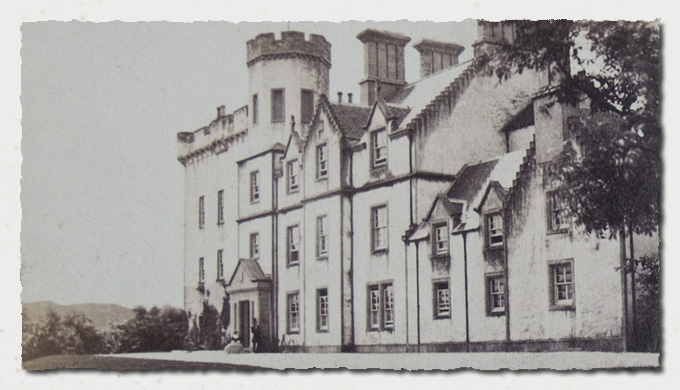
19th-century photo of Craignish, showing the tower house (on the left) with the later additions

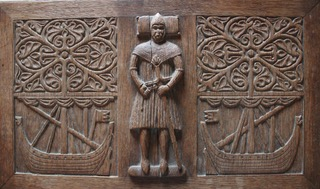
Alexander Ritchie inlaid carved in oak taken from tomb rubbings of the Kings of Scotland

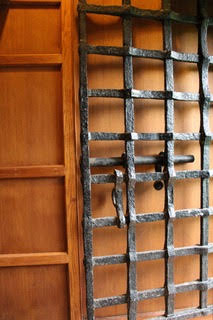
Bottle dungeon gates at Craignish

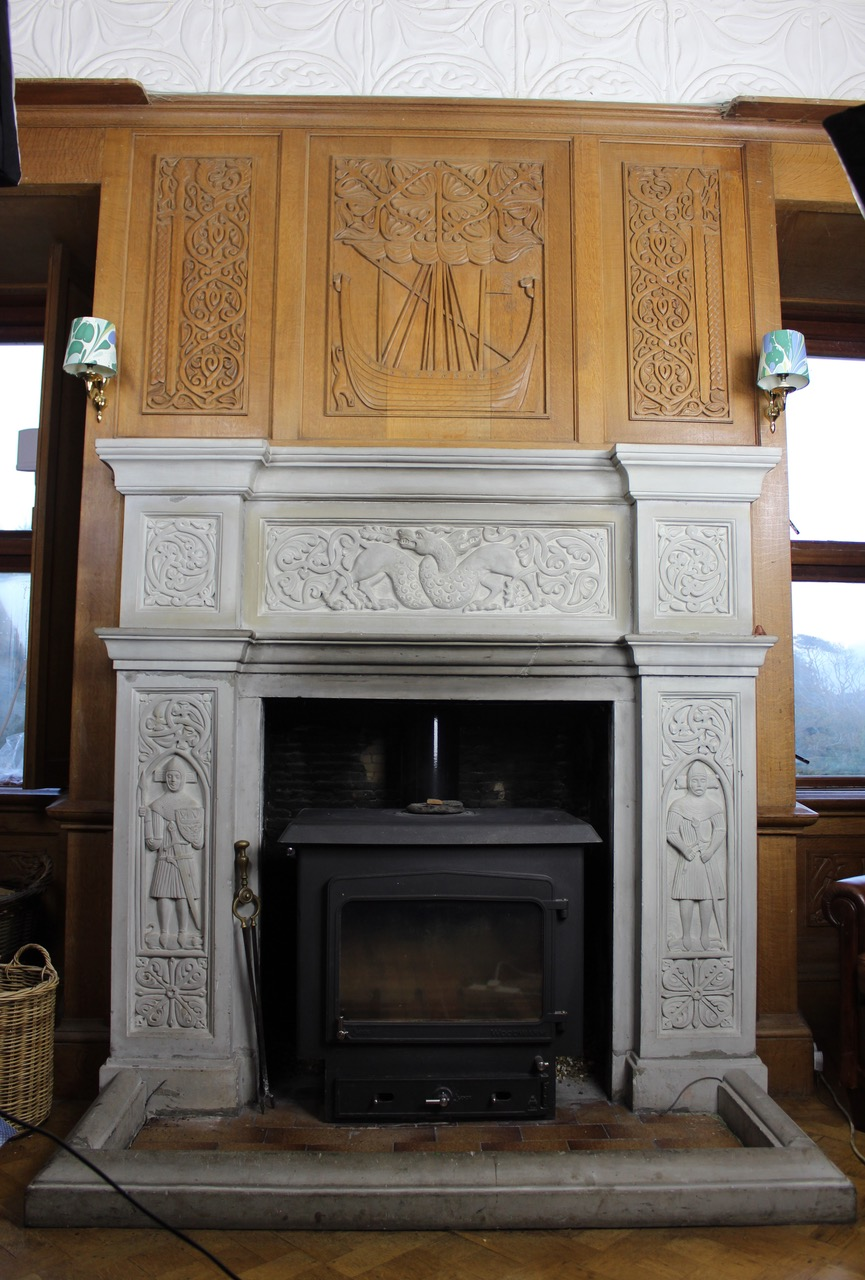
Craignish Castle
