= Jane Addison =

1st woman to successfully divorce in England (1771-1851)

- Born: Jane Campbell; 1771; Inverneil, United Kingdom
- Died: 27 February 1851 (aged 79–80); England, United Kingdom
- Other names: Jane Pocklington
- Known for: Being the first woman to successfully petition for a full divorce in England against her husband
- Spouses: Edward Addison (m. 1788; div. 1801) Roger Pocklington (m. 1802)
- Children: 5
- Parent(s): Sir James Campbell; Jean, Lady Campbell
- Relatives: Sir Archibald Campbell (uncle) Sir James Campbell, Bt. (brother) Duncan Pocklington (grandson)

Jane Addison (née Campbell, later Pocklington; 1771 – 27 February 1851) was the first woman in the United Kingdom to petition a divorce (with the ability to remarry) against her husband through an act of Parliament and did so with success. The divorce was on the grounds of her husband's incestuous adultery and was granted in 1801. Only four other women won full divorce petitions against their husbands before 1857. Prior to 1857, there were only 329 divorces granted in the United Kingdom.

== Biography ==
Jane Addison was born in 1771 as Jane Campbell to Sir James Campbell (1737–1805) and Jean, Lady Campbell. The family belongs to the Inverneil branch of the Clan Campbell and could trace their heritage to the back to the 16th century. Her father was a Member of Parliament who occupied the seat in 1776 in place of his brother Sir Archibald Campbell who was abroad fighting in the American Revolutionary War. Prior to this, Sir James had also seen military service in America. The childless Sir Archibald had purchased the hereditary title of Usher of the White Rod for Scotland in 1790 and Sir James later inherited the office in 1791 by which time Jane Campbell, was married to London merchant Edward Addison; and her full sister, Jessie Campbell, was married to Calcutta Surgeon Dr James Campbell. Jane had married Edward on 29 April 1788. They had a son and daughter. Sir James Campbell, Bt. (named after their father) was Jane's brother. Such strong political connections allowed her to get a full divorce.

Jessie Campbell returned to England from India in 1791 after which Jessie had an affair with her brother-in-law Mr. Addison. The affair was deemed to be incest as marriages between a man and his deceased wife's sister was voidable (later made illegal). Dr. Campbell had learnt about the affair first and initiated divorce proceedings while Mrs. Addison learnt of the affair from her other sister Mrs. Elizabeth Cassmajor and her husband Mr. James Cassmajor. Jane left England to return to live with her father in Scotland.

Mrs. Addison attained a legal separation from a religious court on the basis of adultery with success and wanted a divorce. The Parliament was keen to note whether or not Jane was aware of her husband's incestuous adultery which Mr. Cassmajor testified against. Testimonies from various individuals including waiters and servants indicated that Mr. Addison and Mrs. Jessie Campbell were indeed having an affair beyond doubt. There were initial calls that Mrs. Addison's petition was invalid as she was a woman, however, the fact that the adultery involved incest allowed the petition to remain valid.

The Campbell's Divorce Act 1801 (41 Geo. 3. (U.K.) c. 102 Pr.) stipulated that Mr. Addison and Mrs. Jessie Campbell were forever barred from marrying each other and that Mrs. Jessie Campbell was barred from marrying anyone during the lifetime of Dr. Campbell who also received criminal conversation of £5,000 (approximately £371,332 in 2019) from Mr. Addison. Mrs. Addison was free to remarry and also attained custody of her children as her husband was deemed unfit to take care of their education. This was extremely unusual at the time as custody almost always went to the father (unless the child was deemed illegitimate in which case custody went to the mother).

Later, Jane went on to remarry the wealthy Nottingham architect Roger Pocklington, Sr. on 2 February 1802 and had a son, Roger Pocklington, Jr in November 1802. However, Mr. and Mrs. Roger Pocklington began to experience financial issues leading to Mrs. Pocklington and her children's move to Leamington. Mr. Addison left the United Kingdom for Hamburg to avoid payment of criminal conversation.

She died on 27 February 1851 (aged 80) and was buried besides her husband Roger Pocklington at All Saints' Church, Winthorpe. Her grandson was the first-class cricketer Duncan Pocklington.

Despite the case, women rarely acquired custody of their children after a separation or divorce until the Caroline Norton-influenced Custody of Infants Act 1839 (2 & 3 Vict. c. 54) and the Jane Addison case was publicly declared by officials as an exception. Divorce became easier to acquire after 1857.

== See also ==
- Custody of Infants Act 1839
- Matrimonial Causes Act 1857
