= Tector =

Tector may refer to:

== Fiction ==
- Tector Gorch, a character in the 1969 film The Wild Bunch
- Tector Crites, a character in the 1972 film The Life and Times of Judge Roy Bean
- Tector Pike, a character in the 1989 film Blind Fury
- Tector Gorch, a minor Buffy the Vampire Slayer villain
- Tector, a character in the 2003 film Small Town Conspiracy
- Tector Murphy, a supporting character in the 2011 TV series Falling Skies

== People ==
- Chris Tector, a person associated with Turn 10 Studios
- Jack Tector, an Irish cricketer with the Ireland national under-19 cricket team
- J.L. Tector, a hurler; see Wexford Senior Hurling Championship
- Jos Tector, a player of American football with the Cornish Sharks
- Konrad Lundqvist Petterson Tector (1838–1876), a Swedish criminal, one of the last public executions in Sweden
- William R. Tector, a former principal of Sandford Park School

== Other uses ==
- Iveco Tector, an engine manufactured by Iveco
- Tector-class, a variant form of Star Destroyer

== See also ==
- Hector (disambiguation)
