= Hektor (disambiguation) =

Hektor is a Trojan prince in Greek mythology.

Hektor may also refer to:

- 624 Hektor, the largest of the Jovian Trojan asteroids
- Hektor (lens), a photographic lens design
- HECToR, Cray supercomputer located in Britain
- Hektor Martin, fictional character
- Hektor Giotopoulos Moore (born 2002), Austrian pair skater

== See also ==
- Hector (disambiguation)
