= Dunan Aula =

Cist in Argyll and Bute, Scotland

Coordinates: 56.2059°N 5.4934°W

Location of Dunan Aula.

Dunan Aula, also known in Scottish Gaelic as Dùnan Amhlaidh, is the site of an exposed cist, located in the parish of Craignish, in Argyll and Bute, Scotland, at grid reference NM83420697. The place-name means "Olaf's mound"; it is said to commemorate a Viking prince so-named, who fell in battle against the native Scots.

== Location ==
Dunan Aula is situated 650 metres (2,130 ft) north-northeast of Barbreck House in Craignish parish. The cist is located on the top of a large mound, north of an 18th-century burial ground and mausoleum.

== Description ==
The cist is said to have been found sometime before the late 18th century. The 1791–99 Statistical Account of Scotland records that when it was discovered it had been covered in loose stones.

The cist consists of large slabs of stone and a gabled capstone. It is aligned northeast and southwest. The cist measures 4 feet (1.2 m) by 2.7 feet (0.82 m) by 2.9 feet (0.88 m); the gabled capstone measures 5.4 feet (1.6 m) by 4.8 feet (1.5 m). Other stones which project from the mound may suggest that there are other graves in the area. There is no trace of any cairn material.

There is also an upright slab located roughly 9.5 metres (31 ft) to the north-northwest, on the side of the knoll. It is aligned northwest and southeast. It measures 0.6 metres (2 ft 0 in) by 0.4 metres (1 ft 4 in) at the base; and is 1 metre (3 ft 3 in) high. The slab has straight slides and a flat top. It is not considered to be part of the cist.

== Archaeological finds ==
A history of the parish of Craignish appears in the 1791–99 Statistical Account of Scotland, written by Rev. Lachlan M'Lachlan, parish minister. Within his account, M'Lachlan noted that "not many years before" some workmen uncovered the cist after removing some loose stones on the mound. Within the cist an urn was found; which was then broken and destroyed in an attempt to get at its supposed "treasure". M'Lachlan noted to the great disappointment to those who destroyed it, all the urn contained was ash.

== Local legend ==
M'Lachlan, in his late 18th century historical account of the parish, stated that according to local tradition, Dunan Aula was near the site of a great battle between "Danes" [Vikings] and the natives of the area. The tradition was that Olaus, son of the "King of Denmark", was slain in the battle; and that the mound of Dunan Aula, "the little Mount of Olaus", was named after him.

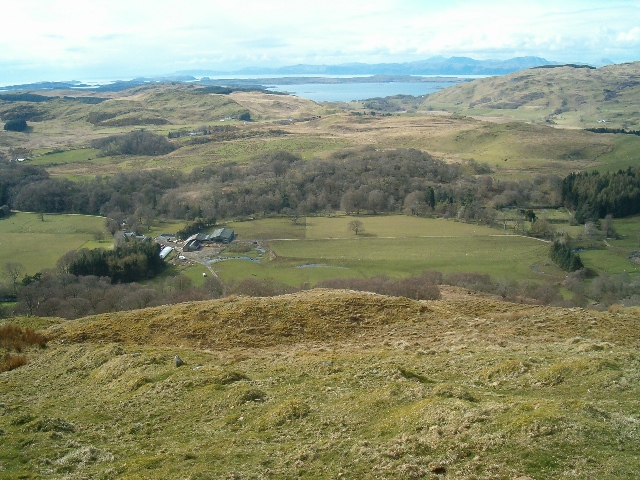
Druim Righ. Barbreck House and farm is visible on the left.

Rev. Archibald Francis Stewart wrote the account of the parish in the 1834–45 Statistical Account of Scotland. Stewart wrote an expanded form of the tradition mentioned by M'Lachlan. Stewart wrote that it was said that a great battle took place in the parish; fought between the "Danes" [Vikings] under Olave, or Olaus, son of their monarch, and the natives under their king. The battle was said to have begun at Druim Righ ("the king's ridge"). In the first encounter, the natives gave way and retreated up the valley. However, once they retrieved reinforcements they rallied at a place called Sluggan, and managed to successfully repel the foreigners. One of the "Danish" leaders, Ulric, was slain and a grey stone was said to still mark the spot where he fell. The "Danes" then recovered themselves and stood their ground where the battle first commenced. Olave and the Scottish king were said to have fought in single combat, in which Olave was slain. His body was then interred in the tumulus, known ever since as Dunan Aula, located about a quarter of a mile from Druim Righ where he fell. Stewart stated that there were other monuments in the area which tradition stated were erected for those who fell at this battle. He wrote that some of these still stood at his time of writing, although one large grey stone, and a circle of smaller stones was removed when the modern Barbreck House of constructed.

A brief, but similar version was published in the late 19th century, within a collection of Argyllshire traditions titled Waifs and Strays of Celtic Tradition. This version states that a force of Norwegians landed in the area and the locals fled to the upper end of the district, up to the Slugan (gorge) of Glean Domhnuinn (the Deep Glen). The locals were, however, rallied by a young man who slew the Norwegian leader, with either a spear or an arrow. The invaders then lost heart, and were pushed back past the Barbeck river. The invaders afterwards buried their leader on Barbreck farm, which bears the name Dùnan-Amhlaidh, or Olav's Mound. The locals of the district also raised a stone at the spot where Olav fell. In the early 20th century, Patrick H. Gillies wrote of the same tradition; although in his version Olaf was himself a king who died fighting the King of Scots.
