= Duncan Pocklington =

English cricketer and Anglican clergyman

Personal information
- Full name: Duncan Pocklington
- Born: 18 June 1841; Walesby, Nottinghamshire, England
- Died: 1 June 1870 (aged 28); Pimlico, London, England
- Batting: Unknown

Career statistics
Competition	First-class
Matches	1
Runs scored	27
Batting average	27.00
100s/50s	–/–
Top score	24*
Balls bowled	166
Wickets	2
Bowling average	30.00
5 wickets in innings	–
10 wickets in match	–
Best bowling	2/44
Catches/stumpings	–/–
- Source: Cricinfo, 21 November 2019

Duncan Pocklington (18 June 1841 – 1 June 1870) was an English first-class cricketer and Anglican clergyman.

The son of Roger Pocklington, he was born in June 1841 at Walesby, Nottinghamshire. He was educated at Eton College, before going up to Brasenose College, Oxford. While at Oxford, was a member of the Oxford University Boat Club and was a member of the winning Oxford crew in the 1864 Boat Race. Although Pocklington did not feature in first-class cricket for Oxford University Cricket Club, he did play for the Gentlemen of the North against the Gentlemen of the South at Nottingham in 1862, where he scored 27 runs and took 2 wickets in the match. After graduating from Oxford, Pocklington took holy orders, becoming the curate of Tithby in Nottinghamshire until his death in June 1870 at Pimlico. His grandmother was Jane Addison, who was the first woman in the United Kingdom to petition a divorce (with the ability to remarry) against her husband through an Act of Parliament and to do so with success.
