= Hector (surname) =

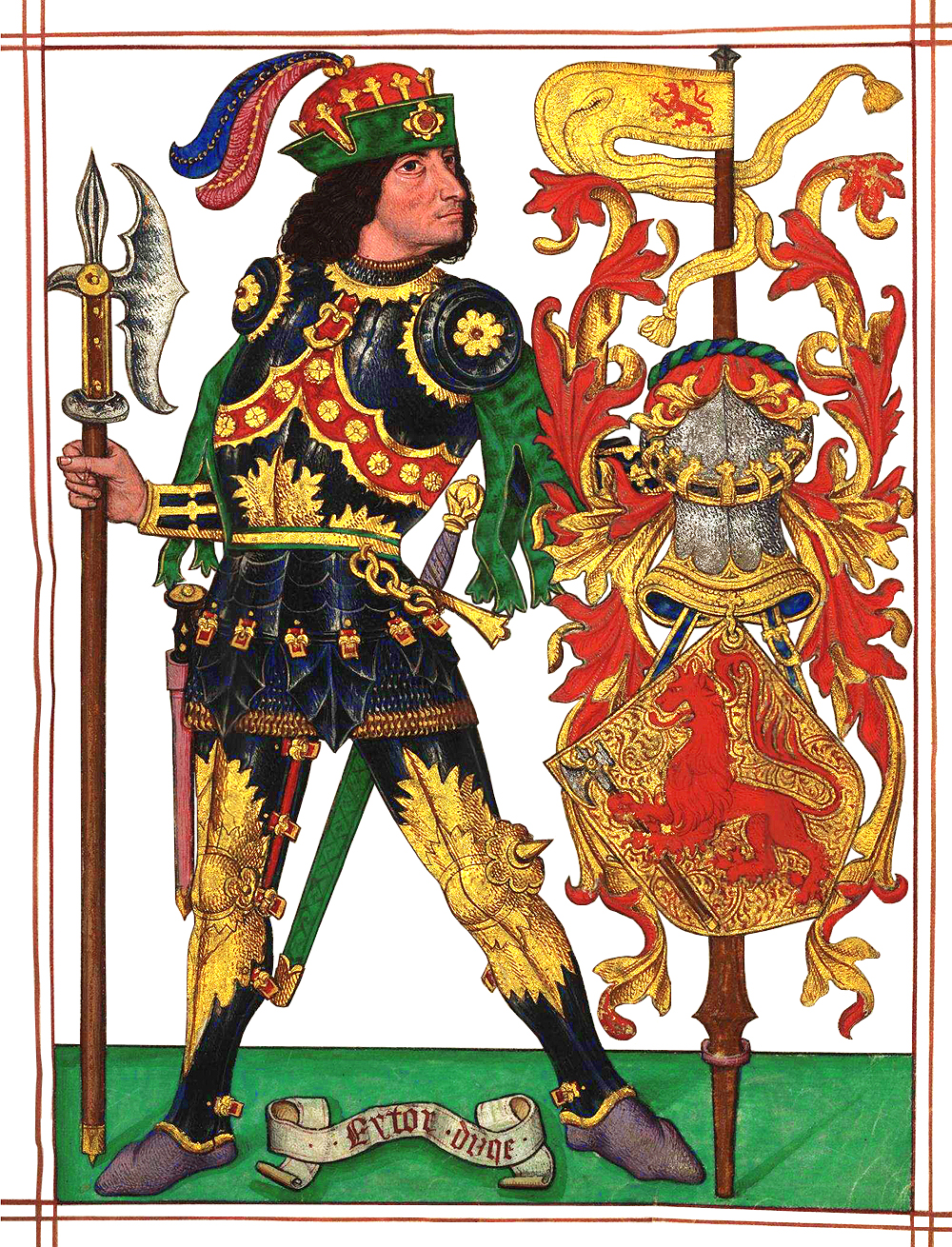
- The mythical Trojan prince Hector, influenced the popularity of this surname across languages during the medieval period.
- Language: English, Dutch, French and German

Origin
- Meaning: "hold in check"
- Region of origin: England, France, Germany, Netherlands

Other names
- Variant forms: Eachann; Hector (given name); Hekter

The surname Hector is an English, Dutch, French and German surname.

== Origin of the surname ==
The English surname is derived from a Gaelic personal name Eachdonn, composed of the elements each (horse) and donn (brown). This name was assimilated with Hector, the name of the Trojan king's eldest son. The Classical Greek Hekter is probably derived from the Greek ekhein, meaning "hold in check".

The Dutch, French, and German surnames are also derived from the Greek name. Hector is rarely found as a French surname. In medieval Germany, the personal name was quite popular among the noble class.

== Notable people ==
- Auckland Hector (1945–2017), Kittitian cricketer
- Benjamin Hector (born 1979), South African cricketer
- Bruce Hector (born 1994), American football player
- James Hector (1834–1907), Scottish geologist, naturalist, and surgeon
- Jamie Hector (born 1975), American actor of Haitian descent
- Jonas Hector (born 1990), German footballer
- Kate Hector (born 1981), South African hockey player
- Kevin Hector (born 1944), English footballer who played for Bradford Park Avenue and Derby County
- Louis Hector (1883–1968), American actor
- Sara Hector (born 1992), Swedish alpine skier
- Willie Hector (born 1939), American football player
- Veronica Dorsette-Hector, Montserratian politician
