= MacEachen =

MacEachen, McEachen
- Language: Scottish Gaelic

Origin
- Meaning: son of Eachann
- Region of origin: Scotland

Other names
- Variant forms: Eachann; MacEachainn; MacEachin; McEachin

The surnames MacEachen, McEachen, MacEachin, and McEachin are Anglicised forms of the Scottish Gaelic MacEachainn, which means "son of Eachann". The Scottish Gaelic given name Eachann is composed of two elements. The first element is each, meaning "horse". The second element is donn, which has been given two different meanings. One proposed meaning is "brown"; the other is "lord".

== MacEachen ==
- Allan MacEachen (1921–2017), Canadian politician
- Emilio MacEachen (born 1992), Uruguayan footballer

== McEachin ==
- Donald McEachin (1961–2022), German-born American politician
- Herb McEachin (born 1954), American-Australian basketball player
- James McEachin (1930–2025), American actor and author
- Neil McEachin (1900–1957), American politician and judge

== See also ==
- MacEachern (surname)
