= Hector Rosales =

Uruguayan poet and writer (born 1958)

Hector Rosales (born April, 1958 in Montevideo) is an Uruguayan poet and writer.

== Biography ==
As a child, he lived in the Aires Puros of Montevideo. He attended a local elementary school before moving up to the Mother Ana Lyceum, and then the Dr. Eduardo Acevedo Institute in Montevideo, getting a bachelor's degree in Law.

The 1973 Uruguayan coup d'état influenced his first short stories and poems, which were circulated among friends and relatives; he later said these first writings had little aesthetic value and were written only as an outlet for his adolescent despair.

== Career ==
Between 1977 and 1978, Rosales wrote his first two books of poetry, Visions and Agonies and Night Mirrors. In January 1979, he made the decision to leave the turmoil of Montevideo behind him, and move to Ruby, Spain., near Barcelona. He became a Spanish national in 1980 and continued to stay busy with various writing and media projects. He wrote numerous journal articles, collaborated on literary works with other writers, established the poets group known as “Group Now,” was involved in publishing, organized discussions, workshops, recitals, worked in graphic design, radio, and immersed himself in studying the works of Spanish poets. In 1992, he moved to Barcelona and from 1993 to 1995 he ran a language school there. From November 1994 to September 1996, he edited the folios for The Leaves of the Flood, an anthology of Latin American and Spanish poets.

From 2000 to 2006, he was a member of the governing body of the English Library. He currently manages a group of schools in the Catalan capital of Barcelona.

The works of Hector Rosales have been translated into English, Italian, German, Polish, Catalan and Galician. Rosales continues to write in his leisure time, away from the public and media spotlight. He also continues to promote the works of his fellow Uruguayan writers as well as continuing on with his travels, which he says are in a constant battle with his “unique and disproportionate enemy:time.”

== Works ==
Poetry

- Visions and agonies (Barcelona, 1979, 2nd ed. revised and expanded, New Jersey, 2000)
- Mirrors at night (Madrid, 1981)
- Folder 1 (Barcelona, 1982)
- Dende eigui / booklet (Pontevedra, 1983)
- Spectra (Gijon, 1983)
- Desvuelo (1st ed. Montevideo, Barcelona, 1984, 2nd ed. Revised and expanded: Barcelona, 1997, 3rd ed. 1999, 4th ed.-book, San Jose, Costa Rica, 2001, 5th ed. Pdf, Mexico 2004)
- Four texts / fold (Barcelona, 1985)
- Five poems (in supplement magazine “Calandrajas” No. 15, Toledo, 1987)
- Rails / booklet (Barcelona, 1989)
- Around the siege (Montevideo, three eds., 1989/92/93, first prize in 1992, the Ministry of Education and Culture, Uruguay)
- Four postal Sweden / fold ( four eds., 1992/93/94 Barcelona, Mexico, ed. Pdf, 2005)
- Inhabitants cry incomplete (Montevideo, 1992)
- The inverted spring / booklet (five eds., 1994/96/2003 Barcelona, the latter increased, and Santiago de Compostela, 1995, with Galician version integrating Olisbos University Magazine, No. 17)
- While rain does not erase the traces (Barcelona, 2002)

Anthologies

- Voices in stone lit / Ten Uruguayan poet (Toledo, 1988)
- Chappies, the spines of the verse (Montevideo, 2001)
