= Campbell of Craignish =

Coat of arms of Campbell of Craignish

The Campbells of Craignish (Mac Dúbhghaill Creaginnis in the Scottish Gaelic or Gàidhlig) form one of the oldest branches of the ancient and powerful Clan Campbell in Scotland. They claim descent from Dugald Campbell, the second son of Sir Archibald Gillespic Campbell (b.1130), 5th Knight of Lochawe and 20th Chief of Clan Campbell at the time. Sir Archibald's first son, Sir Duncan Campbell, 6th Knight of Lochawe, was the founder of the principal branch of the Campbell family who today holds the title Duke of Argyll.

The family - the eldest cadets of the house of Argyll - was a virile race, its members in all generations, to their cost, little disposed to diplomacy or guile, but staunch defenders of their rights and good soldiers By alliances through marriage and conquest they quickly acquired large possessions, and their growing power was noticed with apprehension and jealousy by the parent house of Lochow. The family no longer owns the Lairdship of Craignish (see below). The coat of arms of Dugall Campbell of Craignish (below) is described in Nisbet's "A System of Heraldry" as 'gyronny of eight or and sable, the shield hanging from the mast of a lymphad sable'. The coat of arms left is the suggested arms of the current incumbent - the Ducal Crown is awarded because the holder is a Clan Chieftain, but it is tinctured blue because the original estates are no longer in possession of the Chieftain. The Chief of the Clan is also Chief of Clan MacInnes, and Chief of the Name MacIsaac, MacKissock and MacKessack.

== Craignish Castle ==
The founder of the Campbells of Craignish, Dugall Maul Campbell became first Laird of Craignish and his descendants built and resided in Craignish Castle, on the Craignish peninsula in Argyll.. Ranald MacCallum was made hereditary keeper of Craignish Castle in 1510. However, the castle has long since escaped family hands, and in 1832 was rebuilt as a private mansion for Mr. Trench-Gascoigne, who owned nearly 6000 acres (24 km^{2}) in Argyllshire. Today, the Castle has been converted into apartments and is owned privately.

== Lairds of Craignish ==
- Sir Archibald Campbell, 5th Knight of Lochawe, 20th Chieftain of Argyll
- Dugald Maul Campbell (1156–1190), second son of above, 1st Laird and Chieftain of Campbell of Craignish
- Dugald Campbell, 2nd Laird (1178–1220), 2nd Chieftain
- Dugald Campbell, 3rd Laird (1200–1250), 3rd Chieftain
- Dugald Campbell, 4th Laird (1225–1250), 4th Chieftain
- Dugald Campbell, 5th Laird (d.1270), 5th Chieftain
- Malcolm Campbell, 5th Laird (1250–1290), 5th Chieftain
- Sir Dugald Campbell, 6th Laird (1272-????), 6th Chieftain
- Sir Dugald Campbell, 7th Laird (1300–1350), 7th Chieftain
- Christina Campbell (b.1323), 8th Chieftain

The 7th Laird had left only one daughter, Christine Campbell (b. 1323). Her weakness and imprudence caused the majority of the estate to be resigned to the Knight of Lochawe, who took advantage of her. She was left with only a small portion of the upper part of Craignish under his superiority. The nearest male representative - Ronald Campbell - was a nephew of her grandfather, and he fought hard to win back his heritage. The then Chief of Clan Campbell was obliged to allow him possession of a considerable portion of the estate, but retaining the superiority, and inserting a condition in the grant that if there was ever no male heir in the direct line the lands were to revert automatically to the Argyll family.

- Ronald Campbell of Corranmore, nephew of the 6th Laird, became the 8th Laird and 9th Chieftain
- John 'Ean Gorm' Campbell, 9th Laird, 10th Chieftain
- Donald McEan Gorm Campbell, second son of the 9th Laird, became the 10th Laird, 11th Chieftain & 1st Baron Campbell of Barrichebean
- Dugald Campbell, eldest son of Archibald, eldest son of the 9th Laird, became 11th Laird and 12th Chieftain
- Ronald Campbell, natural son of the above, became 12th Laird and 13th Chieftain
- Dugald Oig Campbell, 13th Laird, 14th Chieftain
- John Campbell Aird of Craignish, natural son of the above, 14th Laird and 15th Chieftain
- John Campbell, second son of the above, 15th Laird and 16th Chieftain
- Dugald Campbell, 16th Laird, 17th Chieftain
- Gillespic Campbell, second son of the above, 17th Laird, 18th Chieftain, died without children

The rightful heir was now Charles 'Tearlach Mor' Campbell, of Corranmore, Craignish, first of Clan Tearlach. Charles was the nephew of Dugald Campbell, 11th Laird and 12th Chieftain. But Charles had been banished from Argyll, and the lands of Craignish reverted to the Earls of Argyll.

== Campbells of Barrichbeyan in Craignish ==
The descendants of Donald McEan Gorm Campbell, 10th laird and 11th Chieftain of Craignish, retained Barrichebean and were fortunate enough to buy back the greater part of the estate of Craignish between 1550 and 1680, which they possessed under the patronymic MacDoil Vic Ean.

- John Campbell, invested as 2nd Baron of Barrichibean in 1492, son of the 10th Laird
- Donald Campbell, invested as the 3rd Baron, 1532
- Iain Campbell, invested as the 4th Baron, 1544
- Donald Campbell, invested as the 5th Baron, 1562
- John Campbell, invested as the 6th Baron, 1569
- Donald Campbell, 7th Baron
- George Campbell, 8th Baron
- Dugald Campbell, 9th Baron
- Captain Dugald Campbell, 10th Baron
- Colin Campbell, 11th Baron

== Clan Tearlach and the Inverneill Campbells ==
- John 'Ean Gorm' Campbell, 9th Laird and 10th Chieftain of Clan Campbell of Craignish
- Archibald Campbell, eldest son and heir of, but predeceased, the 10th Chieftain of Craignish
- Charles 'Tearlach Mor' Campbell, of Corranmore, Craignish, first of 'Tearlach,' rightful heir of Dugald Oig, 14th of Craignish
- John Campbell McKerlich (d.1575), 2nd Chief of Clan Tearlach
- Charles Campbell McKerlich (d.1607), of Ardconaig, 3rd Chief of Clan Tearlach
- 'Crippled' John Campbell McKerlich, of Easter Duncrosk, 4th Chief of Clan Tearlach
- 'Mild' Patrick Campbell (k.1676), of Morinche, 5th of Tearlach
- Charles 'Tearlach Ban' Campbell (1650–1723), 6th of Tearlach, Baron Baillie and 1st of Tuerechan, Glenlochy
- Patrick Campbell (1675–1753), 7th of Tearlach, 2nd of Tuerechan
- James Campbell (1706–1760), 8th of Tearlach, 3rd of Tuerechan, Commissary of the Western Isles
- Sir James Campbell (1737–1805) Kt., M.P., 9th of Tearlach, 2nd of Inverneill

When the direct line of the Campbells of Craignish ended in 1544, the rightful heir, a collateral relative by the name of Charles 'Tearlach Mor' Campbell of Corranmore in Craignish had the misfortune to kill Gillies of Glenmore in a brawl. This compelled him to flee to Perthshire where he settled at Lochtayside under the protection of the Breadalbane family. This unfortunate event therefore prevented Charles from claiming the estate, and so it fell into the hands of the Earls (later Dukes) of Argyll.

Charles' descendant, Sir James Campbell (1737–1805) of Killin, Perthshire, and the 2nd of Inverneill, was recognised by the Lord Lyon King of Arms as the 9th Chieftain of the Clan Tearlach branch of Clan Campbell. A grandson of Duncan Campbell 8th of Inverneill in the 1980s owned one of the apartments at Craignish Castle. The arms of Campbell of Inverneill are those of Campbell of Craignish differenced by the addition of "a bordure azure" (a blue border).

The first and third Campbells of Inverneill (General Sir Archibald Campbell of Inverneill and Sir James Campbell of Inverneill, 1st Bt.) were interred at Westminster Abbey in what is now known as Poets' Corner. The second, Sir James Campbell of Inverneill and many succeeding Campbells of Inverneill are interred in the Campbell of Inverneill Mausoleum, though the late Dr John Lorne Campbell of Inverneill (and of Canna) is interred on the Isle of Canna where he had lived for over 50 years. The estates of Inverneill, with the exception of the Mausoleum and Inverneill Island, were sold in the 1950s. Inverneill Island remains in the ownership of the present Campbell of Inverneill. One part of the inheritance which did not revert to the Argylls was the small Barony of Barrichibean, which John Campbell had inherited from his mother's father. This Barony is not currently possessed by anyone today, but genealogical records point to some likely successors.

Barons Craignish and von Laurentz[edit]

The Barony of Craignish was revived towards the end of the 19th Century when, in 1882, Ronald MacLeay Laurentz Campbell was created Baron Craignish by the Duke of Saxe-Coburg-Gotha. In January 1883 he was granted permission to use the title in the United Kingdom. Three years later in 1886, his younger brother, Edmund Kempt Laurentz Campbell was similarly ennobled, becoming Baron Campbell of Laurentz. Again like his brother, he was granted permission to use this title in the United Kingdom in a Royal Warrant dated 14 February 1887. Edmund Campbell had distinguished himself in August 1870 during the Franco-Prussian War. On 16 August at the battle of Mars-La-Tour/Gravelotte he was wounded leading a cavalry charge against the French and subsequently awarded the Iron Cross. Both brothers served as aides-de-camp to the Duke of Saxe-Coburg-Gotha. Edmund Campbell's marriage was childless and with his death in 1917, the Barony became extinct. His wife, Sarah Elizabeth Campbell, published a book in 1913 called 'My Motor Milestones: How to Tour in a Car', and was a member of the Italian Greyhound Club. Edmund Campbell's older brother Ronald died in 1897, being succeeded by his son, also called Ronald, who became the 2nd Baron Craignish. He died in 1920 without issue causing his Barony to become extinct also.

- Ronald MacLeay Laurentz Campbell, 1st Baron Craignish
- Ronald Campbell, 2nd Baron Craignish
- Edmund Kempt Laurentz Campbell, Baron of Laurentz
- Sarah Elizabeth Campbell, Baroness of Laurentz

== Incumbent ==
The title 'Laird of Craignish' is no longer used, because the title 'Laird' conveys a sense of ownership of land, and the Craignish estates were lost long ago (see above). However, most of these properties have since been sold on.

The House of Craignish represents thousands of Campbells worldwide, but currently no Chieftain has been identified.

The title 'Baron Campbell von Laurents' is a German title, which was restricted in inheritance to the male line of the original holder, meaning it is now extinct.

== See also ==
- Carter-Campbell of Possil
- Inverneill House
