= Joseph Henry Banks =

British Commandant and instructor of the Auckland Militia

Lt.-Colonel Joseph Henry Banks
- Born: 10 May 1843; Corfu, Greece
- Died: c. 1916; Nuwara Eliya, Sri Lanka
- Military career
- Allegiance: United Kingdom
- Branch: British Army
- Rank: Lieutenant-Colonel
- Unit: 7th Dragoon Guards
- Commands: Auckland Militia; 6th New Zealand Mounted Rifles
- Conflicts: Anglo-Egyptian War; Second Boer War

Lieutenant-Colonel Joseph Henry Banks (1843–1916) was the British Commandant and instructor of the Auckland Militia. The first six of the ten contingents of the New Zealand Mounted Rifles were raised and trained for overseas combat in the Boer Wars, becoming the core of the modern New Zealand Army.

== Military background ==
Joseph was born 10 May 1843, at Corfu, Greece, where his father, soldier William Henry Banks (1817–1880), was then billeted with the Royal Artillery. His mother, Ann Anderson, was formerly a seamstress of Carlisle, Cumbria. In November 1854, William Banks was Sergeant-Major of Field Battery 'H' with the Royal Artillery, then engaged at the Battle of Inkerman where he had his horse shot from under him. Following the battle, Brigadier-General Sir Richard Dacres, sanctioned by Field-Marshal Lord Raglan, recommended him for a commission arising from an act of "distinguished conduct in the field". This was approved by the Horse Guards in May 1855, when he was raised to the rank of lieutenant. Having started his career in 1838 as a gunner, William Banks rose to brevet major and was retired on full pay in 1872 with the honorary rank of lieutenant colonel, 97th Regiment of Foot – a considerable achievement for the time.

== Early career ==
In 1861, Joseph's father (then a captain) sought to obtain a commission for his son both within the regular British army and with a colonial regiment, but he was turned down in both cases. In 1862, Joseph sat and passed his entry exams to the Royal Military College, Sandhurst, but did not attend, probably due to the family's inability to find the funds to send him there. He again passed his exams for a direct commission in 1863, but on being offered a commission "with purchase" in the Gold Coast Regiment, the family could not raise the required capital.

Despite these best efforts to gain a commission, in December 1864, Banks was forced to enlist as a private soldier with the 17th Royal Lancers (known as the "Duke of Cambridge's Own"). He was promoted corporal the following year and sergeant in 1867. His father again sought to further Joseph's career by invoking the interest of the commander-in-chief, Prince George, Duke of Cambridge. Colonel Drury Curzon Drury-Lowe, commander of the 17th Lancers, who had just promoted "this fine young soldier" to sergeant, was able to recommend him for a commission two months later. On 26 June 1867, Banks was finally commissioned as an ensign with the 24th (The 2nd Warwickshire) Regiment of Foot. Only a few weeks before, Gonville Bromhead VC also joined that regiment as an ensign, and he and Banks served alongside one another for eight years.

== British Cavalry ==
Banks was promoted to second lieutenant and then lieutenant of the 2nd Battalion of the 24th Foot. In 1875, Banks transferred to the 12th Royal Lancers as adjutant to the regiment. In 1880, having been promoted to captain, Banks again transferred to another cavalry regiment, the 7th Dragoon Guards, to which he remained attached for the remainder of his career.

With the 7th Dragoons, he took part in the 1882 Egyptian Campaign, serving on Lord Kitchener's staff as brigade major to the cavalry in the Army of Occupation at Egypt. Banks saw action at Massawa, where (similarly to his father at the Battle of Inkerman) he had his horse shot from under him. He also took part in the Moonlight Charge at Kassassin during the Battle of Tel el-Kebir. For his part, he received the Egypt Medal (1882–1889), and the Turkish awards of the Khedive Bronze Star and the Order of the Medjidie, 5th Class.

In 1883, the 7th Dragoon Guards removed to the Punjab, India, where in 1885 Banks was promoted to major. There he was appointed commandant of the Kasauli Hill Depot. He enjoyed several other staff and regimental appointments, including that of musketry instructor to the Dragoon Guards and officiating assistant adjutant-general of the Bombay Army under Field Marshal Lord Roberts V.C. Banks retired on half-pay, on his 48th birthday, 1891. From the Punjab he removed with his family to Nuwara Eliya, Ceylon.

== New Zealand Mounted Rifles ==
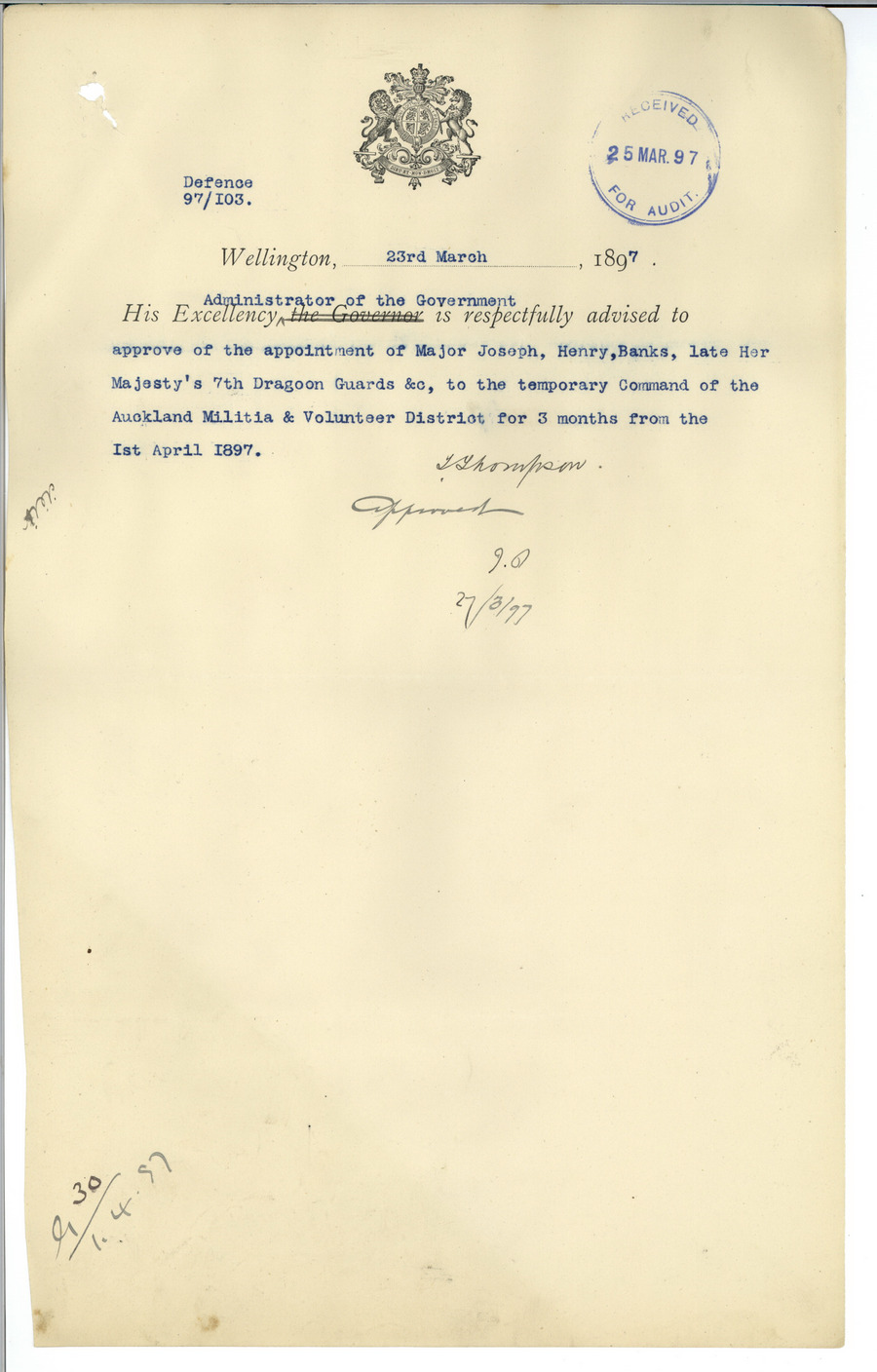
Appointment of Major Joseph Henry Banks to temporary command of the Auckland Militia and Volunteer District from 1st April, 1897. Taken from personnel file (1899 - 1902)

In 1895, Banks was brought out of retirement and posted to New Zealand to instruct the Colony's militia. In 1897, he was invited to apply for the post of temporary commandant of the Auckland Militia and North Island Volunteers, with the temporary rank of lieutenant colonel in the New Zealand Militia. With the permission of Horse Guards in London, he took up the appointment on 1 April 1897, initially for a period of three months. The appointment was renewed every three months until April 1898, when it became a permanent position. In this capacity, Banks raised and trained the Auckland detachments of the first six of the ten contingents of the New Zealand Mounted Rifles. Banks was a skilled horseman and polo player, making polo compulsory for the troops he was training in practice for combat on horseback.

In 1901, Banks accompanied the 6th Mounted Rifles and embarked to South Africa for service in the Boer Wars. He was joined by his eldest son, Lieutenant Harry Cecil Banks (1878–1906) R.A., who had come the previous year with the 2nd Mounted Rifles, and was then attached to the 78th Battery of the Royal Field Artillery under the command of Banks's brother-in-law, Lt.-Colonel Duncan Campbell Carter (1856–1942). Banks' second son, Bertram, accompanied his father to South Africa as lieutenant and adjutant of the 6th Mounted Rifles, until they returned in 1902, when he transferred to the 10th Mounted Rifles until the end of the war. 1902 also saw Major-General Sir James Melville Babington take over as commander of the New Zealand Defence Force.

As commander of the 6th New Zealand Mounted Rifles, Colonel Banks led this troop into action at the Transvaal and the Orange River Colony. In August 1901, Lord Kitchener, on whose staff Banks had served as brigade major in Egypt, requested that he take temporary command of Remounts until rejoining the 6th Mounted Rifles for their return to New Zealand in May 1902. For his service in the Boer Wars, Banks received the King's South Africa Medal and five clasps.

Shortly before his departure from South Africa, Banks retired from the regular army and received his final promotion in the British Army to that of lieutenant colonel, 7th Dragoon Guards, 8 April 1902. The British Army and Navy Gazette of 17 May 1902, carried the following notice:

Half Pay – Major J.H. Banks, retired pay, to be Lieut. Colonel. Memorandum – Lieut. Colonel J.H. Banks, half-pay, retires on retired pay. These announcements require explanation. The officer referred to left the 7th Dragoon Guards some years ago as a major. Since then, he has been rendering admirable service in connection with the New Zealand local forces, and it is due largely to his zeal and example that the New Zealanders have proved such excellent war material in South Africa. It was felt that his service deserved recognition, as his labours have been incessant and his popularity is very great. Hence his promotion to half-pay which enables him to retire on a higher rate of pension.

In 1910, five years after Banks left New Zealand, the contingents he had raised, trained and accompanied into battle were re-organised into professional regular regiments, becoming the New Zealand Mounted Rifles Brigade, which was the nucleus of the modern New Zealand Army.

== Retirement ==
After his final retirement, Banks remained in New Zealand until 1905. He had become involved in the Auckland Racing Club and the Auckland Trotting Club. He remained in New Zealand possibly still in an advisory capacity to the militia, and was also called upon for local military ceremonies and inspections:

"Last week, Colonel Banks visited Coromandel, and reviewed the local martial array. The heat was very oppressive and the evolutions somewhat brisk. The sun's rays were somewhat striking, but one of the officers of the corps had come provided for either heat or rain. He took shelter from the sun under his umbrella. Presently, Colonel Banks passed along the line, and, with remarkable gallantry, the local officer proffered a portion of his kindly shelter to his superior officer. That stern warrior looked with ineffable scorn at the subaltern, took his measure from head to toe, and then, more in sorrow than in anger, said, "Well, well, this is the first time I have seen a volunteer on service take shelter under an umbrella; from henceforth this corps must be called the 'Gingham Corps'."

Banks was also an artist, and some of his pen and ink drawings of the events in his campaigns were hung in the Portsmouth Museum. In recognition of his contribution to the reputation of the New Zealand army under combat, his medals and military memorabilia were donated to the Queen Elizabeth II Army Memorial Museum at Waiouru, North Island, in 1996.

== Family ==
On 9 September 1876, at the Church of St. Nicholas in Chadlington, Oxfordshire, Banks married (Frances) Edith Carter (1854–1950). She was the eldest daughter of Willoughby Harcourt Carter and his wife Eliza Palmes (1831–1903), of the Palmes family, the third daughter of George Palmes (1776–1851), J.P., D.L., of Naburn Hall, Yorkshire. They had three sons and two daughters.

Banks died at his home at Nuwara Eliya, Sri Lanka, in 1916.
