= Hector (DJ) =

DJ and producer (b. 1980)

- Born: Hector Murillo; 23 September 1980 (age 45)
- Origin: Guadalajara, Mexico
- Genres: Tech house, house, techno, minimal
- Occupation: DJ
- Years active: 2009–present
- Labels: VL Recordings, VLACK, Mobilee, Desolat, Tsuba, Phonica

Hector (born 23 September 1980) is a Mexican DJ and producer from Guadalajara. Hector has released on labels such a Mobilee, Tsuba, Phonica and his own VL Recordings & VLACK imprints.

== Early life ==
Before becoming a DJ hector played professional football for Club Atlas but had his career stunted due to a knee injury. Hector was first introduced to electronic music through some international students from the UK studying in Guadalajara. After leaving school at the age of 18 and no longer able to play football, Hector decided to move to London despite not speaking any English. Whilst living in London Hector secured a job at Phonica Records in Soho after meeting the owner, Simon Rigg, in Ibiza. It was here that he met Anja Schnieder & Loco Dice who would later give him jobs on their respective labels, Mobilee & Desolat.

== Discography ==
- Hide EP (2012)
- Haunted EP (2014)
