= Sir James Campbell, 1st Baronet =

British Army general (1763-1819)

Lieutenant-General Sir James Campbell Bt GCH
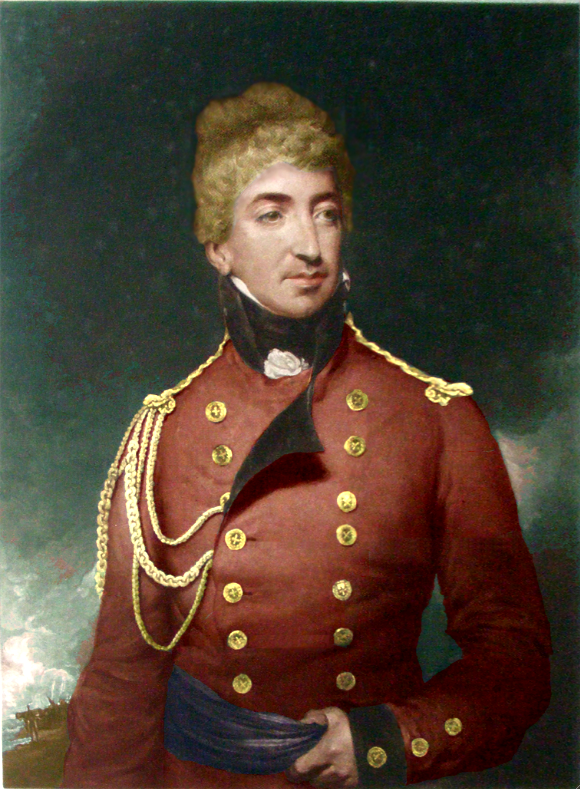
- Born: 25 May 1763; Inveraray, Argyll
- Died: 5 June 1819 (aged 56)
- Burial place: Westminster Abbey
- Spouse: Agnes Margaret Hunter
- Relatives: Sir Archibald Campbell; Willoughby Harcourt Carter; Alexander Campbell of Possil; George Carter-Campbell; Duncan Carter-Campbell of Possil
- Military career
- Allegiance: United Kingdom
- Branch: British Army
- Service years: 1780–1819
- Rank: Lieutenant-general
- Conflicts: American Revolutionary War; Third Anglo-Mysore War; French Revolutionary Wars; Napoleonic Wars; Anglo-Russian invasion of Naples

Lieutenant-General Sir James Campbell, 1st Baronet, GCH (25 May 1763 – 5 June 1819) was a British Army officer, politician and colonial administrator. He was Governor and Commander-in-Chief of the Ionian Islands, Adjutant-General to the British Forces and Heritable Usher of the White Rod for Scotland. He is buried at Westminster Abbey.

== Birth ==
The eldest son of Sir James Campbell, of Killean, 2nd of Inverneill House, Heritable Usher of the White Rod for Scotland and Member of Parliament for the Stirling Burghs. His father was recognized as the 9th Chief of Clan Tearlach, a branch of Campbell of Craignish, by the Lord Lyon King of Arms in 1791. He was a nephew of his father's brother, General Sir Archibald Campbell, the Governor of Madras who purchased the Inverneill estate in 1773. His mother, Jean (died 1805), was the daughter of John Campbell of Askomil, Argyll, of the Ballachlavan Campbells. His sister, Jane Campbell, was the first woman to petition a private bill get a full divorce in the United Kingdom.

== Military career ==
Campbell was commissioned into the 1st Royal Scots Regiment of Foot in 1780, making lieutenant the following year. He immediately exchanged into the 60th (Royal American) Regiment, serving with them during the last two campaigns of the American War of Independence. On its conclusion, he was promoted to captain in 1783. In 1787, he joined the 73rd (Perthshire) Regiment of Foot in India, as aide-de-camp to his uncle, General Sir Archibald Campbell, who served as the Governor of Madras until 1789. He exchanged into the 19th Light Dragoons, serving in the three campaigns of the Third Anglo-Mysore War under Lord Cornwallis against Tippoo Sahib.

In March 1794, he was promoted to major, and on returning to England in November of that year was promoted to lieutenant colonel of the Cheshire Fencibles. He served in the Channel Islands and Ireland until 1800, when he was appointed assistant Adjutant-General at the Horse Guards. In 1801, he was promoted colonel by brevet and in 1804 he was appointed lieutenant colonel of the 61st (South Gloucestershire) Regiment of Foot. In 1805, he was appointed adjutant general to the force destined for the Mediterranean under Sir James Henry Craig for the Anglo-Russian invasion of Naples. He acted in that capacity from 1805 to 1813, and was only absent on the occasion of the Battle of Maida, winning the confidence of all the generals who held command in Sicily.

== Governor of the Ionian Islands ==
In 1810, General Cavaignac managed to get 3,500 men safely across the Straits of Messina, placing one battalion on the cliffs while the others were fast disembarking. Campbell, by a rapid attack with the Royal Scots Fusiliers, repelled the disembarking battalions and forced those already landed to surrender. Forty three officers and over eight hundred men were taken prisoners, with a loss to the British of only three men wounded.

During his tenure of office, in 1808, he had been promoted major general, and lieutenant general in 1813. The following year, in 1814, he was appointed to take possession of the Ionian Islands, and when the French Governor, François-Xavier Donzelot, refused to hand over the government of the Islands, Campbell threatened to open fire. He remained in the Ionian Islands as Governor and Commander-in-Chief until 1816, when Sir Thomas Maitland was appointed Lord High Commissioner. A French authority stated that Campbell acted in a most despotic way as governor, saying that he abolished the university, the academy and the press established by the French.

He returned to England in 1816. The following year he was made Knight Grand Cross of Hanover of the Royal Guelphic Order. On 3 October 1818, he was created the 1st (and last) Baronet of Inverneill. He was a Commander of the Order of Saint Ferdinand and of Merit.

== Private life ==
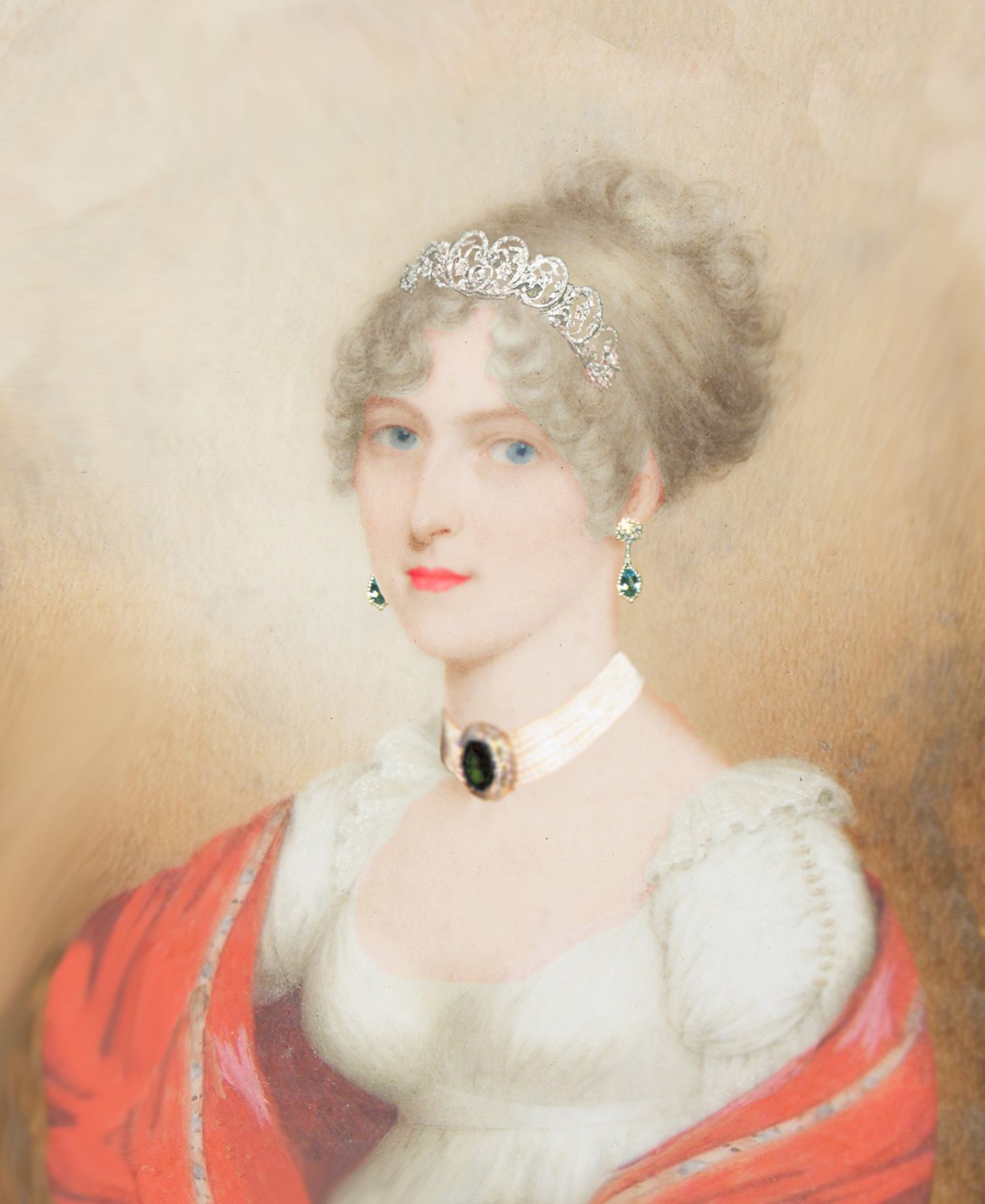
(Mrs James) Lady Campbell of Inverneill.

Following the death of his father in 1805, he became the 10th Chief of Clan Tearlach and inherited the position of Heritable Usher of the White Rod for Scotland, selling the title to Sir Patrick Walker in 1806. In 1794, he had married Agnes Margaret, the daughter of one of the most distinguished surgeons and scientists of his day, John Hunter, for whom the Hunterian Society of London is named. Agnes' mother, Anne (Home) Hunter, daughter of Robert Boyne Home of Greenlaw Castle, Berwickshire, and the sister of Sir Everard Home, 1st Bt., of Well Manor, Southampton. She was described by the author Fanny Burney as "extremely pretty and reckoned very ingenious". Some of the poems of Agnes' mother, Anne Home were used to the music of Joseph Haydn.

Campbell was very close to his mother-in-law, Anne Hunter, and provided her with a small annuity. As such, Mrs Hunter was greatly saddened and disappointed in her daughter when she separated from Campbell. Campbell died without issue 5 June 1819, and is buried with his own monument at Westminster Abbey, near to his distinguished uncle General Sir Archibald Campbell. After his death his baronetcy became extinct and the Inverneill estate was passed to his brothers, the 4th and 5th lairds of Inverneill.

== See also ==
- Carter-Campbell of Possil

Baronetage of the United Kingdom
New creation	Baronet (of Inverneil); 1818–1819	Extinct
Preceded by McMahon baronets	Campbell baronets of Inverneil; 3 October 1818	Succeeded by Powell baronets
