= Hector (1897 steamboat) =

US steamboat (1897–1913)

History
- Name: Hector
- Route: San Juan Islands, Puget Sound
- Launched: 1897
- Out of service: 1913
- Identification: U.S. Registry #96874
- Fate: Explosion and fire (total loss), crew rescued.

General characteristics
- Type: steam tug, inland steamboat, tug, cannery tender
- Tonnage: 7 gross; 5 regist.
- Length: 41.7 ft (12.71 m)
- Beam: 9 ft (2.74 m)
- Depth: 3 ft (0.91 m) depth of hold
- Installed power: steam engine
- Propulsion: propeller
- Crew: One (per registry)

Hector was a small steam vessel built in Roche Harbor, Washington in 1897. The vessel was worked as a cannery tender and a tug boat in the San Juan Islands and on Puget Sound from 1897 to 1913.

== Career ==
Hector was built for the brothers Capt. Thomas Gawley and Engineer Hector Gawley of Lopez Island. The vessel was used for some years as a chartered fish-trap tender in the San Juan Islands. Later Hector was sold and transferred to Tacoma where it was operated as a tug.

== Explosion and fire ==
In April 1913, Hector, making the first trip after having refitted with a new boiler was raising steam off Purdy Spit when an apparent coal gas explosion occurred. Harold Lanning was able to rescue the crew with his 26 ft (7.92 m) motor vessel. The burned hull of Hector was towed to the shore, where beachcombers eventually removed everything usable from the hulk.
