= List of storms named Hector =

The name Hector has been used for nine tropical cyclones in the Eastern Pacific Ocean:

- Hurricane Hector (1978) – a Category 4 hurricane
- Hurricane Hector (1982) – a Category 1 hurricane
- Hurricane Hector (1988) – a Category 4 hurricane; strongest of its season
- Tropical Storm Hector (1994) – a tropical storm that affected the Baja California Peninsula
- Hurricane Hector (2000) – a Category 1 hurricane whose remnants affected Hawaii
- Hurricane Hector (2006) – a Category 2 hurricane that did not affect land
- Tropical Storm Hector (2012) – a tropical storm that affected Southwestern Mexico
- Hurricane Hector (2018) – a long-lived and strong Category 4 hurricane that crossed into the Western Pacific as a minimal tropical storm
- Tropical Storm Hector (2024) – a tropical storm that did not affect land

The name Hector has been used for one tropical cyclone in the Australian region:

- Cyclone Hector (1986) – caused significant flooding in western Australia

The name Hector has been used for one European windstorm:

- Storm Hector (2018)
