= McEacharn =

MacEacharn, McEacharn
Origin
- Language: Gaelic

Other names
- Variant forms: MacEachern, McEachern

MacEacharn and McEacharn are surnames.

== People with the surnames ==
McEachern

- Malcolm McEacharn – (1852–1910) – English born, Australian – Mayor of Melbourne.
