= Eachann =

- Gender: Masculine
- Language: Scottish Gaelic

Origin
- Language: Celtic
- Derivation: each + donn
- Meaning: 1. "horse" + "lord"; 2. "horse" + "brown"

Other names
- Cognate: Eachdonn
- Anglicisations: Hector (given name), Hector (surname)
- See also: MacEachainn · Hawkins · Ó hEacháin

Eachann is a masculine given name in Scottish Gaelic. A similar and possibly related early form of the name was Eachdonn. The name is composed of two elements; the first element is each, meaning "horse". The second element is donn, which has been given two different meanings. One proposed meaning is "brown"; another proposed meaning is "lord". The early Gaelic form of the name, Eachdonn, was 'confused' with the Norse Hakon (which is etymologically unrelated).

Eachann has often been Anglicised as Hector (which is also etymologically unrelated to Eachann).

The Scottish Gaelic surname MacEachainn is a patronymic form of the given name (meaning "son of Eachann").

== People with the given name ==
- Eachann Mac Goraidh MacAlasdair, chief of Clan MacAlister.
- Eachann Maclean, may refer to many people.

== People with the given name as part of a patronymic name ==
- Goraidh Mac Eachann MacAlasdair, Chief of Clan MacAlister, son of Eachann Mac Goraidh MacAlasdair.
- Mairead inghean Eachainn, the spouse of Alexander Stewart, 1st Earl of Buchan, and mother of Alexander Stewart, Earl of Mar.
