= Heitor =

Heitor (Portuguese pronunciation: [ej'toɾ]) is a given name (Hector in the Portuguese language) which may refer to:

- Heitor (footballer, born 1898) (1898–1972), Ettore Marcelino Dominguez, Brazilian football striker
- Heitor (footballer, born 1964) Heitor Camarin Junior, Brazilian football right–back
- Heitor (Portuguese footballer) (born 1978), Portuguese football player and coach
- Heitor (footballer, born April 2000), Heitor Marinho dos Santos, Brazilian football centre-back
- Heitor (footballer, born November 2000), Heitor Rodrigues da Fonseca, Brazilian football right-back
- Heitor Canalli (1907–1990), Brazilian football player
- Heitor Dhalia (born 1970), Brazilian film director and screenwriter
- Heitor Pereira (born 1960), Brazilian musician
  - Heitor TP, a 1994 album by Heitor Pereira
- Heitor da Silva Costa (1873–1947), Brazilian civil engineer and designer of the Christ the Redeemer monument
- Heitor Villa-Lobos (1887–1959), Brazilian composer

== See also ==
- Hector
