= HMS Hector =

Eleven ships of the British Royal Navy have borne the name HMS Hector, named after the Trojan hero Hector in the Iliad.

- The first HMS Hector (1643) was a 22-gun ship sold in 1656.
- The second HMS Hector (1653) was a 30-gun ship sold in 1657.
- The third HMS Hector (1656) was a 22-gun ship sunk by the Dutch Navy in 1665.
- The fourth HMS Hector (1703) was a 44-gun fourth rate launched in 1703 and broken up in 1742.
- The fifth HMS Hector (1743) was another 44-gun fourth rate sold in 1762.
- The sixth HMS Hector (1763) was cutter purchased in 1763 and sold in 1773.
- The seventh HMS Hector (1774) was a 74-gun third rate launched at Deptford in 1774 and converted to a prison ship in 1808.
- The eighth HMS Hector (1782) was a 74-gun third rate captured from France in April 1782 that foundered in October.
- The ninth HMS Hector (1862) was the first ship of her class of iron steam propelled battleships and launched in 1862, and scrapped in 1905.
- The tenth HMS Hector (1915) was a requisitioned merchant ship used as a kite balloon ship in the Dardanelles campaign (1915), and returned to civil service in 1918.
- The eleventh HMS Hector (F45) was an armed merchant cruiser that served in World War II and was damaged beyond repair by Japanese aircraft in 1942.
