= Hector (API) =

Client API for Apache Cassandra

- Original author: Ran Tavory
- Final release: 2.0 / July 16, 2014; 11 years ago
- Repository: github.com/hector-client/hector
- Written in: Java
- Type: Column-oriented DBMS
- License: MIT License
- Website: prettyprint.me/2010/02/23/hector-a-java-cassandra-client/

Hector is a high-level client API for Apache Cassandra. Named after Hector, a warrior of Troy in Greek mythology, it is a substitute for the Cassandra Java Client, or Thrift, that is encapsulated by Hector. It also has Maven repository access.

== History ==
As Cassandra is shipped with the low-level Thrift protocol, there was a potential to develop a better protocol for application developers. Hector was developed by Ran Tavory as a high-level interface that overlays the shortcomings of Thrift. It is licensed with the MIT License that allows to use, modify, split and change the design.

== Features ==
The high-level features of Hector are

- A high-level object oriented interface to Cassandra: It is mainly inspired by the Cassandra-java-client. The API is defined in the Keyspace interface.
- Connection pooling. As in high-scale applications, the usual pattern for DAOs is a large number of reads/writes. It is too expensive for clients to open new connections with each request. So, a client may easily run out of available sockets, if it operates fast enough. Hector provides connection pooling and a nice framework that manages the details.
- Failover support: As Cassandra is a distributed data store where hosts (nodes) may go down. Hector has its own failover policy.

| Type | Comment |
|---|---|
| FAIL_FAST | If an error occurs, it fails |
| ON_FAIL_TRY_ONE_NEXT_AVAILABLE | Tries one more host before giving up |
| ON_FAIL_TRY_ALL_AVAILABLE | Tries all available hosts before giving up |

- JMX support: Hector exposes JMX for many important runtime metrics, such as number of available connections, idle connections, error statistics.
- Load balancing: A simple load balancing exists in the newer version.
- Supports the command design pattern to allow clients to concentrate on their business logic and let Hector take care of the required plumbing.

=== Availability metrics ===
Hector exposes availability counters and statistics through JMX.

=== Load balancing ===
Hector follows two load balancing policies with the LoadBalancingPolicy interface. The default is called RoundRobinBalancingPolicy and is a simple round-robin distribution algorithm. The LeastActiveBalancingPolicy routes requests to the pools having the lowest number of active connections, ensuring a good spread of utilisation across the cluster. .

=== Pooling ===
The ExhaustedPolicy determines how the underlying client connection pools are controlled. Currently, three options are available:

| Type | Comment |
|---|---|
| WHEN_EXHAUSTED_FAIL | Fails acquisition when no more clients are available |
| WHEN_EXHAUSTED_GROW | The pool is automatically increased to react to load increases |
| WHEN_EXHAUSTED_BLOCK | Block on acquisition until a client becomes available (the default) |

== Code examples ==
As an example, an implementation of a simple distributed hashtable over Cassandra is listed.

 /**
   * Insert a new value keyed by key
   * @param key Key for the value
   * @param value the String value to insert
   */
  public void insert(final String key, final String value) throws Exception {
    execute(new Command(){
      public Void execute(final Keyspace ks) throws Exception {
        ks.insert(key, createColumnPath(COLUMN_NAME), bytes(value));
        return null;
      }
    });
  }

  /**
   * Get a string value.
   * @return The string value; null if no value exists for the given key.
   */
  public String get(final String key) throws Exception {
    return execute(new Command(){
      public String execute(final Keyspace ks) throws Exception {
        try {
          return string(ks.getColumn(key, createColumnPath(COLUMN_NAME)).getValue());
        } catch (NotFoundException e) {
          return null;
        }
      }
    });
  }

  /**
   * Delete a key from cassandra
   */
  public void delete(final String key) throws Exception {
    execute(new Command(){
      public Void execute(final Keyspace ks) throws Exception {
        ks.remove(key, createColumnPath(COLUMN_NAME));
        return null;
      }
    });
  }
