= Craignish =

Peninsula in Argyll and Bute, Scotland

- Peninsula
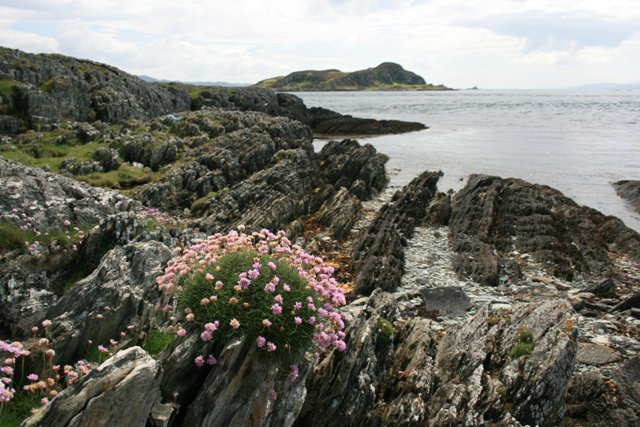
- Thrift, Craignish Point

- Location within Scotland
- Coordinates: 56°11′35″N 5°33′0″W
- Grid position: NM 79844 05722
- Location: Argyll and Bute, Scotland

Craignish (Scottish Gaelic, Creiginis) is a peninsula in Argyll and Bute, on the west coast of Scotland. It lies around 25 miles (40 km) south of Oban, and 10 miles (16 km) north-west of Lochgilphead. The peninsula is around 5.5 miles (8.9 km) long, and is aligned along a north-east to south-west orientation, in common with much of the landform of coastal Argyll. To the south is Loch Craignish, which contains several small islands. To the north are the Slate Islands, with the island of Shuna closest. Jura is only 3 miles (4.8 km) west of Craignish Point, the southern tip of Craignish.

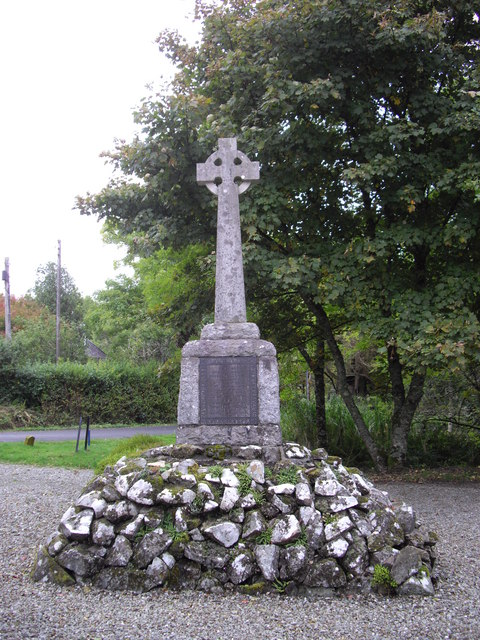
Craiignish war memorial

There are two main settlements on Craignish, Ardfern on the south coast, and the modern village of Craobh Haven, established in 1983 as a holiday resort and marina, on the north. A single-track road, the B8002, runs along the south shore of the peninsula. In October 2023 a landslip blocked the A816, which feeds the B8002, cutting-off the village from the south. Heavy rain caused 6,000 tonnes of earth to fall, blocking the road. The road was still blocked in November 2023.

== Historic monuments ==
There are a number of ruined duns on Craignish, as well as cup and ring marked rocks. One such site is Dunan Aula, a cist said to commemorate a Viking prince so-named, who fell in battle against the native Scots. At Kirkton, the remains of the early 13th-century chapel of Kilmarie still stand. A chapel on this site is said to have been founded by St Máel Ruba, from whom the modern name is derived. The chapel was repaired in the 19th century, and again in 1926, and now houses a collection of 14th- and 15th-century sculptured grave slabs.

Near the chapel is Craignish Castle, originally home of the Campbells of Craignish castle was established here in the early 12th century, although the extant tower house dates from the late 14th century at the earliest. The castle withstood a siege by Alasdair "Colkitto" MacDonald in the 1640s. A new wing was added between 1698 and 1710, and offices and stables were added around 1770. In 1800 the estate was sold to Campbell of Jura, and in 1837 a new mansion was built on the side of the tower house, replacing the earlier extensions. Design of the new mansion has been attributed to either William Burn or Joseph Gordon Davis. In 1850 the estate was sold again to the Gascoignes of Parlington Hall, Yorkshire, who made yet more changes. Half of the 1837 mansion has since been demolished, and a stair tower added on the new gable.

Close to Craobh Haven is Lunga, a 16th-century tower house originally known as Daill. This too was built by the Campbells of Craignish, before it was sold to the MacDougalls in around 1785. It has been in the MacDougall of Lunga family ever since, and is now partially run as bed and breakfast accommodation. A memorial to two of the MacDougalls of Lunga, father and son, who died in the First World War, stands at the edge of Craobh Haven.

The early 19th century paddle steamer PS Comet sank off Craignish Point on 13 December 1820.

== In literature ==
Naomi Mitchison wrote of a visit to Craignish with her family: "We are up here in an incredibly beautiful place thirty miles from a station, all very Celtic, islands and sunsets and sea lochs of blue paint. The gentry are rather alarming - those narrow cruel Highland faces, mouths and eyes a little twisted and arrogant and something too delicate and inbred about their hands and skin. But the farmers are capital red heads and very jolly to talk to, rather less dour than my own coast".

== In film ==
The Area has also featured in films

- Loch Craignish got a last minute role in the bond film From Russia With Love doubling as Yugoslavia. The scene was originally set to be filmed in Turkey but was moved due to production issues.
- The old Jura ferry pier at Craignish point was shown in The End We Start From.

== Sources ==
- A Visitor's Guide to Craignish, n.d.
- Coventry, Martin The Castles of Scotland; 3rd ed., Goblinshead, 2001
- Walker, Frank Arneil The Buildings of Scotland: Argyll and Bute, Penguin, 2000
