= Hector King =

Mexican singer

Héctor King
- Born: Héctor King Tamayo; May 4, 1982 (age 44)
- Origin: Culiacán, Mexico
- Genres: Pop; Latin; Classical
- Years active: 1996–present
- Labels: Warner Music Latina; Encino Sound Int. Little Box Records
- Website: hectorking.com

Héctor King (born May 4, 1982) is a Mexican recording artist who has worked in Latin America as well as the United States. King released the Spanish language album VIVE in 2006, followed-up by "The Sweet Spot", in English in 2009. His contemporary oratorio "La Vida" premiered in Mexico in 2011 and a highlights recording was released the following year.

== Biography ==
=== Early years ===
King was born in Culiacán, Mexico of parents Saul King and Martha Tamayo. As of 2007, his parents lived in Culiacán where his father works for the State Government. King's mother is a former Congresswoman and a former Senator in Mexico.

King began taking piano lessons at the age of 10, earning a degree in Contemporary Keyboard Execution from Yamaha Music five years later. He then moved on to the stage in regional theatre productions of The Sound of Music, Little Shop of Horrors and Joseph and the Amazing Technicolor Dreamcoat.

=== 1996–2002 ===
In the late 1990s, King moved to Monterrey, Mexico to train in classical music. While attending college King went on to compose the score for two musicals: Siempre Verde and Tilín Larín. He also entered the Festival de la Canción del Sistema ITESM (a renowned songwriting competition in Mexico) and won four major awards with his song "Vive": Best Lyric, Best Music, People's Choice Award and Song of the Year.

During this time, King joined Sergio, Federico and Jorge Velderráin to form a pop-rock band named Nitia. Without a label or management, Nitia went on to have two singles on Mexican radio: "Esta Noche" and "Renacer". The group disbanded after a couple of years, but in 2002 the Velderráin brothers (now as a band named Maqina.Love) and King collaborated in a pop compilation, Kemado Master, released regionally by Peerless/MCM/Warner Music. King's first single as a solo act, "Chubidubi", first received airplay in April 2002. However, without further support from the label and a well-organized tour, support in radio and record sales stalled.

Enticed by his longtime friend (later to become his manager) Mariana Guevara, who was then living in Los Angeles and working at a major publicity firm, King put together a demo of his songs, both in English and Spanish, and sent it to her. Within weeks King was preparing to perform his first US gig: a benefit concert for the Youth at Risk, held in July 2002 at the Warner Bros. Records lot in Hollywood.

== Encino Sound ==
=== VIVE ===
During that first brief stay in Los Angeles, King met producer/composer David Hewitt, who signed him to his US-based Encino Sound label. A couple of months later, King moved to Los Angeles to start work on the production of his first solo album.

In a move that would soon prove to be decisive for the future of Encino Sound, then CEO Bill Welty instructed King to put on hold all work done for his debut album as it had all been prepared for an English language release. Welty felt that King's appeal would be better understood by Latin audiences and thus it was decided that King's debut would be sung in his native tongue: Spanish.

VIVE was released in late 2005. The first single, the vallenato-infused "Tú Me Gustas," was picked up by almost one hundred radio stations from Puerto Rico to California.

=== 2006–2012 ===
King and his manager (Guevara) split amicably, putting a much-needed promotional tour on indefinite hold. At the same time, Encino Sound announced that it could not support VIVE due to financial hardship. The label was left practically bankrupt and inoperable.

King took the following months to revise the work he had begun on an English-language album, finally releasing it in January, 2009. The release of Hector King's English-language follow-up, "Primary Colors" was expected in late 2013 in the United States through Little Box Records, with exclusive online distribution. However, this has been pushed to 2014 at the earliest due to conflicting projects.

In 2012, a remaster of "VIVE" named "Por Debajo del Agua" was released digitally, alongside a 'highlights' recording of King's contemporary oratorio "La Vida". Currently, King is working on his third Spanish-language studio effort: "Con Los Pies en la Tierra".

=== Other works with ESI ===
Through the label, King also became involved in other projects for different artists. Between 2005 and 2007 King worked on the debut material for Mexican pop singer Ivan Beyer and American singer-songwriter Monica Mancillas. King can be heard in Mancilla's track "Sweat" from her album On The Brink as a featured singer. Beyer and King have been working together on another album since late 2007, though it's not clear when it will be released, because of conflicting label scheduling for Beyer.

In 2007 King co-produced and arranged My Favorite Things, classical mezzo-soprano Constance Jensen's album debut. The album showcased the vocalist's range when setting her voice against a collection of American standard songs, dressed in a contemporary pop arrangement. Jensen and King are set to begin a new collaboration consisting mostly of original material by King and other composers, with a release date yet to be determined.

== Works for the Stage ==
Between 2002 and 2008, Hector King worked extensively on several collaborations for the stage. Most notable, perhaps, are his stage adaptations of renowned Broadway musicals for Mexican audiences. Starting in 2002 with A Chorus Line, King's work (which includes writing the lyrics in Spanish, as well as the entire translation and adaptation of the libretto) has been very well received and has garnered him recognition in the press. Between 2007 and 2009 alone, King had five of his adaptations staged, all in Monterrey, Mexico: the Mexican premieres of Sweeney Todd, Footloose and Roméo et Juliette, de la Haine à l'Amour and the new Mexican productions of The Scarlet Pimpernel and RENT.

Also during this period, Hector began collaborating with Lux Boreal, one of Mexico's most important contemporary dance companies, based in Tijuana, Mexico. In 2005 King wrote the score and songs for Lux Boreal's original work "La Flor de Siete Hojas", which has been performed in numerous countries to universal acclaim. In late 2008 a new Lux Boreal entirely original choreography is expected to be staged, set to an unpublished piece by Hector King.

In 2010, King was commissioned to write a song commemorating Mexico's Bicentennial. The result was "Mucho Por Contar", an epic 6-minute-long narration of the songwriter's life history as a metaphor for the history of the country. It premiered in mid April in Monterrey, Mexico during a live concert.

King's oratorio "La Vida", loosely based on the Tanakh or Hebrew Bible is set to premiere in Monterrey, Mexico in April, 2011. It is King's first entirely original work for the stage. The concert includes several previously released songs (including Spanish language versions of material originally made public in English), as well as numbers written specifically for the oratorio. King wrote the lyrics and composed the music to every piece in the concert, except for "De Pie" (lyrics by Hector King, music by Hector King and Oma).

Further stage works include his Messa Solenne (a classical mass) and his first opera: Il Manoscrito, based on an original idea of King's and currently being developed and workshopped in Los Angeles.

== Discography ==
- Kemado Master 2002 Peerless/MCM/Warner Mexico
- Vive EP 2005 ESI Mexico
- VIVE 2006 ESI US/Mexico
- Tu Me Gustas EP 2006 ESI US
- Se Fue EP 2006 ESI US
- The Sweet Spot 2009 ESI US
- La Vida 2011 ESI US
- Por Debajo del Agua 2012 ESI US
- Con Los Pies en la Tierra 2014 LBR US

== Stage Credits as a Lyricist/Adapter ==
- A Chorus Line – 2002
- Sugar – 2003
- Todo Se Vale (Anything Goes) – 2005
- Sweeney Todd – 2007
- Romeo & Julieta (Romeo et Juliette: de l'haine a l'amour) – 2008
- La Pimpinela Escarlata (The Scarlet Pimpernel) – 2008
- Footloose – 2009
- RENT – 2009
- Anita la Huerfanita (Annie) – 2010
- Altar Boyz – 2011
- Despertar en Primavera (Spring Awakening) – 2012
- Legalmente Rubia (Legally Blonde) – 2012
- Grease – 2013
- Cinderella (Rodgers and Hammerstein's Cinderella) – 2014
- In The Heights – 2014
- Ghost, La Sombra del Amor (Ghost, The Musical) – 2015
- Shrek – 2015
- Oliver! – 2016
- El Rey y Yo – 2016
