= McEachern =

MacEachern, McEachern
- Language: Gaelic

Origin
- Meaning: son of Eichthighearn
- Region of origin: Ireland, Scotland

Other names
- Variant forms: Eichthighearn; MacEacharn; McEacharn

McEachern and MacEachern are Irish and Scottish surnames. The names are Anglicised forms of the Gaelic Mac Eichthigheirn, meaning "son of Eichthighearn". The personal name Eichthighearn is composed of two elements. The first is each, meaning "horse"; the second is tighearna, meaning "lord". The surnames MacEachern and McEachern can be represented in Scottish Gaelic by MacEachairn, and MacEacharna.

== People with the surnames ==
McEachern

- Alex McEachern, (1939–2025) Canadian politician in Alberta
- Allan McEachern (1926–2008) Canadian lawyer and judge
- Chase McEachern, Canadian campaigner for mandatory heart defibrillators
- Lon McEachern, American poker analyst
- Lula Dobbs McEachern (1874–1949), American teacher and religious leader
- Malcolm McEachern (1883–1945), Australian bass singer
- Murray McEachern (1915–1982), Canadian jazz trombonist and alto saxophonist
- Robert O. McEachern (1927–2008), American teacher and politician
- Shawn McEachern (born 1969), American ice hockey player and coach

MacEachern

- Angus Bernard MacEachern (1759–1835), Canadian Catholic bishop
- David MacEachern (born 1967), Canadian bobsledder
- Jared MacEachern (born 1980) American heavy metal musician
- Mackenzie MacEachern (born 1994), American ice hockey player
- Shane MacEachern (born 1967), Canadian ice hockey player
- Scott MacEachern (born 1960), Canadian anthropologist

== See also ==
- McEachern High School, a high school in Powder Springs, Georgia.
- McEachen (surname)
- McEacharn
