= MacEachainn =

- Gender: Masculine
- Language: Scottish Gaelic

Other gender
- Feminine: NicEachainn

Origin
- Language: Scottish Gaelic
- Derivation: mac + Eachainn
- Meaning: "son" + "of Eachann"

MacEachainn is a masculine surname in Scottish Gaelic. The name translates into English as "son of Eachann". The feminine form of the name is NicEachainn, which translates to "daughter of the son of Eachann". These surnames originated as a patronyms. However, they no longer refer to the actual name of the bearer's father or grandfather. There are numerous Anglicised forms of MacEachainn.

== Etymology ==
The Scottish Gaelic MacEachainn translates into English as "son of Eachann". The surname originated as a patronym. However, it no longer refers to the actual name of the bearer's father. The name Eachann is composed of two elements. The first element, each, translates to "horse". The second element, donn, has been translated two different ways: one translation attributed to this element is "brown"; the other translation is "lord".

== Feminine form ==
MacEachainn is a masculine surname. The form of this surname for females is NicEachainn. The feminine name translates into English as "daughter of the son of Eachann. Like the masculine form, this surname no longer refers to the actually name of the bearer's grandfather.

== Anglicised forms ==
Some of the Anglicised forms of MacEachainn are MacEachen, McEachen, and MacEachin, McEachin.

== Notable people ==
Catrìona Beathag Anna NicEachainn (Cathrine Beth Anne MacEachen) is a Gaelic language and history teacher in Nova Scotia, Canada. She has acted in multiple highly successful Gaelic language films such as An t-Inneal Espresso (2019).
