= Inverneill House =

Country house in Argyll, western Scotland

- Interactive map of the Inverneill House area

General information
- Architectural style: Georgian
- Location: Loch Fyne, Scotland
- Coordinates: 55.977889°N 5.45327°W (grid reference NR 8464 8148)

Inverneill House is a country house in Argyll, western Scotland. It stands on the west shore of Loch Fyne, around 4 miles (6.4 km) south of Lochgilphead. Although the house is not listed, the walled gardens and mausoleum on the estate are protected as category B listed buildings.

The lands of Inverneill first came into Campbell hands in 1480 when the lordship of Knapdale was granted to Colin Campbell, 1st Earl of Argyll. In 1773, it passed to a branch of Campbell of Craignish: Sir Archibald Campbell became the owner of the estate. Though neither the largest nor the grandest of his several estates, it was Archibald's favourite, but he was unable to live on the land as he was appointed Governor of Jamaica and then of Madras in India, dying a few months after his return. It was his elder brother, Sir James Campbell of Killean, Perthshire, who first made a home at Inverneill, using it as a summer 'cottage' for his family.

The house was of a good size in those days, having dining and drawing rooms, 8 bedrooms, a housekeeper's room, servants' rooms, pantry, kitchen and scullery, as well as outhouses containing wash house, laundry and dairy. The walled garden with its 20-foot (6.1 m) high wall containing two turrets was reputed to be one of the finest in Scotland for fruit and vegetables of all kinds.

Lt Col. Duncan Campbell, 7th of Inverneill, added the three-storey wing around 1890. The house was occupied by the Campbell family until 1955 when it was sold, though the family continue to own Inverneill Island. The last two occupants were the Misses Olive and Una Campbell. Their sister had married and became Mrs. Ysobel Stewart of Fasnacloich was the founder of the Scottish Country Dance Society and became its first Secretary. A country dance named "Inverneill House" was composed in her honour.

== Campbells of Inverneill from 1773 ==
- General Sir Archibald Campbell, 1st of Inverneill (1739-1791)
- Sir James Campbell, 2nd of Inverneill (1737-1805), M.P., of Killean
- Lt.-General Sir James Campbell, 1st and last Bt., of Inverneill; 3rd of Inverneill (1763-1819)
- Captain John Campbell, 4th of Inverneill (1766-1822)
- Duncan Campbell, 5th of Inverneill (1771-1840)
- James Archibald Campbell, 6th of Inverneill (1800-1878), D.L., J.P.
- Lt. Colonel Duncan Campbell, 7th of Inverneill (1842-1922), O.B.E., D.L., J.P.
- Lt. Colonel Duncan Campbell, 8th of Inverneill (1880-1954), J.P.
- John Lorne Campbell, 9th of Inverneill (1906-1996)
- Colin Campbell, 10th of Inverneill (1912-1998)
- Neill Diarmid Campbell, 11th of Inverneill (b. 1948)

== See also ==
- Carter-Campbell of Possil
- Campbell of Craignish
