= Archibald Campbell (British Army officer, born 1739) =

British Army officer, colonial administrator and politician (1739–1791)

Major-General Sir Archibald Campbell KB
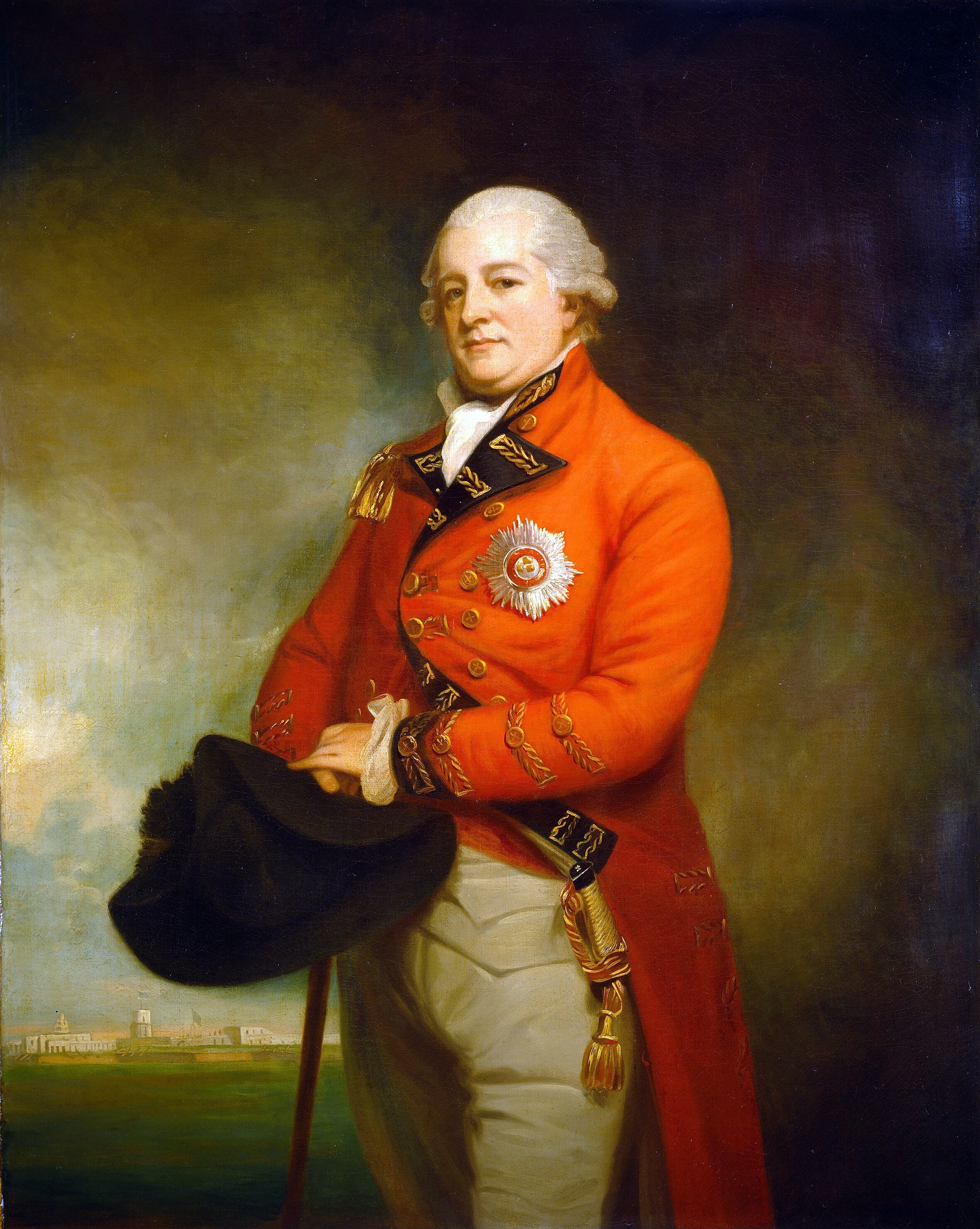
- Portrait by George Romney, c. 1792

Member of Parliament for Stirling Burghs
- In office 1789–1791
- Preceded by: James Campbell
- Succeeded by: Andrew Cochrane-Johnstone
- In office 1774–1780
- Preceded by: James Masterton
- Succeeded by: James Campbell

Governor of Madras
- In office 1786–1789
- Preceded by: George Macartney
- Succeeded by: William Medows

Governor of Jamaica
- In office 1781–1784
- Preceded by: John Dalling
- Succeeded by: Alured Clarke

Governor of Georgia
- In office 1778–1779
- Preceded by: James Wright
- Succeeded by: Jacques Marcus Prevost

Personal details
- Born: 21 August 1739 Inveraray, Scotland
- Died: 31 March 1791 (aged 51) Upper Grosvenor Street, London, England
- Resting place: Westminster Abbey
- Relatives: George Campbell of Inverneill; Alexander Campbell of Possil, George Carter-Campbell, Willoughby Harcourt Carter, James Campbell of Inverneill, Duncan Carter-Campbell of Possil
- Occupation: Colonial governor

Military service
- Allegiance: Great Britain
- Branch/service: British Army
- Years of service: 1758–1789
- Rank: Major general
- Battles/wars: Seven Years' War; American War of Independence

Major-General Sir Archibald Campbell KB (21 August 1739 – 31 March 1791) was a British Army officer, colonial administrator and politician who served as governor of Georgia, Jamaica, and Madras. He was also a major landowner in Scotland and a White Rod who sat in the House of Commons of Great Britain between 1774 and 1791.

== Birth ==
Archibald was baptized 24 August 1739 at Inveraray, Scotland. He was the second son of James Campbell (1706–1760) 3rd of Tuerechan (8th Chief of Tearlach, descended from Clan Campbell of Craignish), Commissary of the Western Isles of Scotland, and Elizabeth (died 1790), daughter of James Fisher, Provost of Inveraray. He grew up with his family at Dunderave Castle, and enjoyed the patronage of both Archibald Campbell, 3rd Duke of Argyll and Henry Dundas, 1st Viscount Melville.

== Early career ==
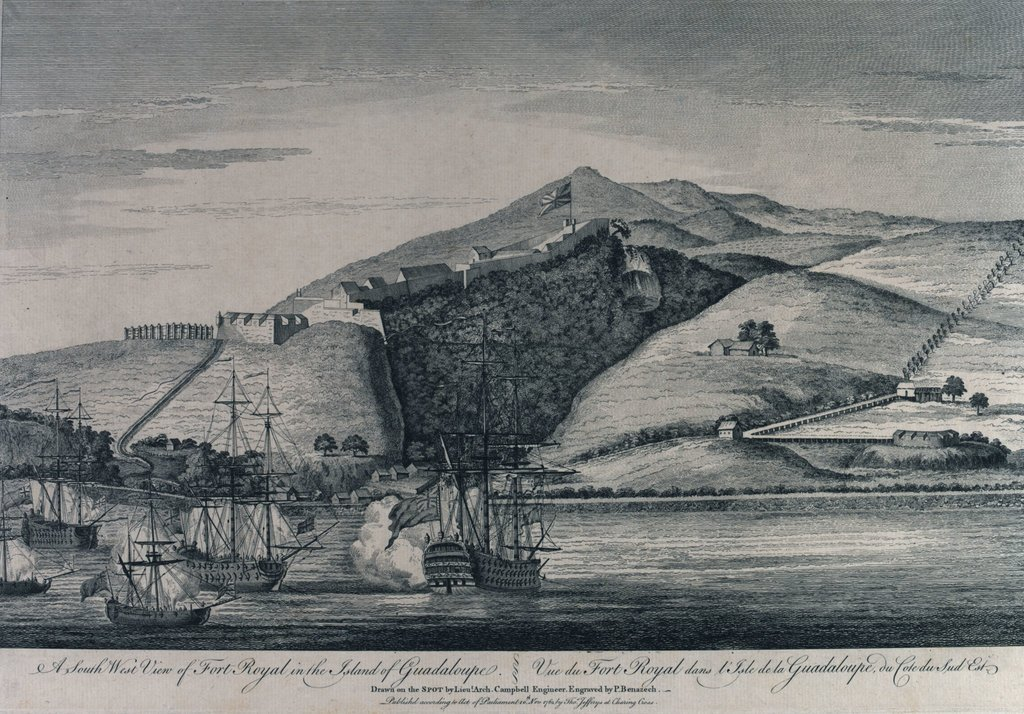
A south west View of Fort Royal in the Island of Guadaloupe, circa 1759 as sketched by Campbell

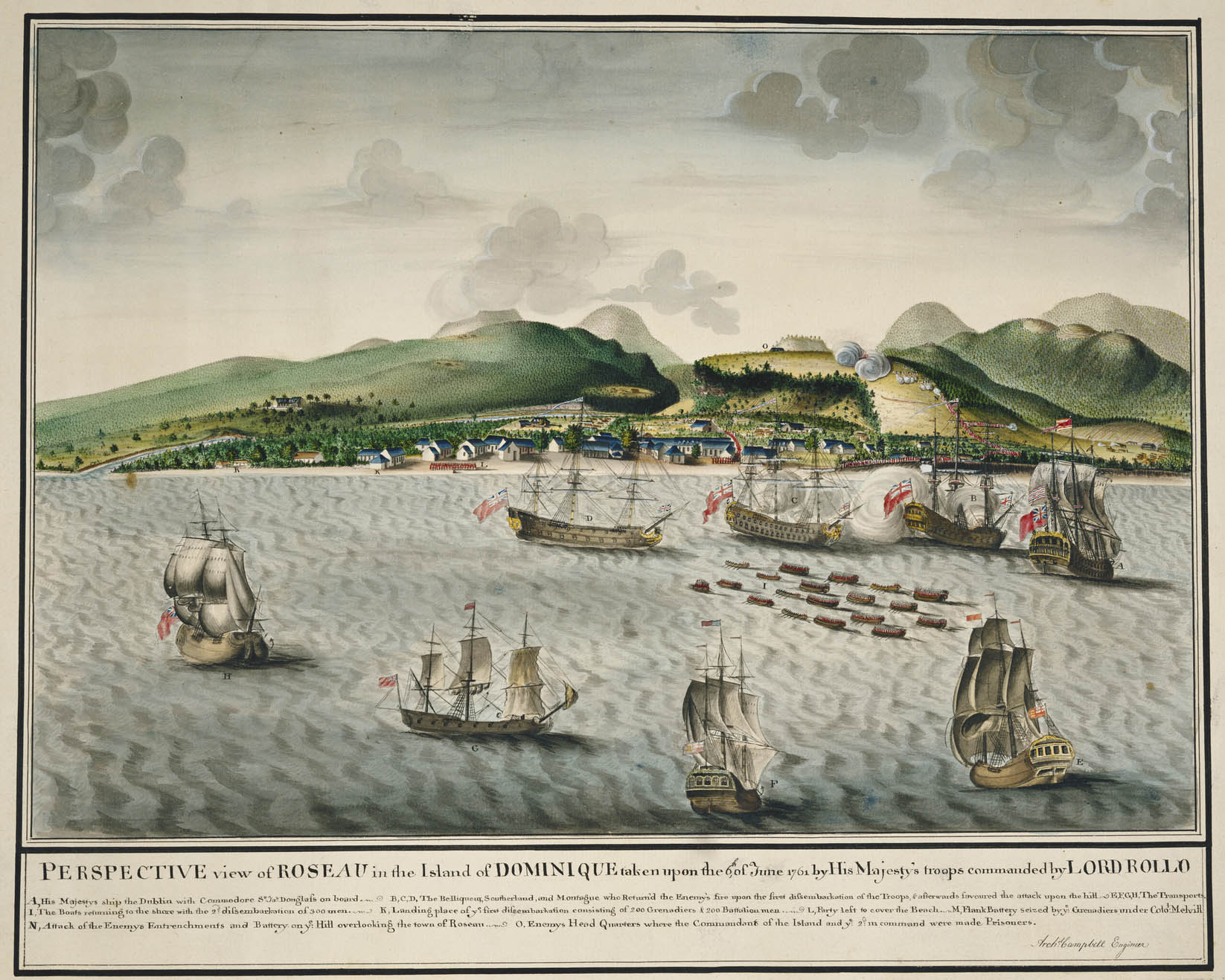
Campbell's sketch of Lord Rollo's expedition to Dominica in 1761

Educated at Glasgow University, and afterwards at the Royal Military Academy, Woolwich. In 1758, he was commissioned into the Royal Engineers. He served with them in the Seven Years' War and was wounded at the Siege of Quebec. He participated in a number of raids along the coast of France, as well as in expeditions in the West Indies. A decade later, in 1768, Colonel Campbell, was made chief engineer of the British East India Company at Bengal, and was successfully employed by the company to head the works on Fort William in Calcutta.

In Calcutta, Campbell laid the foundation of his wealth. With Captain Henry Watson, he privately invested in a dockyard at Kidderpore, and the two men acted as contractors for building and repairing ships until the government bought their concern. He also made a fortune trading in silk. Campbell used his wealth to become a major landowner in his native Argyll. He spent over £30,000 purchasing the estates of the Island of Danna, Inverneill, Knap, Taynish, and Ulva. He also purchased the houses of Inverkeithing and Queensferry.

In 1774, after an unusually bitter electoral battle with Colonel James Masterton (1715–1777), of Newton, Colonel Archibald Campbell (now styled 'of Inverneill') became the Member of Parliament for the Stirling Burghs, aided by his guardian, Viscount Melville. James Boswell acted as Campbell's legal advisor.

== Capture in America ==
Following his exciting electoral victory, Colonel Campbell left his elder brother, Sir James Campbell (1737–1805) of Killean, to keep his parliamentary seat warm and sailed for America in command of the 71st Regiment of Foot, Fraser's Highlanders, where the American Revolutionary War was in progress. In 1776, after a battle aboard a vessel in Boston Harbor, Campbell was captured by the Americans and held prisoner until 1778.

Campbell's capture coincided with the British capture of the American military officers Ethan Allen and General Charles Lee. Rumours spread among the Americans that Allen and Lee were being mistreated in British captivity, which led Campbell's American captors to torment him. In February 1777, from Concord Jail, an outraged Campbell complained to Viscount Howe of his situation. There then ensued complaints and correspondence between Howe and George Washington on Campbell's behalf.

By the following month Washington intervened and Congress protested that it had not intended to cause undue suffering to Campbell. By May, Campbell was living at the jailer's tavern, a marked improvement to his previous solitary confinement. Soon afterwards he was granted total freedom within the confine of the town of Concord, and during these years as a prisoner of war he was able to purchase the Knap estate back in Argyll. On 6 May 1778, he was finally released in exchange for Ethan Allen.

== Battle of Savannah and Governor of Georgia ==
Six months after his release, Campbell was ordered to lead 3,000 men from New York to Georgia, and in late December his army won the Battle of Savannah, followed by another victory at Augusta. Contemporaries on both sides paid tribute to the humanity and restraint shown by Campbell. The American patriot Alexander Green, one of Lee's Legion and aide-de-camp to Major General Nathanael Greene referred to Campbell's concern for the civil population and lack of bitterness towards his former captors. He also revealed how the Patriots feared Campbell as a commander of great ability. Greene related of Campbell:

As conqueror of Savannah, his immediate care was to soften the asperities of war, and to reconcile to his equitable government, those who had submitted, in the first instance, to the superiority of his arms. Though but lately released from close and rigorous confinement, which he had suffered in consequence of indignities offered to General Charles Lee, a prisoner at New York, he harboured no resentments, and considered his sufferings rather the effect of necessity, than wilful persecution. Oppression was foreign to his nature, and incompatible with his practice. He made proper allowance for an attachment to cherished principles nor with-held his applause from those who bravely supported them. He used no threats to gain proselytes, no artifice to ensnare them. Such of the inhabitants as voluntarily made a tender of service, were favourably received; but he was ever disinclined to invite them to take up arms in the British cause, lest in the fluctuating councils of his governments, he should lead them to destruction. He had too frequently seen them lavished of professions of permanent support, leaving their deluded adherents to the mercy of the government, which, in an evil hour, they had abandoned. The friends of our independence had everything to dread from his wisdom and humanity, but their alarm was short of duration. Lieutenant Colonel Campbell had too nice a sense of honour to be made instrument of injustice and oppression, and he was speedily called upon to relinquish his command, to a superior, less scrupulous and better disposed to second the harsh measures of the Commander in Chief.

He became provisional governor of Georgia then and named Jacques Marcus Prevost his lieutenant and successor before returning to England.

== Marriage ==
Returning to Britain, in July 1779, he married Amelia (1755–1813), daughter of Allan Ramsay of Kinkell, Principal Painter in Ordinary to George III. Amelia Campbell's mother, Margaret (1726–1782), was the eldest daughter of Sir Alexander Lindsay of Evelick and Hon. Amelia Murray, the sister of Amelia Campbell's influential great uncle and guardian, William Murray, 1st Earl of Mansfield. Mrs Campbell was the niece of Admiral Sir John Lindsay, and by him a first cousin of Dido Elizabeth Belle.

== Governor of Jamaica ==
He ended the American Revolution as lieutenant governor and major general in Jamaica (1779–81). At a time of great importance, Campbell (now a major general) was appointed governor of Jamaica in 1781. The British forces in America were faring ill: France joined the war on the American side and began attacking the British West Indies (capturing Tobago, St. Eustatius, St. Kitts, Nevis and Montserrat). Campbell was successful in raising Black troops and was vigilant enough that the French did not dare attack Jamaica without re-inforcements.

At the same time, Campbell assisted the British troops in America by sending information, re-inforcements and supplies. By lending some of his troops to serve as marines, he materially aided Admiral Rodney in his great victory over François Joseph Paul de Grasse at the Battle of the Saintes, saving Jamaica from a French invasion.

Campbell's wife, Amelia, and her sister, joined him in Jamaica. Their convoy from England came under fire from a joint French and Spanish fleet, and their ship was the only one to get through.

On returning from Jamaica, Campbell was awarded as Knight of the Order of the Bath.

== Governor of Madras ==
In India, Madras was exhausted after the war against Mysore, and no serious military operations were undertaken until renewed hostilities against that state became inevitable at the end of 1789. In 1786, Campbell, who was now a well known and highly respected figure, was appointed commander-in-chief and governor of Madras. Throughout his term of office, the country had a rest from the devastating wars, and so he devoted himself to the development of peaceful institutions.

He founded a military board which absorbed the duties of the Committee of Works; a hospital board, a board of revenue and a board of trade. He reorganized the police, established a stock exchange and a bank. He built an astronomical observatory and constituted an orphanage. In fact, there was hardly a department of the civil administration in which he did not labour to secure improvement and order. Madras sustained a serious loss when, overcome by illness, he was forced to leave India in February 1789, retiring from the post of governor in 1790.

== Final years ==
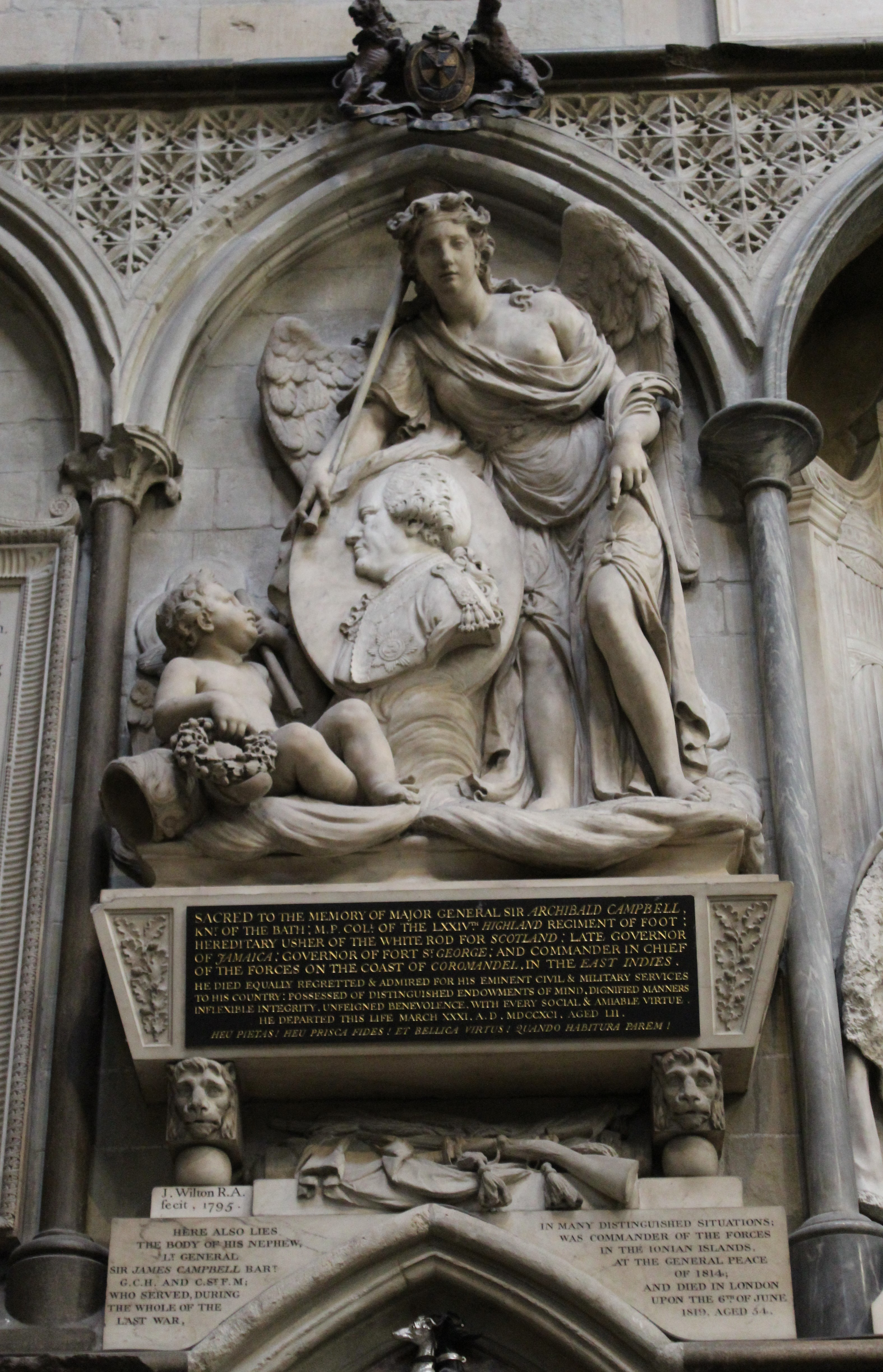
Archibald Campbell memorial, Westminster Abbey

On returning home, Campbell acquired the office of Usher of the White Rod. The Institution of Royal Engineers described Campbell as "the most brilliant of the engineers who served in India during the eighteenth century". Following a cold caught coming up from Scotland, he died the following year, 31 March 1791, at his newly purchased London home on Upper Grosvenor Street, bought from the Duke of Montrose. He was only fifty-one. His fortune, land and political titles passed to his two brothers, and his wife was given £25,000.

Campbell and his wife died without children, and they were both buried at Westminster Abbey next to Handel's Monument in Poets' Corner. A memorial by the sculptor Joseph Wilton was erected in the Abbey in 1795. Also buried in the Abbey are his nephew, Lt.-General Sir James Campbell of Inverneill and his wife's kinsmen, the Earl of Mansfield and Admiral Lindsay.

== Images ==
He sat for thirteen sittings from January to May 1790 for a portrait by artist George Romney. Romney produced several versions of the final portrait; the principal one was bought for 70 guineas by Lady Campbell from Romney via a forwarding agent in 1791, which is now owned by the National Army Museum in London (FDA-1970-12-13) – it was until December 2008 on display as part of its permanent display on the American Revolutionary War. Three other copies are attested, one of which is now displayed in the National Gallery of Art, Washington.

== See also ==
- Carter-Campbell of Possil
- Campbell of Craignish
- Inverneill House

Parliament of Great Britain
Preceded by James Masterton	Member of Parliament for Stirling Burghs; 1774–1780	Succeeded by James Campbell
Preceded by James Campbell	Member of Parliament for Stirling Burghs; 1789–1791	Succeeded by Andrew Cochrane-Johnstone
Government offices
Preceded by John Dalling	Governor of Jamaica; 1781–1784	Succeeded by Alured Clarke
Preceded by George Macartney	Governor of Madras; 1786–1789	Succeeded by William Medows
Military offices
New regiment	Colonel of the 74th (Highland) Regiment of Foot; 1787–1791	Succeeded by Charles O'Hara
