= List of Scottish Gaelic surnames =

This list of Scottish Gaelic surnames shows Scottish Gaelic surnames beside their English language equivalent.

- Unlike English surnames (but in the same way as Slavic, Lithuanian and Latvian surnames), all of these have male and female forms depending on the bearer, e.g. all Mac- names become Nic- if the person is female.
- Some of the Scottish Gaelic surnames are Gaelicised forms of English surnames; and conversely, some of the English surnames are Anglicised forms of the Gaelic surnames.
- In some cases the Gaelic and English names do not share an etymological origin.
- Several surnames have multiple spellings; this is sometimes due to unrelated families bearing the same surname.
- A single surname in either language may have multiple translations in the other.
- In some English translations of the names, the M(a)c- prefix may be omitted in the English, e.g. Bain vs MacBain, Cowan vs MacCowan, Ritchie vs MacRitchie. Also, the prefixes Mac- and Mc- are interchangeable, although individuals may have a preference as to which form is used in their own surname.

== Surname list ==
Note that certain names may appear multiple times on this list; use the 'find' or 'search' function in your web browser to quickly look up certain names.

=== A-C ===
Scottish Gaelic surname	English surname	Notes	Ref (Note: Footnotes which appear in this column denote that the first two columns (not the "Notes" column) is sourced from the cited reference.)
Aileanach	Allan, Allanach, MacCallan	Allanach in Wester Ross.	
Ailpeanach	MacAlpine		
Allanach	Allan, Allanach, MacCallan	Allanach in Wester Ross.	
Ambarsan	Anderson	In Sleat.	
Anam	Annan		
Andarsan	Anderson		
Anndrasdan	Anderson		
Arasgain	Erskine	"Arascain" in old orthography.	
Ariss	Aris; Ariss Bànach	Robin; Bain	Member Clan John Aris; In Wester Ross.
Baran	Barron		
Barrach	Dunbar		
Beitean	Beaton, Bethune	In Ross.	
Bhàsa	Vass		
Bhodhsa	Vass		
Blacach	Black		
Blàr	Blair		
Blàrach	Blair, Muir		
Bochanan	Buchanan		
Boid, Bòid	Boyd		
Bòideach	Boyd		
Bràigheach	MacGillivray		
Breac	Breck		
Breathnach	Galbraith, Walsh, Welsh		
Brothaigh	Brodie		
Bruis	Bruce		
Brùn	Broun, Brown	On Tiree.	
Brus	Bruce		
Buideach	Budge		
Buidheach	Bowie, Buie		
Builds	Budge		
Buiseid	Bisset		
Cailbhin	Calvin		
Caileanach	Callanach, MacCallan		
Caimbeul	Campbell		
Caimbeulach	Campbell		
Camran	Cameron		
Camshron	Cameron		
Camshronach	Cameron		
Cananach	Buchanan		
Canonach	Buchanan, MacPherson	MacPherson in Skye.	
Caoidheach	Kay, MacKay		
Caolaisdean	Kelso	On Arran.	
Catach	Catach, Catto		
Catan	Cattenach		
Catanach	Cattenach	Also a member of Clan Chattan.	
Ceallach	Kelly		
Ceanadach	Kennedy		
Ceannaideach	Kennedy		
Cearrach	Kerr	On Arran.	
Ceiteach	Keith		
Ciar	Keir		
Ciarach	Keir		
Ciogach	Eggo	In Aberdeenshire.	
Coineagan	Cunningham		
Crannach	Cranna	In Aberdeenshire.	
Criatharach	Crerar	In Loch Tay and Strathspey.	
Cuimeanach	Comyn, Cumming		
Cuimein	Comyn, Cumming		
Cuimeineach	Comyn, Cumming		
Càidh	Caie, Kay, Keith	Keith in Caithness.	
Cèamp	Kemp	In Wester Ross.	
Cèampach	Kemp	In Wester Ross.	
Còmhan	Cowan, MacCowan		
Creag, Creagach	Craig		

=== D-L ===
Scottish Gaelic	English	Notes	Ref
Dalais	Dallas		
Deòir	Dewar		
Deòireach	Dewar		
Dòmhnallach, Dòmhnullach	MacDonald		
Druimeanach	Drummond		
Druimein	Drummond		
Druimeineach	Drummond		
Druiminn	Drummond		
Dubh	Dow, Black		
Dubhach	MacDuff		
Dùbhghlas	Douglas		
Dùghallach	Coull, Dowell, MacDougall, MacDowall		
Dùghlas	Douglas		
Dùghlasach	Douglas		
Dunaid	Dunnet		
Dunaidh	Downie		
Donnchadh	Duncan		
Eabarcrombaigh	Abercrombie		
Fearghasdan	Ferguson		
Fionnlasdan	Finlayson		
Flimean	Fleming		
Foirbeis	Forbes		
Foirbeiseach	Forbes		
Flachnàn	Flanagan	In Ayrshire.	
Fòlais	Foulis, Fowlis		
Friseal	Fraser, Frazer		
Frisealach	Fraser, Frazer		
Gall	Gall		
Gallach	Gall, Gallie, Gollach		
Geadais	Geddes		
Geadasach	Geddes		
Gearailteach	Fitzgerald		
Gilios	Gillies		
GillAndrais	Gillanders		
GillEasbaig	Archbold, Archibald, Bishop, Gillespie		
GillEasbuig	Gillespie, Archibald		
GilleChriosd	Gilchrist, Christie		
GilleChrìost	Gilchrist, Christie		
Gill'Iosa	Gillies		
Giobsan	Gibson		
Glas	Glass, Gray		
Gobha	Gow, Smith		
Grannd	Grant		
Grannda	Grant		
Granndach	Grant		
Greum	Graeme, Graham		
Greumach	Graeme, Graham		
Griogal	MacGregor, McGregor, Gregory	In Wester Ross.	
Griogalach	MacGregor, McGregor, Gregory	In Wester Ross.	
Griogarach	Gregg, Greig, Greer, Grierson, MacGregor, Gregory		
Guaire	Noble		
Guinne	Gunn		
Gunnach	Gunn		
Gutraidh	Guthrie		
Gòrdan	Gordon		
Gòrdanach	Gordon	Hoovín	
Ìomharach	Iverach, Ivory		
Latharnach	Larnach		
Lathurna	Lorne		
Leamhanach	Lennox		
Leamhnach	Lennox		
Leòideach	Cloud, MacLeod		
Lobhdain	Lothian	In Glen Lyon.	
Loganach	Logan		
Loudain	Lothian	In Glen Lyon.	
Lìos	Lees	On Arran.	
Lìosach	Gillies, Lees	Also used for someone from Lismore.	
Lùtair	Luther		

=== Mac- ===
Mac- (son of) is by far the most common element in Scottish Gaelic surnames.

Scottish Gaelic	English	Notes	Ref
Mac a' Bhacstair, Mac a' Bhacastair	Baker, Baxter, MacVaxter		
Mac a' Bhàird	Baird, Ward		
Mac a' Bhàirling	MacFarlane		
Mac a' Bharain	Barron, Warren		
Mac a' Bhiataich	MacCavity, MacVitie		
Mac a' Bhiocair	MacVicar		
Mac a' Bhreatannaich	Braithnoch, Bratney, Bratnie, Bretnoch, Calbraith, Galbraith, MacBratney		
Mac a' Bhreatnaich	Galbraith, Bratney, Cretney		
Mac a' Bhruthainn	MacBrayne, Brown	Brown in Argyll.	
Mac a' Chananaich	Buchanan		
Mac a' Charraige	Craig	On Arran.	
Mac a' Chléirich	Clark etc., MacClery, MacLerie, Clerie	Clerie in Glasgow.	
Mac a' Chombaich	Colquhoun, MacCombie		
Mac a' Chriathrair	Crerar	In Loch Tay and Strathspey.	
Mac a' Chrosain	MacCrossan		
Mac a' Chruiteir	Harper, MacWhirter	Harper in Stewartry.	
Mac a' Ghniomhaid	Agnew		
Mac a' Ghobhainn	MacGavin, MacGowan, Smith, Gow	MacGavin in Glasgow and Moray.	
Mac a' Ghoill	Gall, MacGill	MacGill on Jura.	
Mac a' Ghreidheir	Grieve, Grierson		
Mac a' Ghreusaiche	Grassick, Grassie, Soutar		
Mac a' Ghrùdair	Brewster, Gruer, MacGruer, MacGruther, Magruder		
Mac a' Leòra	MacClure, MacLure		
Mac a' Lìos	Lees, MacLeish		
Mac a' Mhaighstir	MacMaster		
Mac a' Mhaoilein	MacMillan, MacWhillan, Quillan		
Mac a' Mhaoir	Mair, Weir	Weir in Dunbartonshire.	
Mac a' Mhiadhaich	May, Omay, Omey	Omey in Lorne.	
Mac a' Mhuilleir	Millar, Milne		
Mac a' Phearsain	MacPherson		
Mac a' Phì	Fee, MacFee, MacPhee, MacCaffey		
Mac an Aba	Abbot, Abbotson, Macnab		
Mac an Airgid	Sillars	On Arran.	
Mac an Deòir	Dewar, Macindeoir		
Mac an Deòraidh	Major, Jorie, MacJarrow	Jorie in Galloway.	
Mac an Dorsair	Dorward, Durward		
Mac an Duibh	Macindoe	Mac an Duibh is short for Mac Iain Duibh.	
Mac an Fhigheadair	MacNider		
Mac an Fhilidh	MacNeillie, Neil	Neil in Galloway.	
Mac an Fhleisteir	Fletcher, Leslie		
Mac an Fhoirbhich	Munro	In Inveraray.	
Mac an Fhùcadair	MacKnockater, MacNucator, Walker		
Mac an Fhuibhir	MacNair, Weir	In Argyll.	
Mac an Iasgair	Fisher, MacInesker.		
Mac an Lamhaich, Mac an Làmhaich	Lennie		
Mac an Leighe	MacLeay	In Wester Ross.	
Mac an Lèigh	Beaton, Livingston, Livingstone, MacLeay	Beaton on Islay Livingston in Appin. MacLeay on Lewis. Livingston and Livingstone are etymologically unrelated to Mac an Lèigh.	
Mac an Luaimh	Mulloy		
Mac an Oighre	MacNair	In Perthshire.	
Mac an Ollaimh	MacInally, MacNally	In Dunbartonshire.	
Mac an Rìgh	MacNee, King		
Mac an Rothaich	Munro		
Mac an Ruaidh	Macanroy, Macinroy, Roy	Mac an Ruaidh equates to Mac Iain Ruaidh.	
Mac an Sporain	MacSporran, Purser, Purcell	Purser in Argyll.	
Mac an Tàilleir	Taylor		
Mac an Tòisich	Mackintosh, Macintosh, Tosh		
Mac an t-Sagairt	MacTaggart, Taggart		
Mac an t-Saoir	Macintyre, MacTear, Tyre, Wright		
Mac an t-Sealgair	Hunter		
Mac an t-Srònaich	Stronach		
Mac an Tuairneir	Turner		
Mac an Uidhir	MacNair Weir	In the Lennox. Mac an Uidhir equates to Mac Iain Uidhir.	
Mac Iain Bhallaich	Malloch		
Mac Iain Duibh	MacIndoe		
Mac Iain Ruaidh	MacInroy, MacAnroy		
Mac Iain Uidhir	MacNair	In Glengarry.	
Mac na Carraige	Craig		
Mac na Ceàrda	Caird, Sinclair		
Mac na Ceàrdaich	Caird, Sinclair		
Mac na Maoile	MacMillan	In Perthshire.	
Mac O' Dreain	Drain	In Kintyre.	
Mac O' Seannaig	Shannon	On Arran.	
Mac'Ill'Anndrais	Anderson, MacAndrew, Gillanders		
Mac'IlleBhreac	Breck		
Mac'Ill'Eathainn	MacLean		
Mac'Ill'Fhinnein	MacLennan		
Mac'Ill'Fhinntain	Clinton, MacLinton		
Mac'Ill'Fhionndaig	MacClintock		
Mac'IllÌosa	Gillies, MacLeish		
Mac'IllÒig	Ogg, Young		
Mac'Ille na Brataich	Bannerman		
Mac'IlleBhàin	Bain, Micklewain, Milwain, Whyte		
Mac'IlleBhuidh	Bowie, Buie, Ogilvy		
Mac'IlleChiar	Kerr, Keir		
Mac'IlleDhuibh	Black, Blackie, Dow		
Mac'IlleMhìcheil	Carmichael, Gilmichael		
Mac'IlleMhòire	Gilmour, Gilmore		
Mac'IlleNaoimh	MacNiven		
Mac'IlleRiabhaich	Darach, Darroch etc., Reoch, Revie, Riach		
Mac'IlleRuaidh	Gilroy, MacIroy, Reid, Roy		
MacUirigh	Currie		
MacAbhra	MacAra, McAra		
MacAbhsalain	Causland, MacAuslan		
MacAdaidh, MacÀdaidh	MacAdie, MacCadie, Munro	Munro in Easter Ross; Dwelly says Munro, "in certain families only".	
MacAdhaimh, MacÀdhaimh	Adam, Adamson, MacAdam, MacCaw, MacKeggie		
MacÀidh	Mackay		
MacAididh	MacAdie	Also Ferguson of Balmacruchie.	
MacAilein	Allan, Allanson, Callan, MacAllan		
MacAilpein	Alpine, MacAlpine		
MacAlasdair	Alexander, MacAlister, MacAllister, MacAndie, McElshender		
MacAmbrais	Cambridge, Chambers, MacCambridge	Chambers in Argyll.	
MacAmhalghaidh	Cowley, MacAulay, Oliver	In Dunbartonshire.	
MacAmhlaidh	MacAulay		
MacAmhlaigh	Cowley, MacAulay	In the Hebrides.	
MacAnndaidh	Andie, MacAndie	MacAndie on Berneray, North Uist.	
MacAnndra	Anderson, Andrew, MacAndrew		
MacAnndrais	Anderson, Andrew, MacAndrew		
MacAodhagain	MacKeegan		
MacAoidh	Kay, MacGhie, MacHeth, Mackay, MacHugh, MacKee, MacKie	MacGhie in Galloway. MacHeth in Moray.	
MacAoidhein	MacQuien		
MacAomalain	Bannatyne		
MacAonghais	Angus, Canch, MacAinsh, MacCance, MacInnes, Innes		
MacAra	MacAra		
MacArtain	MacArthur, MacCartney	MacArthur on Skye.	
MacArtair	Arthur, McCarter, Carter, MacArthur	Carter in Perthshire.	
MacAsgaidh	Caskie, MacCaskie		
MacAsgaill	MacAskill		
MacAsgain	MacAskin		
MacBeatha	Beaton, Bethune, MacBeath, MacBeth, MacBey		
MacBeathag	MacBeth	In Wester Ross.	
MacBhàididh	MacWattie, Watson, Watt		
MacBharrais	MacVarish		
MacBhàtair	MacWalter, Qualtrough, Watson, Watt, Watters		
MacBheatha	MacBeth, MacVeigh, MacVey, Beith		
MacBheathaig	MacBeth, MacBethock	In Wester Ross.	
MacBheathain	MacBain, MacBean, MacVean		
MacBhigein	MacFigan, Little		
MacBhiocair	MacVicar		
MacBhlàthain	Blain, Blane		
MacBhradain	Braden, Salmon(d)		
MacBhraonaigh	Burnie		
MacBhrìghdein	Bryden, MacBridan	On Arran.	
MacCàba	MacCabe		
MacCaibe	MacCabe		
MacCailein	Colinson, Cullen, MacCallan		
MacCain	MacCann, MacCain, MacKean		
MacCaisgein	MacAskin		
MacCalmain	MacCalman, Murchison	Murchison in Ross-shire.	
MacCaluim	MacCallum, Malcolm(son)		
MacCaog	MacCaig		
MacCaoig	Caig, MacCaig		
MacCardaidh	Hardie, MacHardie, MacHardy	Hardie in Braemar.	
MacCarmaig	Cormack, MacCormick		
MacCathachaidh	MacCarthy		
MacCathail	Cail, MacAll, MacCail, MacCall, MacKail		
MacCathbhaidh	MacCaffie, MacHaffie, Mahaffie		
MacCathain	MacCann, MacKean, MacCain		
MacCathasaigh	Cassie		
MacCathbharra	MacAffer, MacCaffer		
MacCeallaig	MacKellaig		
MacCeallaigh	Kelly		
MacCeallair	MacKellar		
MacCearnaigh	Cairnie		
MacCearraich	MacKerrow		
MacCeasain	Kesson		
MacChoinnich	MacKenzie	On Lewis.	
MacCianain	Keenan		
MacCiarain	MacKerron		
MacCiomalain	Bannatyne		
MacCionadha	MacKenna, MacKinnie	In Galloway.	
MacCinidh	MacKenna, MacKinnie		
MacClambroch	Landsburgh	In Galloway.	
MacCnaimhin	MacNevin		
MacCnusachainn	Kennedy	On Arran.	
MacCodrum	MacCodrum		
MacCoinnich	Kynoch, Mackenzie, MacKinnie		
MacCoinnigh	MacWhinnie	In Galloway.	
MacColla	MacColl		
MacComhainn	Cowan, MacCowan		
MacConaill	MacConnell, MacWhannell		
MacConnain	Connon	In Aberdeenshire.	
MacCosgraigh	MacCoskrie		
MacCorcadail	MacCorquodale		
MacCormaig	MacCormack, MacCormick		
MacCrain	MacCrain, Crane	On Jura.	
MacCreamhain	Crawford, Crawfurd		
MacCriomain	Grimond, MacCrimmon		
MacCrithein	MacNiven	In Argyll.	
MacCrosain	Crossan, MacCrossan		
MacCruimein	Grimmond, MacCrimmon	Grimmond in Perthshire.	
MacCrìsdein	Christie, Chrystal, MacCrystal		
MacCròin	MacCrone	In Argyll.	
MacCuaig	Cook, MacCuaig	Cook on Islay.	
MacCuidhein	MacDonald	In Wester Ross.	
MacCuilcein	MacQuilken, Wilkins, Wilkinson	Wilkins in Argyll. Wilkinson in Perthshire.	
MacCuinn	Conn, MacQueen, Quinn	Conn in Aberdeenshire. MacQueen in Galloway.	
MacCuinnleis	Candlish, Chandlish, MacCandlish		
MacCuirc	MacGurk, Quirk		
MacCuithein	MacDonald, MacQueen, MacQuien	MacDonald in Trotternish. MacQueen and MacQuien in the north.	
MacCullach	MacCulloch	MacCulloch can also be represented by MacLulaich.	
MacCullaich	MacCulloch	In Galloway.	
MacCumasgaigh	Comiskey		
MacCumhais	MacCuish		
MacCuthais	MacCuidh		
MacCòiseam	MacCoshin, MacDonald	MacDonald in Dunvegan.	
MacCòmhain	Cowan, MacCowan		
MacCòmhghan	MacCowan	MacCòmhghan, MacEoghain and MacGobhainn are etymologically unrelated but often result in similar variants.	
MacCùga	Cook	On Arran.	
MacDheòrsa	MacGeorge, Major		
MacDhiarmaid	MacDermid, MacDiarmid, Campbell		
MacDhonnchaidh	Duncan, MacConnachie, Robertson	Robertson on the mainland. Robertson is etymologically unrelated to MacDhonnchaidh.	
MacDhrostain	MacRostie	In Perthshire.	
MacDhubhaich	MacDuff Duffy, MacDuthy		
MacDhubhaig	MacCuaig		
MacDhubhShìth	Duffy, Fee, MacDuffie, MacFee, McPhee.		
MacDhubhthaich	MacDuff, Duffy, MacDuthy		
MacDhuibh	MacDuff, MacDui		
MacDhunlèibhe	Livingstone	Livingstone is etymologically unrelated to MacDhunlèibhe.	
MacDiarmaid	MacDermid, Campbell		
MacDhàibhidh	Davie, Davidson, Day, Deason	Day in Banffshire. Deason in Moray.	
MacDhòmhnaill	Donald, Donaldson, MacConnell, MacDonald, MacDonnell		
MacDhùghaill	Coles, Coull, Dowall, MacDougall, MacDowell	Coles in Galloway.	
MacDhùnShléibhe	Livingston, MacLeay	On Islay.	
MacEachaidh	McGeachie, MacGeachie, McGeachy, MacGeachy	in Kintyre.	
MacEachainn	MacEachen, MacGeachen, McGeechan		
MacEachairn	MacEachern, MacKechnie		
MacEacharna	Cochrane, MacEachern, MacKechnie	Cochrane in Argyll.	
MacEalair	MacKellar, Quiller		
MacEalar	Mackellar, Quiller		
MacEamailinn	Bannatyne		
MacEanain	MacKinnon	On Arran and Kintyre.	
MacEanraig, MacEanraig	Henderson, Hendry, Kendry, Hendrick, Henry, McHenry, Kendrick, MacKendrick		
MacEòghainn	MacEwan, MacEwen, McEwing, McOwen, McCowan, McKeown, McCune, McEuen, McEown, McCowne, McKown, McCown, sometimes McGowan variants are derived from MacEoghain rather than MacGobhain.		
MacFhearchair	Carrocher, Farquhar, Farquharson, Kerracher, MacErchar, MacFarquhar, MacKerracher, Mackerchar		
MacFhearghail	MacKerral		
MacFhearghais	Fergus, Ferguson, Fergusson, Ferries, MacFerries, MacKerras, MacKerruish	MacFerries in Braemar.	
MacFhilib	MacGilp, MacKillop, Philp		
MacFhiongain	MacKinnon		
MacFhionghain, MacFhionghuin	MacKinnon		
MacFhionnlaigh	Findlay, Finlayson, Macinlay, MacIntosh, Mackinlay	MacIntosh in Glen Shee.	
MacFhitheachain	MacIchan, Mackichan		
MacFhlaithbheartaich	MacLafferty, MacLarty, MacLaverty		
MacFhraing	Rankin		
MacFhraingein	MacCracken, Rankin		
MacFigeinn	Little, Littleson, MacFigan	Littleson in Kintyre.	
MacFrìdeinn	Brydan, MacBridan	On Arran.	
MacFuirigh	MacVurich	On Arran.	
MacGairbheith	Garvie, Jarvie, MacGarva, MacGarvie		
MacGaradh	Hay, MacGarrie		
MacGhearailt	Fitzgerald		
MacGill-Eain	MacLean		
MacGhille	MacGill		
MacGill'Earnain	MacLearnan		
MacGill'Easbaig	Archbold, Archibald, Bishop, Gillespie		
MacGill'Eòin	Meiklejohn		
MacGill'Fhaolagain	MacKilligan		
MacGill'Fhiontag	MacLintock		
MacGill'Oig	Ogg, Young		
MacGill'Onaidh	MacGillony		
MacGille	MacGillivray	In Wester Ross.	
MacGilleBhàin	Bain, Bayne, MacBain, Micklewain, Milvain, Wayne, Whyte		
MacGilleBhràth	MacGillivray		
MacGilleBhreac	Breck		
MacGilleBhrìghde	Gibb, Gibson, Gilbert, Gilbride, MacBryde		
MacGilleChaluim	MacLeod	In Raasay,	
MacGilleChrìosd	MacGilchrist, Christie		
MacGilleDhonaghart	MacDonald	In Benderloch.	
MacGilleathain	Clean, Gellion, Gilzean, Lane, MacLaine, MacLean		
MacGilleDhuibh	Black, Blackie		
MacGilleFhialain	MacLellan	On North Uist.	
MacGilleGhlais	Glass, Gray		
MacGillIosa	Gillies, MacLeish		
MacGilleMhartainn	Gilmartin		
MacGilleRiabhaich	Darroch, MacIlwraith, Reoch, Revie, Riach	Revie in Kintyre.	
MacGilleSeathanaich	Shaw		
MacGiobain	Cubbin, MacGibbon, Gibson		
MacGlaisein	Glashan, MacGlashan		
MacGoraidh	Gorrie, MacGorrie, Godfrey, Jeffrey(s)		
MacGobhainn	MacGowan, Smith	MacCowan can also be represented by MacCòmhghan or MacEoghain (MacGobhainn, MacEoghain and MacCòmhghan are etymologically different).	
MacGoraidh	Gorrie, MacGorrie, Godfrey, Jeffrey(s)		
MacGriogair	Gregory, Grigor, MacGregor, Greig, Gregg, Grierson	Gregory in Perthshire.	
MacGuaire	Curry, MacGuire, MacQuarrie, Noble	Curry is sometimes etymologically unrelated to MacGuaire.	
MacGumaraid	Montgomery	Dwelly lists "MacGumerait".	
MacIain	Johnson, Johnston, Kean, MacIan, MacKean, MacDonald	MacDonald in Glencoe	
MacIllAnndrais	Anderson, Gillanders, MacAndrew		
MacIllAodhagain	MacLagan		
MacIllDheòra	MacClure, MacLure		
MacIllEarnain	MacLearnan		
MacIllEasbaig	Archibald, Gillespie		
MacIllEathain	Clean, Gellion, Gilzean, Lane, MacLaine, MacLean	Clean in Galloway	
MacIlleBhàin	Bain, Bayne, MacBain, Micklewain, Milvain, Whyte		
MacIlleBheathain	MacIlvain, MacIlwaine, Wayne		
MacIlleBhlàthain	Blain, Blane, MacBlane	MacBlane in Galloway.	
MacIlleBhràth	MacGillivray		
MacIlleBhrìghde	Gibb, Gilbert, Gilbride, MacBryde		
MacIlleBhris	MacElfrish		
MacIlleBhuidhe	Bowie, Buie, Ogilvie		
MacIlleChaluim	MacCallum, Malcolm(son)		
MacIlleChatain	Hatton	In Kintyre.	
MacIlleChathbhaidh	MacCaffie, MacHaffie, Mahaffie		
MacIlleChiar	Keir, Kerr		
MacIlleChiarain	MacIlherran, MacKerron, Herron, Sharpe		
MacIlleChomhghain	Cowan, MacCowan		
MacIlleChonaill	MacWhannell		
MacIlleChrìosd	Gilchrist		
MacIlleChruim	Crum, MacCrum	In Dunbartonshire.	
MacIlleDhòmhnaich	Downie, MacIldownie		
MacIlleDhonaghart	MacDonald	In Benderloch.	
MacIlleDhubhthaich	Duthie, Maduthy		
MacIlleDhuibh	Black, Dow, Dowie, Howie, Huie	Dowie in Perthshire. Huie in Argyll.	
MacIlleDhuinn	Brown, Donn, Dunn		
MacIlleGhlais	Glass, Gray		
MacIlleGhuinnein	Winning		
MacIlleGhuirm	Blue		
MacIll'Éidich	MacLatchie, MacLetchie		
MacIll'Eòin	Meiklejohn		
MacIlleMhaoil	Bell, MacGill, MacMillan	On South Uist.	
MacIlleMhàrtainn	MacMartin, Gilmartin		
MacIlleMhearnaig	Warnock		
MacIlleMhìcheil	Carmichael, MacMichael		
MacIlleMhoire	Gilmore, Gilmour, Morrison		
MacIlleNaoimh	MacNiven		
MacIllePhàdraig	Milfrederick		
MacIllePheadair	MacFater, MacPhater, Paterson, Peters	MacFater in Kintyre.	
MacIlleRiabhaich	Darroch, MacIlwraith, Reoch, Revie, Riach	Darroch on Jura; Revie in Kintyre.	
MacIlleRuaidh	Gilroy, MacIlroy, Milroy, Reid, Roy		
MacIlleSheathain	MacCheyne, MacShane, Sheen	In Argyll.	
MacIlleSheathanaich	Shaw	On Jura.	
MacIlleSheathnaich	Shaw		
MacIlleThòmhais	Hosier, MacLehose, Mucklehose		
MacIllFhaolagain	MacKilligan		
MacIll'Fhaolain	Cleland, Gilfillan, Gilliland, MacClelland, MacLellan	MacLellan except on South Uist.	
MacIllFheargain	MacLergan	On Islay.	
MacIll'Fhialain	MacLellan	On South Uist.	
MacIll'Fhinnein	MacLennan		
MacIll'Fhionndaig	Lindsay, MacClintock, MacLintock		
MacIllFhionndain	Clinton, MacLinton		
MacIllIanain	MacLennan	In Wester Ross.	
MacIllÌmheir	MacLiver, Oliver	On Islay.	
MacIllIomchadha	MacClumpha, MacLumpha		
MacIllÌosa	Gillies, Lees, MacLeish		
MacIllOnchon	Clanachan, Clenachan, MacClanachan	Clanachan and Clenachan in Galloway.	
MacIllOnfhaidh	MacAlonie, MacGillonie		
MacIll'osa	Gillies, MacLeish		
MacIllUidhir	MacClure, MacLure	Only in Sleat.	
MacIomhair, MacÌomhair	MacIver	Also Campbell of Asknish.	
MacIonmhainn	Love, MacKinven	Love in Kintyre and Ayrshire; Dwelly said the Isle of Arran. MacKinven in Kintyre.	
MacIosaig, MacÌosaig	MacIsaac, MacKessock		
MacLabhrainn	MacLaren, MacLaurin, Lawrie		
MacLabhruinn	MacLaren, Laurie		
MacLachlainn	MacLachlan, MacLauchlan		
MacLagain	MacLagan		
MacLamraich	Landsborough	In Kintyre.	
MacLaomainn	Lamond, Lamont, MacLeman		
MacLathagain	MacLagan	In Perthshire.; Dwelly says specifically Strath Tay.	
MacLeòid	Cloud, MacLeod		
MacLeòir	MacClure, MacLure		
MacLianain	MacLennan	In Wester Ross.	
MacLothaidh	Fullarton, Fulton, MacCloy	Fullarton on the Isle of Arran.	
MacLiuthar	McLure		
MacLughaidh	Fullarton, Fulton, MacClew, MacCloy, MacCluie, MacLoy		
MacLuinge	MacClung, MacLung		
MacLuirg	MacLurg		
MacLulaich	MacCulloch, MacLullich	MacCulloch in Argyll.	
MacLùcaidh	MacLuckie	In Galloway.	
MacLùcais	Luke, MacDougall, MacLucas, MacLugash, Douglas	MacDougall on Coll.	
MacMhaighstir	MacMaster		
MacMhanachain	Monk	On Benbecula.	
MacMhannain	MacVannan		
MacMhaoilein	MacMillan		
MacMhaoirn	Mearns		
MacMhaolagain	MacMillan. Milligan, Milliken	MacMillan and Milligan in Galloway.	
MacMhaolain	MacMillan, MacMullen		
MacMhaolBheatha	MacBean	In Alvie.	
MacMhaolChaluim	Callum, Malcolm		
MacMhaolDòmhnaich	MacIldonich	In Inverness.	
MacMhaolÌosa	Mellis, Mellish, Melluish		
MacMharais	MacVarish		
MacMharcais	Marquis		
MacMhata	Mathewson, Mathieson		
MacMhatha	Matheson	In the south.	
MacMhathain	MacMann, Matheson	MacMann in Glenlivet. Matheson in the north.	
MacMhàrtainn	MacMartin, Martin		
MacMhànais	Mains, Manson, MacManus, MacVanish		
MacMhèinn	MacMinn, Menzies		
MacMhiadhchain	MacMeeken, Meechan	In Galloway	
MacMhìcheil	Carmichael, MacMichael		
MacMhoirein	MacMorran, Morran, Morrison	MacMorran in Argyll. Morrison on Islay.	
MacMhòrdha	Mair, Moore, Muir		
MacMhorgain	Morgan		
MacMhuircheartaich	MacKirdy, MacMurray (but not Murray)		
MacMhuirich	Currie, (Note: For Currie, Mark states "also MacPherson".) MacMurray, MacVurich, Murchison, Murdoch, Murray	Murray in Galloway.	
MacMhunna	Munn		
MacMhurardaich	MacCurdy	On Arran.	
MacMhurchaidh	MacMurchie, MacMurchy, MacMurdo, MacMurray, Murchie, Murchison, Murdoch, MacMorrow, Morrow, Murphy		
MacNaois	MacNeish, MacNish		
MacNaomhain	MacNiven, Niven		
MacNeacail	MacNicol Nicolson, Nicholson		
MacNeachdain	MacCracken, MacNaughton		
MacNeis	MacNeish, MacNish		
MacNèill	MacNeill, MacNeil, Nelson, Neilson		
MacNia	MacNee, MacConie		
MacNiallghais	MacNeilage		
MacNiallghuis	MacNeilage		
MacNìll	MacNeil, Neilson, Nelson	On South Uist.	
MacNiocail	MacKrycul, MacNichol, Nicolson		
MacNobaill	Noble	In Wester Ross.	
MacPhaid	Faed, MacFeat, Peat		
MacPhaidein	MacFadyen MacFadzean		
MacPhail, MacPhàil	MacFall, MacPhail, Quayle		
MacPhairce	Park	On Uist.	
MacPhàdraig	Paterson, MacPhatrick	Also Grant of Glenmoriston.	
MacPhàic	MacKillop, Park	MacKillop on Berneray, North Uist. Park on Uist.	
MacPhàidein	MacFadyen, MacFadzean		
MacPhàil	MacFall, MacPhail, Quayle		
MacPhàrlain	MacFarlane, MacPartland, MacPharlane		
MacPheadair	MacFater, MacPhater, Paterson, Peters	MacFater in Kintyre.	
MacPheadarain	MacPhedran		
MacPheadrais	MacFetridge		
MacPheidearain	Fletcher, MacPhedran	Fletcher in Glencoe.	
MacPhilip	Mackillop, Philp		
MacPhòil	Polson, MacPhail	In Gairloch.	
MacRabaidh	Crabbie, MacRobbie		
MacRaghnaill	MacCrindle, MacRaild, Randall		
MacRaibeirt	Corbett, MacRobert MacRobbie		
MacRaoimhin	MacNiven	On Arran.	
MacRaoiridh	MacCririe, MacRyrie, Ryrie		
MacRaonaill	MacRanald, Ranaldson, Randall		
MacRath	Cray, MacRae, Machray	Machray in Aberdeenshire	
MacRàild	MacRaild		
MacRiada	MacCreadie		
MacRiocaird	Crockett	In Galloway.	
MacRisnidh	MacRitchie, Ritchie, Dickson		
MacRìdeinn	Bryden, MacBridan	On Arran.	
MacRìgh	King, MacNee		
MacRob	MacRobb		
MacRobaidh	MacRobbie	In Moray.	
MacRoibeirt	Corbett, MacRobert, MacRobbie, Robertson		
MacRoithridh	MacRyrie	In Wester Ross.	
MacRuairidh	MacRory, MacRury		
MacRusachainn	Kennedy	On Arran.	
MacShanndaidh	Andie, MacAndie		
MacShealbhaigh	MacKelvie		
MacSheòrais	MacGeorge, Major		
MacSheòrsa	Cuthbertson	In Inverness.	
MacShimidh	Jamieson, Lovat, MacKimmie, Sim, Simpson		
MacShithich	Keith, Shaw, Shiach	Keith in Moray.	
MacShitrig	MacKettrick		
MacShìm	MacKim, Simpson		
MacShomhairle	MacCurley, MacSorley, Somerled, MacSomerled, Sorley		
MacShuibhne	MacQueen, MacSween	In the south.	
MacSiridh	MacKinnon, MacSherry	MacKinnon on Mull.	
MacSporain	MacSporran, Purser, Purcell		
MacSuain	MacSwan, MacSween, Swanson		
MacSual	Maxwell		
MacThaidhg	MacCaig		
MacTheàrlaich	Charleson, MacKerlich		
MacThom	MacComb, Thom		
MacThomaidh	MacCombie		
MacThorcadail	MacCorkindale, MacCorquodale		
MacThorcaill	Corkhill, Corkey, MacCorkill		
MacThàmhais	MacTavish, McTavish, Tavish, Tawse, Thomson, Thompson, Thomason, Tawesson/Taweson, Cash	as in Clan MacTavish of Dunardry in the Western Highlands	
MacThòmais	McComie, McColm, McComas, Comish, Thomson	as in Clan MacThomas of Finegand in the Eastern Highlands	
MacTiridh	MacKinnon	In Mull.	
MacTuirc	MacTurk	In Galloway.	
MacUalraig	Kennedy, Ulrick	In Lochaber.	
MacUaraig	Kennedy		
MacUchtraigh	MacAughtrie, Ochiltree, Coulthard	Ochiltree in Cowal.	
MacUilleim	MacWilliam, Quilliam, Wilson, Williamson		
MacUirigh	Currie, MacVurich	MacVurich on Arran.	
MacUisdein	Hugston, Hutcheon, Hutcheson, MacCutcheon, MacHugh, MacHutcheon, McCuistion, Whiston		
MacUrardaidh	Mackirdy		
MacUrardaigh	MacKirdie	Maciomhar MacIvor, MacKeever,	
MacUrchadain	Orchard, Orchardson		
MacUrchaidh	MacMurchie	On Arran.	
MacUsbaig	MacUsbaig	On Harris.	
MacÙisdein	Hutcheon, Hutcheson, MacCutcheon, MacHugh, MacHutcheon, Whiston		

=== Mao-U ===
Scottish Gaelic	English	Notes	Ref
Maoileanach, Maolanach	MacMillan		
MaolIosa	Mellis		
Matasan	Matheson	In the north.	
Mathanach	Matheson, Moannach	Matheson in the north.	
Matharnach	Matheson, Mathewson	In Wester Ross.	
Mawr, Maor	Maver, Mavor		
Moireach	Moray, Murray		
Moireasdan	Morrison		
Moireasdanach	Morrison		
Morgan	Morgan		
Morganach	MacKay, Morgan		
Munna	Munn		
Màrnach	Marno, Marnoch		
Màrr	Marr		
Màrtainn	Martin		
Mèinn	Menzies, Main		
Mèinnearach	Menzies		
Niocalsan	Nic(h)olson		
O' Brolchain	Bradley, Brodie, Brolochan	In Kintyre.	
O' Cain	O' Kean		
Ó Deargáin	Dergan, Dargan, Dorgan	In Leinster, Munster	
O' Cain	O' Kean		
O' Luingeachain	Laing, Lang, Loynachan	In Kintyre.	
Padarsan	Paterson		
Paorach	Power		
Peadarsan	Paterson		
Peucag	Peacock		
Peutan	Beaton, Bethune		
Preas	Birse		
Puidreach	Buttar, Butter	In Perthshire.	
Rathais	Rothes		
Robasan	Robertson, Robson, Robison		
Robasdan	Robertson, Robson, Robison	In the islands.	
Roid	Reid		
Roideach	Reid		
Ros	Ross		
Ròs	Rose		
Rosach	Ross		
Ròsach	Rose		
Rothach	Munro		
Ruadh	Reid, Roy		
Ruiseal	Russell		
Sailcirc	Selkirk		
Salmond	Salmond	Also MacBhradain	
Seadh	Shaw		
Seadhg	Shaw		
Seagha	Shaw		
Seaghach	Shaw		
Seathanach	Shaw		
Sgèin	Skene		
Sginnearach	Skinner	In Easter Ross.	
Sgot	Scott		
Singleir	Sinclair		
Siosal	Chisholm		
Siosalach	Chisholm		
Smios	Smith	On South Uist.	
Stiùbhart	Stewart, Stuart		
Stiùbhartach	Stewart, Stuart		
Sùdrach	Soutar		
Sutharlainn	Sutherland		
Sutharlan	Sutherland		
Suthurlanach	Sutherland		
Tod	Todd		
Todt	Todd		
Talmhach	Tolmie		
Tolmach	Tolmie		
Tuairnear	Turner		
Tàileach	Tallach		
Tàillear	Taylor		
Tulach	Tulloch, Tough		
Ualas	Wallace		
Umphraidh	Humphrey	In Braemar.	
Urchadainn	Urquhart		
Urchardan	Urquhart		

== See also ==
- List of Scottish Gaelic given names
- Scottish surnames
