= Quarrie =

Quarrie is the surname of the following people:

- Bruce Quarrie (1947–2004), English writer
- Dave Quarrie, English wheelchair curler
- Don Quarrie (born 1951), Jamaican sprinter
- George Quarrie (c. 1846–1926), Manx poet
- Kate Quarrie, Canadian politician

== See also ==
- McQuarrie
- MacQuarrie
