= Dargan =

Dargan may refer to:

== Places ==
- Dargan, Iran (disambiguation), places in Iran
- Dargan, Maryland, an unincorporated place in the United States
- Dargan, New South Wales, a village in New South Wales, Australia
- Dargan Bridge, Dublin, two different bridges in Ireland

== Other uses ==
- Dargan (surname)
