= MacBain =

MacBain may refer to:

- Clan MacBain, Scottish clan

People:

- Al MacBain (1925–2003), Liberal party member of the Canadian House of Commons
- Alexander Macbain (1855–1907), Scottish philologist, best known today for An Etymological Dictionary of the Gaelic Language (1896)
- John MacBain, the founder, president and chief executive officer of Trader Classified Media
- Louise Blouin MacBain, also known as Louise Blouin, (born 1958), French-Canadian magazine publisher and philanthropist
- Teresa MacBain, American atheist and activist

Geography:

- Mount Macbain, prominent Antarctic mountain between the mouths of Cornwall Glacier and Helm Glacier in the Queen Elizabeth Range

== See also ==
- MacBrayne (disambiguation)
- MacBrien
- McBain (disambiguation)
