= McGeachin =

McGeachin is a surname. Notable people with the surname include:

- Geoffrey McGeachin (born 1949), Australian photographer
- Janice McGeachin (born 1963), American politician

== See also ==
- McGeachie
