= Makoare =

Makoare is both a given name and a surname. It is a Māori transliteration of the name Macquarie. Notable people with the name include:

== Given name ==
- Makoare Te Taonui (c. 1790–1862), Māori chief

== Surname ==
- Lawrence Makoare (born 1968), New Zealand actor
