= McKechnie =

MacKechnie, McKechnie
Origin
- Language: Irish/Scottish Gaelic
- Meaning: son of Eacharn
- Region of origin: Scotland

Other names
- Variant forms: Eacharn; MacEachern; McEachern; McKeachie; McKeachy

MacKechnie and McKechnie are Irish/Scottish surnames. They are Anglicised forms of the Irish/Scottish Gaelic MacEacharna, meaning "son of Eacharn". The Irish/Scottish Gaelic personal name Eacharn is composed of two elements. The first element, each, means "horse"; the second element, tighearna, means "lord". In Scotland, the Scottish Gaelic MacEacharna has usually been Anglicised as McEachern. The surnames MacKechnie and McKechnie can be represented in Scottish Gaelic by MacEachainn, and MacEacharna. The McKechnies are a Sept of the Macdonalds of Clanranald.

== People with the surnames ==
McKechnie

- Bill McKechnie, American baseball player
- Brian McKechnie, New Zealand rugby and cricket player
- Donna McKechnie, American dancer, singer, actress and choreographer
- Elizabeth McKechnie, English actress
- Gilbert McKechnie, Scottish-born Ontario merchant and political figure
- Ian McKechnie, Scottish footballer
- Iain McKechnie, Canadian archaeologist
- James McKechnie, Scottish recipient of the Victoria Cross
- Jimmy McKechnie, Scottish footballer
- John McKechnie, former Justice of the Supreme Court of Western Australia
- John McKechnie (footballer), Scottish footballer
- Leigh McKechnie, Australian professional golfer
- Licorice McKechnie, Scottish musician and singer-songwriter
- Robert McKechnie, Canadian physician and chancellor of the University of British Columbia
- Roger McKechnie, English entrepreneur, founder of Innovative snack food brand Phileas Fogg
- Sheila McKechnie, Scottish trade unionist
- Shirley McKechnie, Australian dancer, choreographer, and director
- Tommy McKechnie, Scottish footballer
- Vera McKechnie, early British TV presenter
- Vivienne McKechnie, poet
- Walt McKechnie, Canadian hockey player
- William Neil McKechnie, senior Royal Air Force officer
- William Sharp McKechnie, Scottish historian and author
