= McKillip =

McKillip is a surname. Notable people with the surname include:

- Britt McKillip (born 1991), Canadian actress and singer
- Carly McKillip (born 1989), Canadian actress and musician
- Patricia A. McKillip (1948–2022), American author

== See also ==
- McKillop (surname)
