= Loch Tollaidh =

Scottish loch

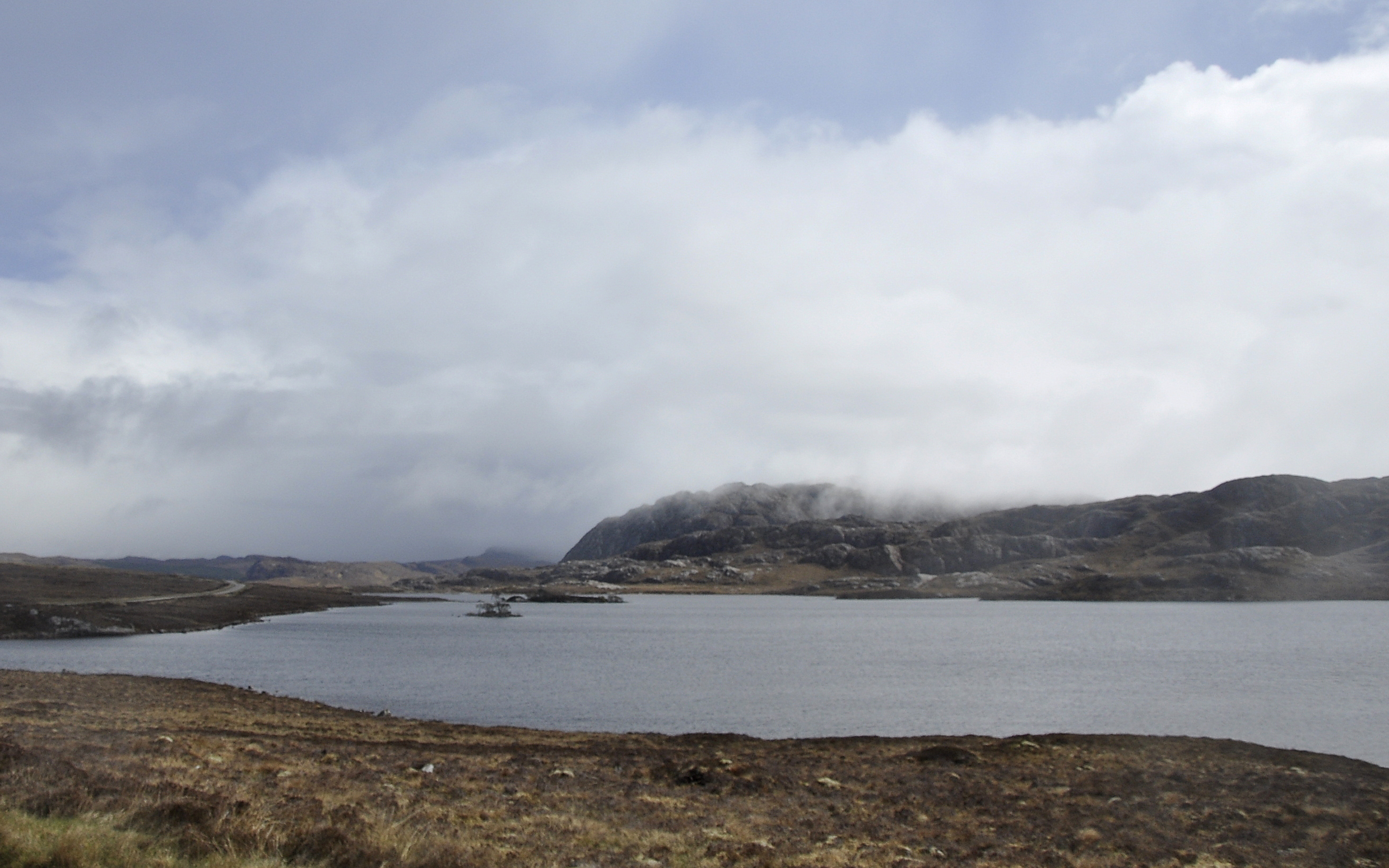
- Loch Tollaidh from the A832 road

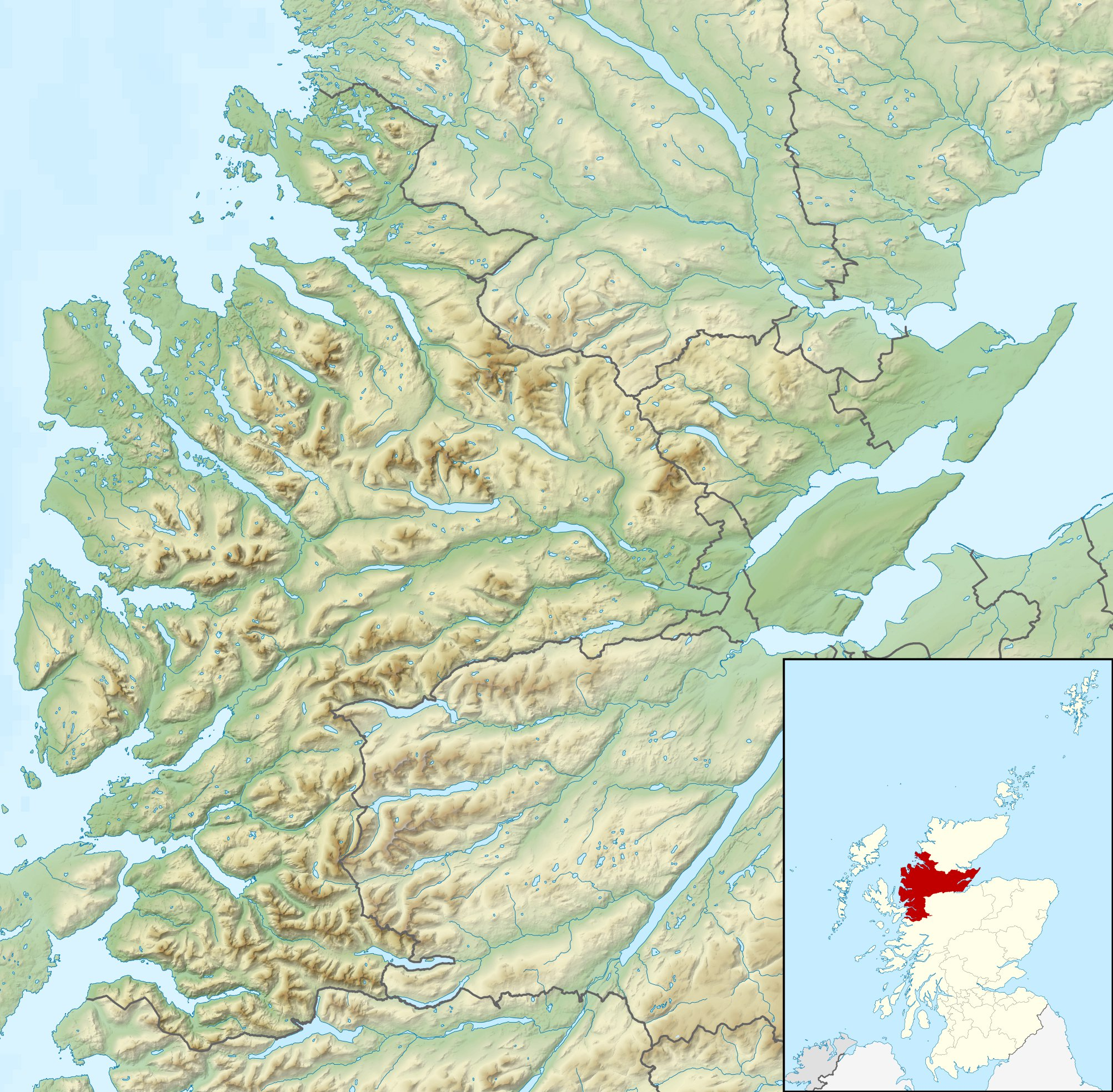
- Location within Ross and Cromarty
- Location: Scottish Highlands
- Coordinates: 57°44′40.3″N 5°37′44.1″W
- Primary outflows: Tollie Burn
- Basin countries: Scotland, United Kingdom
- Max. length: 1.42 km (0.88 mi)
- Max. width: 803 m (2,635 ft)
- Surface elevation: 120 m (390 ft)
- Islands: 4

Loch Tollaidh is a freshwater loch in Wester Ross, Scotland, roughly 2.3 km southwest of the village of Poolewe. It sits beside the A832 road in a large expanse of moorland.

The loch's name derives from the Scottish Gaelic toll, meaning "hole" or "hollow" i.e. "Loch of the Hollow".

Loch Tollaidh sits on a bedrock of Lewisian gneiss, and has several excellent bouldering crags on its southern shore.

Several small islands sit within the loch, the largest of which is believed to have been a crannog. Several texts from the early 20th century describe a later stone "castle" occupying the site, in the hands of Clans MacBeth and then MacLeod before its abandonment in 1480. Underwater remains show evidence of stone causeways.

A small commercial Atlantic salmon farm operated on the loch from the late 1980s until its removal in the late 2010s.
