= Scottish surnames =

Surname found in Scotland or with a historical connection to Scotland

Scottish surnames are surnames found in Scotland, or surnames that have a historical connection with the country.

== History ==
The earliest surnames found in Scotland occur during the reign of David I, King of Scots (1124–53). These were Anglo-Norman names which had become hereditary in England before arriving in Scotland (for example, the contemporary surnames de Brus, de Umfraville, and Ridel). During the reigns of kings David I, Malcolm IV and William the Lion, some inhabitants of Scottish towns were English and Flemish settlers, who bore English and continental personal names, with trade names and sometimes nicknames. One of the earliest sources for surnames in Scotland is the Ragman Roll. This document records the deeds of homage pledged by Scots nobles to Edward I, King of England in 1296. The surnames recorded within are for the most part very similar to those found in England at around the same date, consisting of local, patronymic and occupational names, and nicknames. Some of the local surnames with the roll are derived from places within Scotland; there are very few Gaelic surnames recorded in the roll.

== Categorisation ==
=== Patronymics ===
Many Scottish surnames originate from names that were originally patronyms. Patronyms are derived from the forename of the bearer's father (for example, the full name of a man named John Donaldson indicates that the father's name was Donald). Patronyms change with every successive generation (for example, the patronyms of a grandson, father, and grandfather may be John Donaldson, son of Donald Robertson, son of Robert Williamson).

The earliest patronyms recorded in Scotland are written in several different languages. In early Latin documents, such names were formed by the genitive case of the father's name preceded by forms of filius, meaning "son" (for example Dugaldus filius Nigelli); later the filius was only implied (for example Dugaldus Nigelli). (Note: In names where filius is implied, it is sometimes difficult to know whether the name refers to a Dugald who is actually a son of Nigel, or if he is just a Dugald who is descended in several generations from a Nigel.) Other early records show patronyms using forms of the Welsh ap, meaning "son"; and the Gaelic mac, meaning son (for example, the names of Macrath ap Molegan, and Gilmychel Mac Eth appear in the same document). (Note: Both Macrath, and Gilmychel, were recorded as being from Dumfriesshire.)

There are several prefixes and suffixes that may indicate whether a modern surname originated from a patronym: the English suffixes -son, and -s; and the Gaelic prefix Mac-. In some cases, the -son was dropped from such surnames, and just the forename of an ancestor was used (for example Martin). In some cases, the suffix -s was used, and according to Black, such names appear to have originated in England (for example Adams).

The use of patronyms died out in the Lowlands after the 15th century, as they became solidified as surnames. It was not until the 18th century that they were given up in the Gaelic-speaking Highlands. As late as the first part of the 18th century, some men were distinguished not only by their father's name, but their grandfather's and great-grandfather's (for example, John Roy M'Ean Vc Ewin Vc Dougall Vc Ean, a man from Lismore recorded in 1585). (Note: This names equates to Modern Scottish Gaelic: Iain Ruadh mac Iain mhic Eòghainn mhic Dhùghaill mhic Iain; or in English: John the Red, son of John, son of Ewen, son of Dougal, son of John.) Patronyms were still common in Shetland in the first half of the 19th century. One of the most common surnames in Scotland is Simpson, which means the son of "Simon", in Gaelic the equivalent names are McSymon, and MacSymon.

=== Territorial names, topographical names ===
Many of the first surnames recorded in Scotland were those of nobles, or great landowners, whose surnames derived from the lands they possessed. These names are sometimes called territorial names, or habitation names. Many of these surnames were brought to Scotland by Anglo-Normans, whose surnames were derived from either lands in Normandy or in England (for example, Bruce is derived from Brix in Manche, France, Crawford is derived from Crawford, South Lanarkshire, in the south of Scotland, Barton is derived from Dumbarton, or the several villages and towns in England, and Graham is derived from Grantham, in Lincolnshire, England). Not all territorial surnames are derived from lands owned by their bearers. In some cases such names were borne by tenants, or followers, of the owners of the lands they lived on. In this way the bearers of these surnames may not have had any kinship with the landowners (the surname Gordon is an historical example of such a name).

Some Scottish surnames are derived from vague geographical locations rather than specific places. These names are sometimes called "topographic names". These names refer to physical features, like forests, streams, and marshes; such names may also refer to man-made structures, such as castles and churches (for example the surnames Wood, Milne, and Shaw). Sometimes names derived from proper names of geographical features can be classified as topographic names rather than habitational names. This is because these names refer to a location rather than a specific settlement.

=== Occupational names ===
Many surnames are derived from the occupations, or trades, of their original bearers (for example, Stewart, Shepherd, Mason, Kemp, Webb, and Fletcher). In time, true occupational surnames became hereditary and were passed down through families (for example, in 1525 there is a record of a woman named Agnes Beltmakar, who is described as a kaikbakstar). (Note: Several hundred years before she would have been known as Agnes 'the maker of belts and girdles', rather than Agnes 'the baker of cakes'.) Occupational names were rare amongst Gaelic speakers Examples of such surnames derived from Gaelic occupational name is Gow, from the Scottish Gaelic Gobha (smith), and MacIntyre from Mac an t-Saoir ([ˈmaxk ən̪ˠ ˈt̪ʰɯːɾʲ] "son of the carpenter." Macpherson means "son of the parson", from the Gaelic surname Mac a' Phearsain.

=== Bynames ===
Bynames, to-names, or other names, (Note: From the Old English tō-nama.) were once very common in Scotland. These names were used in areas where there were few names in circulation, and the bynames were added onto the name of person, in order to distinguish them from others who bore the same name. Bynames were particularly prevalent in fishing communities in the northeastern part of Scotland, but were also used in the Borders and the West Highlands. In some cases within fishing communities, the names of fishing boats were tacked onto the names of people in order to differentiate them from others.

Examples of Scottish surnames derived from nicknames are: Little; White; and Meikle (which means "much" or "great"). One of the most common Scottish surnames is Campbell, which is derived from the Gaelic Caimbeul, meaning "crooked-mouth". Similarly, Cameron is derived from the Gaelic Camshron, meaning "crooked-nose". Another common Scottish surname is Armstrong, which means the son of a strong man.

=== Regional names, or ethnic names ===
Some Scottish surnames can be classified as either "regional names" or "ethnic names". These names originally referred to the origin of the bearer and tended to have been acquired by people who migrated a considerable distance for their original homes. In other cases, such names were sometimes borne by people who were connected with a foreign place (such as a trader). Examples of ethnic surnames are Fleming, Galbraith, Scott, and Wallace.

== Scottish clans ==
Many Scottish surnames are the names of Scottish clans that were once powerful families dominating large swaths of territory. However, it is a common misconception that every person who bears a clan's name is a lineal descendant of the chiefs of that particular clan. (Note: For example, a recent and ongoing DNA study shows that about 13% of men taking part in the Clan Donald DNA project, most of whom bear forms of the surname Macdonald, are lineal descendants of one man, possibly Somhairle the grandfather of Clan Donald's eponymous ancestor, Domhnall mac Raghnaill.) There are several reasons for this. In many cases, the families that originally lived on the lands acquired by powerful clans (such as the Campbells, Gordons, Macdonalds, and Mackenzies) adopted the names of their new lords. (Note: From the beginning of the 16th century, as tenants of the Earl of Seaforth, the native clans of Lewis followed the Mackenzies. An account of Lewis, written in about 1750, states: "the common inhabitants of Lewis are Morisons, McAulays and McKivers, but when they go from home, all who live under Seaforth call themselves Mackenzies". The Campbells are known to have swallowed the names of several smaller clans that they dominated over, such as in the case of the MacIvers of Lergachonzie sometime after the mid 16th century.) The leadership of large clans increased their power by increasing the number of their followers by both conciliation and coercion. The memory of such renaming is sometimes preserved in tradition. One old Gaelic saying reads: Frisealach am boll a mine ("the Frasers of the boll of meal"), which explains that some of name Fraser are actually Bissets, who originally controlled the lands taken by the Frasers. (Note: There are similar traditions associated with the Farquharsons, Forbeses, and Gordons. One associated with the Cumins reads: Cuminich clach nan cearc ("Cumins of the hen-trough"), to distinguish certain renamed families from the lineal Cumins of the clan.)

In the 17th and 18th centuries, the clan name of the MacGregors was outlawed, and members of the clan were forced to assume other names. When the bans were lifted once and for all, some of the clan resumed using forms of MacGregor—but not all. (Note: The name was first proscribed by an Act of Parliament in 1603. The proscription was rescinded in 1661, but revived in 1693; it wasn't abolished once and for all until 1784.) In some cases, the name of a clan may be identical to the surname of another family, yet there is no etymological link between the employed surname, and there is no historical connection between the different families (for example, the Hebridean/Kintyre surname Brodie is not connected to the surname of the Brodies of Brodie, who were centred in Moray). (Note: The Brodies from the Hebrides and Kintyre are thought to be a branch of the O'Brologhan family who were centred in County Londonderry, Ireland. In modern times their Gaelic surname has been Anglicised into the form used by Brodies of Clan Brodie.) Similarly, a surname derived from a patronym, may be used by numerous unconnected families descended from a like-named individual (for example, the bardic family of the surname MacEwan employed by the Campbells are not connected to the MacEwens of Otter). (Note: The bardic MacEwans are actually MacDougalls, or possibly O'Hoseys.) Historian Charles Ian Fraser stated in his history of the Clan Munro that the bond between clansman and chief cannot in every instance have been that of a common blood.

=== Scottish heraldry ===
Scottish heraldry operates under the implication that everyone who shares the same surname might be related. The position of the standing court of heraldry in Scotland, the Court of the Lord Lyon, considers that everyone who shares the same surname as a recognised chief, is a member of that chief's clan. In consequence, where a coat of arms already exists for the chief of a clan, or head of a family, when new grants of arms to individuals with the same surname are being discussed with the client, then the suggestions put forward are generally variations of those arms (for example, one of the oldest families of Argyll are the Fergussons of Glensellich; this clan is not related or historically connected in any way to the Fergussons of Kilkerran who the Lord Lyon King of Arms considers to be the Chief of the Name and Arms of Fergusson; consequently, the arms of Fergusson of Glensellich are based upon the arms of Fergusson of Kilkerran).

== Influences ==
=== Gaelic ===
Not all surnames that begin with the prefix Mac- are truly derived from patronyms. Forms of the surnames MacBeth and MacRae are derived from the Gaelic personal names Mac-bethad and Mac-raith. The prefix in such cases means "pupil", "devotee", "disciple". (Other examples can be found under the section Occupational Surnames). Also, not all names beginning with the prefix are derived from Gaelic personal names; in areas along the Lowland border, the prefix was added to the diminutives of non-Gaelic personal names ending with the suffix -ie (for example, McRitchie, MacWillie). Other Lowland, or English, diminutives of personal names ending with the suffixes -on, and -in, were borrowed by Gaelic speakers (for example Rankin to Macrankin, Gibbon to Macgibbon).

=== Norse ===
In the northern Hebrides, many of the indigenous surnames are derived from Gaelicised Norse personal names (for example, MacAmhlaigh → Macaulay, MacAsgaill → Macaskill, and MacLeòid → Macleod). Such 'Norse' names in these areas are in complete contrast to the indigenous surnames of the adjacent islands and lands to the south. Some surnames brought to Scotland in the Middle Ages by English, or Anglo-Normans, are also derived from Norse personal names.

=== Anglo-Normans ===
Nearly all the surnames brought to Britain by the Normans were territorial names derived from lands on the continent. In some families where patronyms were used, once a man acquired lands in Britain he would assume his surname from these lands. Norman patronyms were made up of mainly three types of names: Germanic names derived from Frankish names; other Germanic names derived from Norse names; and Latin and Greek names, many of which were religious names. Many diminutive suffixes were introduced with the Normans (for example, -el, -et, -ett, -ot, -at, -en, -in, -oc, -on, -uc, and -cock). These suffixes were added to pet-forms of names (for example, Adkin diminutive of Adam, and Paton from Patrick).

The name Fraser (Gaelic Friseal) has a unique etymology; it originally derives from the French fraise, meaning strawberry.

== Most common surnames ==
The top twenty most common surnames in Scotland are shown below. The data were mostly gathered from the 2001 UK electoral register. This register was made up of all people over the age of 16 who were entitled to vote in elections in the UK. The data was further enhanced with names of people that were not entitled to vote. In 2001, a change in law made it possible for people to opt out of having their information publicly viewable; thus the 2001 register has been considered by at least one recent study to be the most recent reliable source for determining the most common surnames in Scotland.

1. Smith (1.28%) (occupational name)
2. Brown (0.94%) (nickname)
3. Wilson (0.89%) (patronym)
4. Robertson (0.78%) (patronym)
5. Thomson (0.78%) (patronym)
6. Campbell (0.77%) (nickname)
7. Stewart (0.73%) (occupational name)
8. Anderson (0.70%) (patronym)
9. Scott (0.55%) (ethnic name)
10. Murray (0.53%) (territorial name)
11. MacDonald (0.52%) (patronym)
12. Reid (0.52%) (nickname)
13. Taylor (0.49%) (occupational name)
14. Clark (0.47%) (occupational name)
15. Ross (0.43%) (territorial name)
16. Young (0.42%) (nickname)
17. Mitchell (0.41%) (patronym; nickname)
18. Watson (0.41%) (patronym)
19. Paterson (0.40%) (patronym)
20. Morrison (0.40%) (patronym)

== Extinction ==
While the total bearers of specific surnames have grown in number over the years, such as the names of the most dominant clans, some Scottish surnames have completely died out in the country (for example, the family with the Hebridean surname MacUspaig, derived from a Gaelicised Norse personal name, died out in the male line shortly after the turn of the 20th century).

== Surname changes ==
Anyone whose birth is registered in Scotland, or who was legally adopted in Scotland, may apply to register a surname change. Children under the age of 16 are only allowed to change their surname once. For people over the age of 16, a total of three surname changes are allowed, however a period of five years must elapse between each successive name change. In some cases, surname changes are allowed if the person receives a decree, or certificate of change, from the Lord Lyon King of Arms; or if certain certified wills, settlements, or deeds of trust, contain conditions where a person must take a surname different from the one which they were registered at birth; or when a male has married and changed his surname following his marriage, and has received a decree or certificate from the Lord Lyon King of Arms. Surname changes can consist of substituting one surname for another (for example, from Brown to Johnson); changing the spelling of the surname (for example, from Brown to Broun); or changing surname by hyphenation (for example, from Brown to Brown-Johnson) (see also: double-barrelled name).

== Scottish surnames as given names ==
In recent years, names that have been traditionally surnames have been used as given names, particularly in North America. These names are sometimes given to both males and females (for example, the given name Mackenzie, taken from the Scottish surname Mackenzie, is given to girls more than boys in North America; another North American given name used for both sexes is Cameron derived from the surname Cameron).

The male name Douglas has become very popular throughout the commonwealth countries, and is derived from the Douglas clan.

== See also ==
- List of Scottish Gaelic surnames, Scottish Gaelic surnames and their English equivalents
- Scottish Gaelic personal naming system
- Welsh surnames, the surnames of Wales
- Cornish surnames, the surnames of Cornwall
- Manx surnames, the surnames of the Isle of Man
- History of Scotland, and Scotland in the High Middle Ages
