= Nicholson =

Nicholson may refer to:

- Nicholson (surname), a surname, and a list of people with the name

== Places ==
=== Australia ===
- Nicholson, Victoria
- Nicholson, Queensland
- Nicholson County, New South Wales
- Nicholson River (disambiguation)
- Nicholson Road, Perth
- Nicholson Street, Melbourne

=== Hong Kong ===
- Mount Nicholson, Hong Kong Island

=== New Zealand ===
- Port Nicholson, former name of Wellington Harbour, New Zealand

=== United States ===
- Nicholson, Georgia
- Nicholson Island (Pennsylvania)
- Nicholson, Mississippi
- Nicholson, Pennsylvania
- Nicholson, Wisconsin
- Nicholson Township, Fayette County, Pennsylvania
- Nicholson Township, Wyoming County, Pennsylvania
- Dr. Malcolm Nicholson Farmhouse, a historic farmhouse in Havana, Florida

== Craters ==
- Nicholson crater, in Canada
- Nicholson (lunar crater)
- Nicholson (Martian crater)

== Other uses ==
- Crest Nicholson, British housebuilding company
- Fanny Nicholson, Australian sailing ship that sank in 1874
- Nicholson's, a brewery in Maidenhead from 1840-1960
- Nicholson v. Haldimand-Norfolk Reg. Police Commrs., Supreme Court of Canada decision
- USS Nicholson, several ships in the United States Navy
- Nicholson Guides, a range of maps of United Kingdom inland waterways
- Nicholson & Co Ltd, builder of church organs, Worcester, England, since 1841

== See also ==
- Nicolson
