= Nicholson River =

Nicholson River may refer to:

- Nicholson River (Queensland)
- Nicholson River (Victoria)
- Nicholson River (Western Australia)

== See also ==
- Nicholson (disambiguation)
