= MacCrimmon =

MacCrimmon or McCrimmon may refer to:

== People ==
- Brad McCrimmon (1959–2011), Canadian professional ice-hockey player
- Brenna MacCrimmon; see Crossing the Bridge: The Sound of Istanbul
- Katie Kerwin McCrimmon (born 1965), American television reporter
- Kevin McCrimmon (born 1941), American mathematician

== Other ==
- MacCrimmon (piping family), a Scottish family of pipers to the chiefs of Clan MacLeod
- Jamie McCrimmon, a fictional character in the British television series Doctor Who
- The Black Bonspiel of Wullie MacCrimmon, a 1951 play by Canadian author W.O. Mitchell
