= 52nd Scripps National Spelling Bee =

Spelling bee held in the United States in 1979

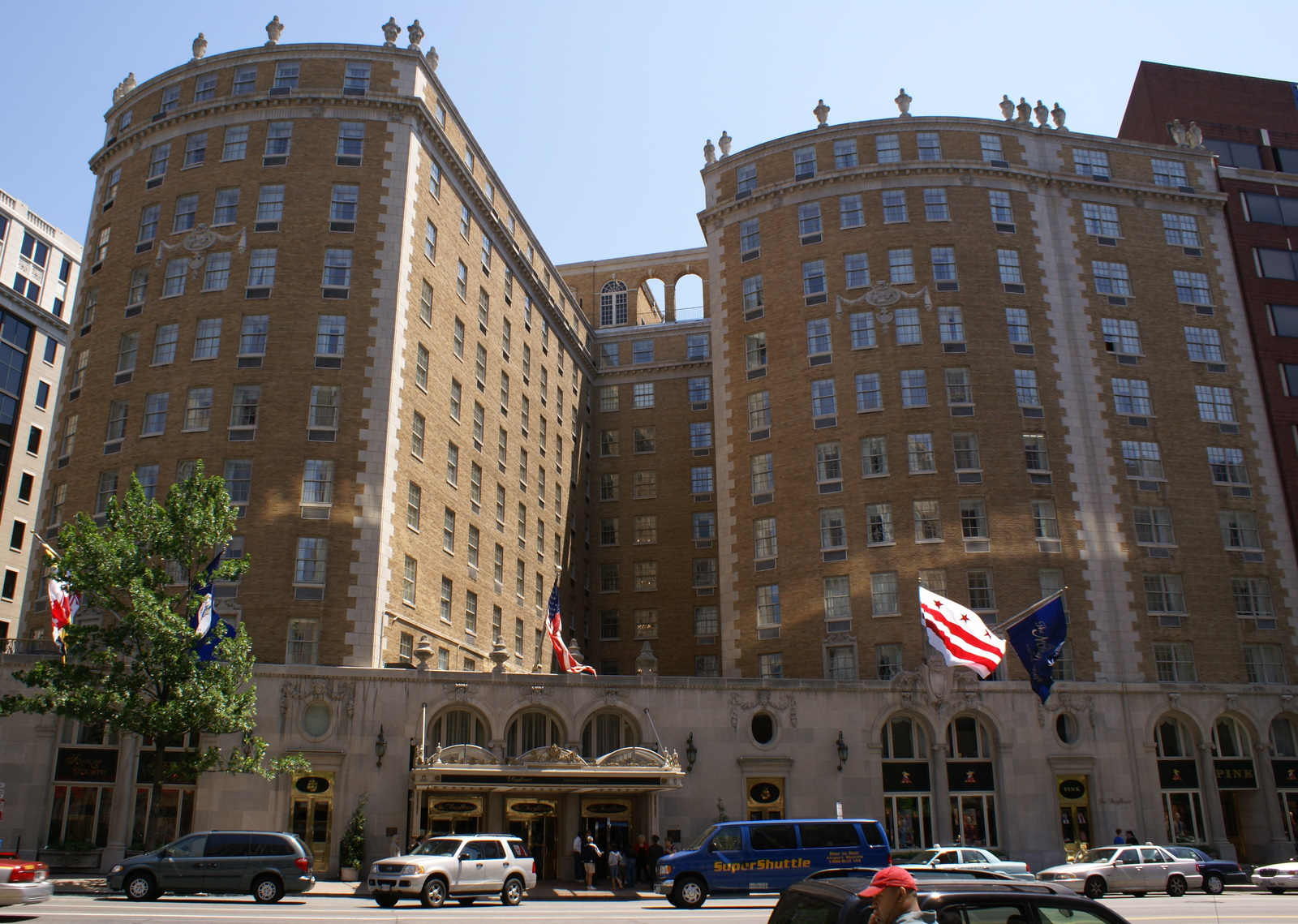
- The Mayflower Hotel, site of the 52nd National Spelling Bee. The competition moved to the Capital Hilton the next year.
- Date: June 6–7, 1979
- Location: The Mayflower Hotel in Washington, D.C.
- Winner: Katie Kerwin (13 at time of win)
- Sponsor: Rocky Mountain News
- Sponsor location: Denver, Colorado
- Winning word: maculature
- No. of contestants: 109
- Pronouncer: Richard R. Baker

The 52nd Scripps National Spelling Bee was held at the Mayflower Hotel in Washington, D.C., on June 6–7, 1979, sponsored by the E.W. Scripps Company.

== Competition ==
Katie Kerwin McCrimmon, 13, of Colorado won the competition, spelling "maculature". Her brother Greg had been in the 1973 bee, and sister Mary in 1975. She would later go on to become a TV commentator of the Bee once it began being broadcast on television. The competition saw Julie Won of Mechanicsburg, Pennsylvania run second, losing on the word "virescence". She had taken third place the previous year.

The competition had 109 contestants, a new record at the time, 63 girls and 46 boys, ranging from age 10 to 14. By the end of the first day, only 32 spellers remained. The second day started with the completion of the seventh round, which eliminated six more.

Richard Baker served as pronouncer.
