= Downie (disambiguation) =

Downie is a surname. It may also refer to:

An ableist slur against people with the disability of Down's Syndrome

- Downie Township, Ontario, Canada
- Downie Peak, British Columbia, Canada
- Downie Creek (Columbia River tributary), British Columbia
- Downie Hills, Scotland, a range of hills
- Downie Point, Scotland
- Downie River, California, United States

== See also ==
- Downie bodies
- Downie's spotted leaf beetle
- Downie's Loup, a Scottish waterfall
