= Dargan, Iran =

Dargan (Persian: دارگان or درگن) in Iran may refer to:

- Dargan, Hormozgan (درگن - Dargan)
- Dargan, Isfahan (دارگان - Dārgān)
- Dargan, Yazd (دارگان - Dārgān)
