= Tolmie =

Tolmie is a surname of Scottish origin.

== People ==
- Donald Tolmie (1923–2009), Canadian politician
- Fraser Tolmie, 21st-century Canadian politician
- Frances Tolmie (1840–1926), Scottish folklorist from Isle of Skye
- J. C. Tolmie (James Craig Tolmie, 1862–1938), Canadian politician and military chaplain
- James Tolmie (Canadian politician) (1855–1917), politician in British Columbia, Canada
- James Tolmie (Australian politician) (1862–1939), Queensland newspaper owner and politician
- Jim Tolmie (born 1960), Scottish footballer who played for Manchester
- John Tolmie (1845–1916), Canadian politician
- Julia Tolmie, 21st-century New Zealand legal academic
- Simon Fraser Tolmie, son of William Fraser Tolmie and 21st Premier of British Columbia
- William Fraser Tolmie (1812–1886), Hudson's Bay Company officer and British Columbia politician
- William Tolmie (politician) (1833–1875), Scots-born New Zealand politician

== Places ==
=== Australia ===
- Tolmie, Victoria, a small rural town in central Victoria

=== Canada ===
- Mount Tolmie, a hill and adjoining neighbourhood in Saanich, British Columbia, named for William Fraser Tolmie
- Tolmie Channel, a reach of the Inside Passage in British Columbia along the east side of Princess Royal Island, named for William Fraser Tolmie
- Tolmie Point, a point on Princess Royal Island west of the northern tip of Sarah Island, named for William Fraser Tolmie

=== United States ===
- Tolmie Peak, a mountain in Mount Rainier National Park, Washington named for William Fraser Tolmie
- Tolmie State Park, near Olympia, Washington
