= George Quarrie =

Manx poet from the turn of the 20th century

George Quarrie (c. 1846 – 1926) was a Manx poet active in the 1880s–1910s, best known for his poem, The Melliah.

Quarrie was born at Ballavair, Kirk Bride, in around 1846, the eighth child of John Quarrie and Mary Hardie. By 1881 he was a General Commission Agent in Barrow-in-Furness, where he was married.

It was when in England that Quarrie published The Melliah, initially in 1880 and then in 1883. The poem recalls in Manx dialect the traditional Manx process and celebration of collecting in the harvest. This poem, written of a specific Melliah at the Ballavair farm in the 1850s, came to be celebrated as a poem that "pulses with reality and humour and a hearty enjoyment of life." Recording individual characters and occurrences from the Melliah that Quarrie enjoyed in his youth, the poem represents one of the key sources for one of the major festivals in the traditional Manx farming calendar. The vividness and richness of Quarrie's description of the Melliah was the main source behind an important scene in Hall Caine's The Manxman. This apparent plagiarism caused much controversy in the Manx newspapers once Quarrie's detailed explication of the connection between the two works was published in October 1889.

Quarrie emigrated to New York City in 1889 where he gained considerable success as a journalist over the subsequent forty years. By September 1898 he was living at 2720 Atlantic Avenue, Brooklyn, where he had a daughter. By 1913 Quarrie was signing his poems from 230 W. 116 St., New York, and by April 1918 he was living at 330 East 55th Street.

Whilst in America, Quarrie continued to write poems about his youth in the north of the Isle of Man, receiving comments in the Manx press such as: "Mr Quarrie knew the Isle of Man thoroughly. This was proved in almost every line of his poetry." As well as his literary connection to Hall Caine, Quarrie is recognised as having influenced P. W. Caine and W. Walter Gill. His obituary in the Isle of Man Examiner said of his work that it consisted of: "poems possessing considerable literary merit, and recording with rare gusto and fidelity aspects of Manx life and character".

His other published poetry included pieces expressing a complex mix of political views: celebrations of British Colonial wars, complaint of the British treatment of Parnell in the struggle for Irish Home Rule, mocking of socialism, and defence of the working class against the conservative policies of the 1880s and 90s. This engagement in the politics of the UK and the Isle of Man continued until the end of his life, such as in his engaging in pro-war propaganda poems against "the Hun" during World War I. He died in New York City at the age of 80 at the start of August 1926.

== Bibliography ==
- The Melliah, Boh!, Barrow: Carruthers Brothers, 1880
- 'Old Coaching Days in the Isle of Man', Manx Sun, 3 Sep 1898
- 'Nell Kerruish', Manx Sun, 1 October 1898
- 'Abdulla and Omdurman', Manx Sun, 22 October 1898
- 'Kitty of Lough-ne-Yeigh', Manx Sun, 19 November 1898
- 'Grandma's Christmas Story', Manx Sun, 24 December 1898
- 'The British Arms', Manxman, 7 April 1900
- 'Johnnie Finn and the Dublin Fusiliers', The Manxman, 5 May 1900
- 'The Men who have no Hoes', Isle of Man Times, 19 January 1901
- 'Glewn Nee-a-Nee!', Manx Sun, 15 March 1902
- 'On Reading the Courier', Ramsey Courier, 5 December 1913
- 'Nell a'Vris', Manx Quarterly, No. 17, 1916
- 'A Protest', Peel City Guardian, 2 September 1916
- 'Juan-a-Beth', Isle of Man Examiner, 6 January 1917
- 'The First Reaping Machine in Mona and the Passing of the Sickle', Manx Quarterly, No. 19, 1918
- 'A War Rubaiyat', Manx Quarterly, No. 19, 1918
- 'Old Times at the Church-Up at Kirk Bride', Isle of Man Examiner, 10 May 1919
- 'Near and Yet so Far', Isle of Man Examiner, 10 May 1919
- 'A Place to Remember', Isle of Man Examiner, 4 September 1920
- 'When the Tide is Coming in', Isle of Man Examiner, 4 September 1920
- 'A Place to Remember: Sentiments of a Sentimental Visitor', Manx Quarterly, No. 24, 1921
- 'The Sheeja', Manx Quarterly, No. 25, 1921
- 'The Dog Mill Shore', Manx Quarterly, No. 26, 1921
- 'Tittlewhack', Manx Quarterly, No. 26, 1921
