= Beaton medical kindred =

Scottish kindred of professional physicians

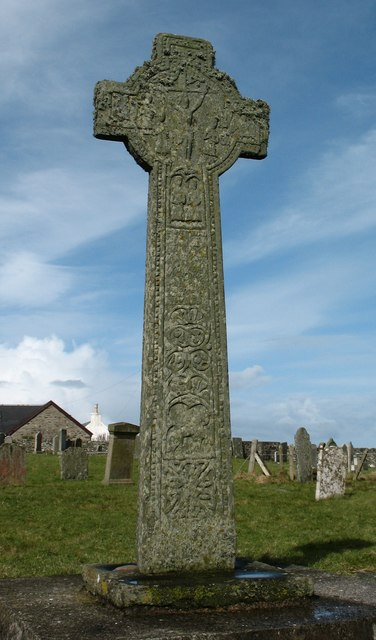
A fourteenth- or fifteenth-century free-standing cross, Kilchoman, Islay. The cross is dedicated to a certain Thomas, son of a doctor named Patrick. These men may well have been members of the Beaton medical kindred.

The Beaton medical kindred, was a Scottish kindred of professional physicians that practised medicine in the classical Gaelic tradition from the Middle Ages to the Early Modern Era.

The kindred appears to have emigrated from Ireland in the fourteenth century, where members seem to have originally learned their craft. According to tradition, the kindred first arrived in Scotland in the retinue of the Áine Ní Chatháin, daughter of Cú Maighe na nGall Ó Catháin; Áine married Aonghus Óg Mac Domhnaill in about 1300. In time the kindred came to be prominent in the Scottish Highlands and Islands, although the earliest known member appears on record in the Lowlands, in Dumfries, during the early fourteenth century. The kindred first came to be associated with Islay in the early fifteenth century, and afterwards proceeded to spread to other islands. Eventually, the kindred became the largest and longest serving of the three major mediaeval medical dynasties in Gaelic Scotland.

The kindred is commonly confused with the unrelated Bethune or Beaton family, historically centred in Fife. In fact, the medical kindred adopted the surname Beaton in the fifteenth century. By the seventeenth century, most of the seventeen or so families within the kindred had adopted the surname Beaton, although two used the surname Bethune. Partly as a result, members of the medical kindred mistakenly came to think of themselves as descended from the Bethunes of Balfour, the principal branch of the aforesaid Bethune or Beaton family (who were ultimately of Continental origin). (Note: The Bethune or Beaton family has its origins in Béthune, in Pas-de-Calais, France. By the thirteenth century they were settled in Fife and Angus. Another reason for the confusion between the medical kindred and the Beaton/Bethune family is the fact that members of the latter family also practised medicine. For example, one was apparently employed by the Camerons of Lochiel.)

Like other learned Gaelic families, members of the kindred copied and compiled manuscripts. According to Martin Martin, just before the turn of the eighteenth century, a member of the kindred possessed a library of manuscripts of works of Avicenna, Averroes, Joannes de Vigo, Bernardus Gordonus, and Hippocrates. The most substantial surviving example of such a work compiled by the kindred is an early sixteenth-century Gaelic translation of Gordonus' Lilium medicinae, the largest Gaelic manuscript in Scotland.

There have been as many as seventy-six physicians of the kindred identified between the years 1300 and 1750. Members were employed by every Scottish monarch between Robert I, King of Scotland (died 1329) and Charles I, King of Scotland (died 1649), and patronised by numerous Scottish clans such as the Frasers of Lovat, MacDonald Lords of the Isles, the MacLeans of Duart, the MacLeods of Dunvegan, and the Munros of Foulis. By the eighteenth century, the family ceased to produce hereditary physicians. The last died in 1714, described as "the only scholar of his race".

== See also ==
- MacMhuirich bardic family, another major learned Gaelic kindred
- Ó Cuindlis, a learned Gaelic kindred of Ireland

== In popular culture ==
In the television series Outlander (season one, episode two), character Claire Randall, a nurse, is asked if she is "a Beaton" given that she helped another character with both a dislocated shoulder and a bullet wound. The scene is taken from the eponymous first book in the series of historical novels on which the television programs are based. In Chapter 7, Claire goes through the workspace of a fictional Davie Beaton, the now-deceased physician of Castle Leoch, providing the reader with a harrowing view of cutting-edge 18th-century medicine.
