= Cryptocephalus downiei =

Scientific classification
- Kingdom: Animalia
- Phylum: Arthropoda
- Clade: Pancrustacea
- Class: Insecta
- Order: Coleoptera
- Suborder: Polyphaga
- Infraorder: Cucujiformia
- Family: Chrysomelidae
- Genus: Cryptocephalus
- Species: C. downiei

Binomial name
- Cryptocephalus downiei E. Riley & Gilbert, 2000

Species of beetle

Cryptocephalus downiei, or Downie's spotted leaf beetle, is a species of case-bearing leaf beetle in the family Chrysomelidae. It is found in North America. The specific epithet downiei honors American psychologist and coleopterist Norville Downie.
