= Beaton (surname) =

Beaton is a Scottish surname which may have multiple origins.

One origin of the name is from the placename Béthune, in Pas-de-Calais, France and is associated with the lowland clan Bethune. Another derivation of the surname is an Anglicisation of the Scottish Gaelic Mac Beath, and corresponds to the Beaton medical kindred of the Scottish Highlands and Western Isles. The surname Beaton can be represented in modern Scottish Gaelic as Peutan (masculine form), and Pheutan (feminine).

Another suggested derivation is from the mediaeval personal name Beaton or Beton, a pet form of a short form of the names Bartholomew or Beatrice. Bartholomew is a masculine name, while Beatrice is feminine; the names are not etymologically related to each other.

Notable people with the surname include:

- Alaina Beaton (born 1985), American singer-songwriter known as Porcelain Black
- Alexander Beaton (disambiguation), several people
- Alistair Beaton (born 1947), Scottish political satirist, novelist and television writer
- Cecil Beaton (1904–1980), English photographer
- David Beaton (c. 1494–1546), last Scottish Cardinal prior to the Reformation
- Ewan Beaton (born 1969), Canadian judoka
- James Beaton (1473–1539), Archbishop of Glasgow
- James Beaton II (1517–1603), Archbishop of Glasgow
- Jim Beaton (born 1943), British police officer
- M. C. Beaton, pseudonym of Marion Chesney
- Kate Beaton (born 1983), Canadian webcomic author
- Mary Beaton, attendant of Mary, Queen of Scots
- Noel Beaton (1925–2004), Australian politician
- Norman Beaton (1934–1994), Guyanese actor
- Rod Beaton (news executive) (1923–2002), American journalist and media executive
- Rod Beaton (sportswriter) (1951–2011), American sports journalist
- Roderick Beaton, British academic
- Ronsford Beaton, Montserrat-born Guyanese cricketer
- Rosie Beaton, Australian radio announcer
- Steve Beaton (born 1964), English darts player
