= McGavin =

MacGavin, McGavin
Origin
- Language: Scottish Gaelic
- Meaning: son of the smith
- Region of origin: Scotland

Other names
- Variant forms: MacGowan, McGowan

The surnames MacGavin and McGavin are Scottish surnames, which are possibly variations of the surnames McGowan and MacGowan, which are Anglicised forms of the Scottish Gaelic MacGobhann and Irish Gaelic Mac Gabhann, meaning "son of the smith". When the surname MacGavin and McGavin originate from Glasgow and Moray, they can be represented in Scottish Gaelic as Mac a' Ghobhainn.

== People with the surnames ==
McGavin

- Andrew McGavin (1879–1946), Canadian political figure
- Charles McGavin (1874–1940), US political figure
- Darren McGavin (1922–2006), US film and television actor
- Donald Johnstone McGavin (1876–1960), New Zealand surgeon
- George McGavin (born 1954), British entomologist, television presenter
- Hugh McGavin (1874–1958), Canadian political figure
- Janis McGavin (fl. 2000–present), Australian actor
- Lawrie Hugh McGavin (1861–1932), British surgeon
- Steve McGavin (born 1969), English former professional footballer.
- William McGavin (1773–1832), Scottish businessman, religious figure
