= Mac a' Ghobhainn =

- Language: Scottish Gaelic

Origin
- Meaning: son of the smith
- Region of origin: Scotland

Mac a' Ghobhainn is a Scottish Gaelic surname, meaning "son of the smith". The surname is used as a Scottish Gaelic form of several English-language surnames: MacGowan, and McGowan; and in Glasgow and Moray, the surnames MacGavin and McGavin. The feminine form of Mac a' Ghobhainn is Nic a' Ghobhainn.

== People with the surname ==
- Iain Mac a' Ghobhainn (1928–1998), Scottish writer, known in English as Iain Crichton Smith.
