= Katie Kerwin McCrimmon =

American journalist

Katie Kerwin McCrimmon (born 1965 in Denver, Colorado) is a journalist and former reporter/analyst for ESPN. She won the 1979 National Spelling Bee, representing the Rocky Mountain News, by spelling the word "maculature”.

McCrimmon's spelling bee win won her a full scholarship to Colorado College, where she graduated with a degree in journalism in 1987. After college, she began to work for the Rocky Mountain News and served as their Washington, D.C. correspondent until 1996 and continued at the paper until it closed in 2009. In the early 1990s, CNN began broadcasting the National Spelling Bee and invited her to be a commentator. ESPN2 began broadcasting the contest in 1994, and McCrimmon became their commentator until 2005.

She made a cameo appearance in the 2006 film Akeelah and the Bee.

Katie is currently a writer for UCHealth.

== See also ==
- List of Scripps National Spelling Bee champions

Preceded by Peg McCarthy	Scripps National Spelling Bee winner 1979	Succeeded by Jacques Bailly
