= Dargan, Maryland =

Unincorporated community in Maryland, United States

- Unincorporated community
- Location within Maryland Location within the United States
- Coordinates: 39°22′30″N 77°44′06″W
- Country: United States
- State: Maryland
- County: Washington

Area
  - Total: 0.29 sq mi (0.76 km^{2})
  - Land: 0.29 sq mi (0.76 km^{2})
  - Water: 0 sq mi (0.00 km^{2})
- Elevation: 541 ft (165 m)

Population (2020)
  - Total: 163
  - Density: 552.2/sq mi (213.19/km^{2})
- Time zone: UTC-5 (Eastern (EST))
  - Summer (DST): UTC-4 (EDT)
- ZIP code: 21782
- Area codes: 240 & 301
- GNIS feature ID: 2583605

Dargan is an unincorporated community and census-designated place in Washington County, Maryland, United States. Its population was 165 as of the 2010 census.

== Geography ==
According to the U.S. Census Bureau, the community has an area of 0.295 square miles (0.76 km^{2}), all land.

== Demographics ==
Historical population
Census	Pop.	Note	%±
2020	163		—
U.S. Decennial Census
