= Jimmy McKechnie =

Scottish footballer

Personal information
- Full name: John James McKechnie
- Place of birth: Inverness, Scotland
- Height: 5 ft 10 in (1.78 m)
- Position: Full back

Senior career*
Years	Team	Apps	(Gls)
1919–1920	Newcastle United	0	(0)
1920–1921	Northampton Town	11	(0)
1921–1922	Exeter City	18	(0)
1922–1923	Stockport County	8	(0)
1923–1926	Clapton Orient	47	(0)
1926	Crewe Alexandra	15	(0)
1928	Dundalk GNR	11	(0)
- * Club domestic league appearances and goals

John James McKechnie was a Scottish professional footballer who played as a full back in the Football League for Clapton Orient, Exeter City, Crewe Alexandra, Northampton Town and Stockport County.

== Personal life ==
McKechnie served as a corporal in the Royal Horse Artillery during the First World War.

== Career statistics ==
Appearances and goals by club, season and competition
Club	Season	League			National Cup		Total	
Club	Season	Division	Apps	Goals	Apps	Goals	Apps	Goals
Stockport County	1923–24	Second Division	8	0	0	0	8	0
Dundalk GNR	1928–29	League of Ireland	11	0	0	0	11	0
Career total			19	0	0	0	19	0
