= Nicholson v Haldimand-Norfolk Reg Police Commrs =

- Supreme Court of Canada

Hearing: February 22, 1978 Judgment: October 3, 1978
- Full case name: Arthur Gwyn Nicholson v Haldimand-Norfolk Regional Board of Commissioners of Police
- Citations: [1979] 1 SCR 311, 1978 CanLII 24 (SCC)
- Prior history: On appeal from the Court of Appeal for Ontario
- Ruling: Appeal allowed

Holding
- Holder of a public office is entitled to some degree of procedural fairness and must be treated fairly and not arbitrarily.

Court membership
- Chief Justice: Bora Laskin; Puisne Justices: Ronald Martland, Roland Ritchie, Wishart Spence, Louis-Philippe Pigeon, Brian Dickson, Jean Beetz, Willard Estey, Yves Pratte

Reasons given
- Majority: Laskin C.J., joined by Ritchie, Spence, Dickson, and Estey JJ.
- Dissent: Martland J., joined by Pigeon, Beetz, Pratte JJ.

Laws applied
- Police Act, RSO 1970, c 351; Regional Municipality of Haldimand-Norfolk Amendment Act, 1973 (Ont), c 155, s 75

Nicholson v Haldimand-Norfolk Reg Police Commrs, [1979] 1 SCR 311, is a leading decision of the Supreme Court of Canada in Canadian administrative law. The decision was a landmark reform of administrative law, in which the Court significantly increased the degree of court intervention on procedural grounds.

The Court stated that procedural fairness exists on a continuum and that parties are entitled to a certain degree of it based on the setting and their circumstances. Prior to this decision, procedural fairness only applied to tribunals that were classified as "judicial" or "quasi-judicial".

== Background ==
Nicholson was employed for a period of 15 months by the regional police of Haldimand County when he was terminated without any reason given. The employer claimed that the Police Act allowed them to dismiss him at will, as he was still within an 18-month probationary period of employment. Nicholson, however, argued that he had a common law right to be treated fairly and be notified of the reasons for his termination.

The issue before the Supreme Court of Canada was whether Nicholson's employers were entitled to terminate him without a hearing and without any reasons given.

== Opinion of the Court ==
A majority Court found that Nicholson was entitled to a common law duty of fairness and so should have been able to make submissions to the employer and should have been notified orally or in writing. This paralleled the UK House of Lords decision in Ridge v Baldwin, which was quoted with approval by Laskin C.J.

Laskin noted the difficulty in classifying decisions as "quasi-judicial" or administrative, which often decided the outcome of cases:

[T]he classification of statutory functions as judicial, quasi-judicial or administrative is often very difficult, to say the least; and to endow some with procedural protection while denying others any at all would work injustice when the results of statutory decisions raise the same serious consequences for those adversely affected, regardless of the classifications of the function in question.

Although Laskin did not explicitly reject the categorization of decisions as administrative or judicial, he extended some of the rules of natural justice into administrative decisions, holding that there is a "general duty of fairness" even in administrative decisions.

In the result, the decision of the Board of Commissioners of Police was quashed and costs were awarded to Nicholson.

== Aftermath ==
The content of the general "duty of fairness" was clarified by the Supreme Court of Canada in Baker v. Canada (Minister of Citizenship and Immigration), where the Court set out a test for determining when certain procedural protections are required.

== See also ==
- Baker v. Canada (Minister of Citizenship and Immigration)
- List of Supreme Court of Canada cases
