= Dorgan =

Dorgan (Ó Deargáin) is an Irish surname, derived from dearg "red" (compare Craoibh Dearg). Notable people with the surname include:

- Byron Dorgan (born 1942), United States senator from North Dakota
- Howard Dorgan (1932–2012), American academic known for his research and writing on religion in Appalachia
- Jerry Dorgan (1856–1891), American baseball player
- Jim Dorgan (born 1930), Australian rules football player
- John L. Dorgan (born 1879), known as Ike Dorgan, American boxing manager, and publicity manager for the Madison Square Garden, founding partner of The Ring magazine
- Joseph "Joe" Dorgan (born 1975), American professional wrestler and personal trainer, best known as Johnny Swinger
- Mike Dorgan (1853–1909), American baseball player
- Patrick Dorgan, Danish singer
- Richard W. Dorgan (1892–1953), American cartoonist
- Seán Dorgan (born 1968), Irish politician
- Tad Dorgan (1877–1929), American cartoonist
- Theo Dorgan (born 1953), Irish poet, writer and lecturer

== See also ==
- Dorgon (1612–1650), Qing dynasty regent
