= Dr. Malcolm Nicholson Farmhouse =

Historic house in Florida, United States

- U.S. National Register of Historic Places
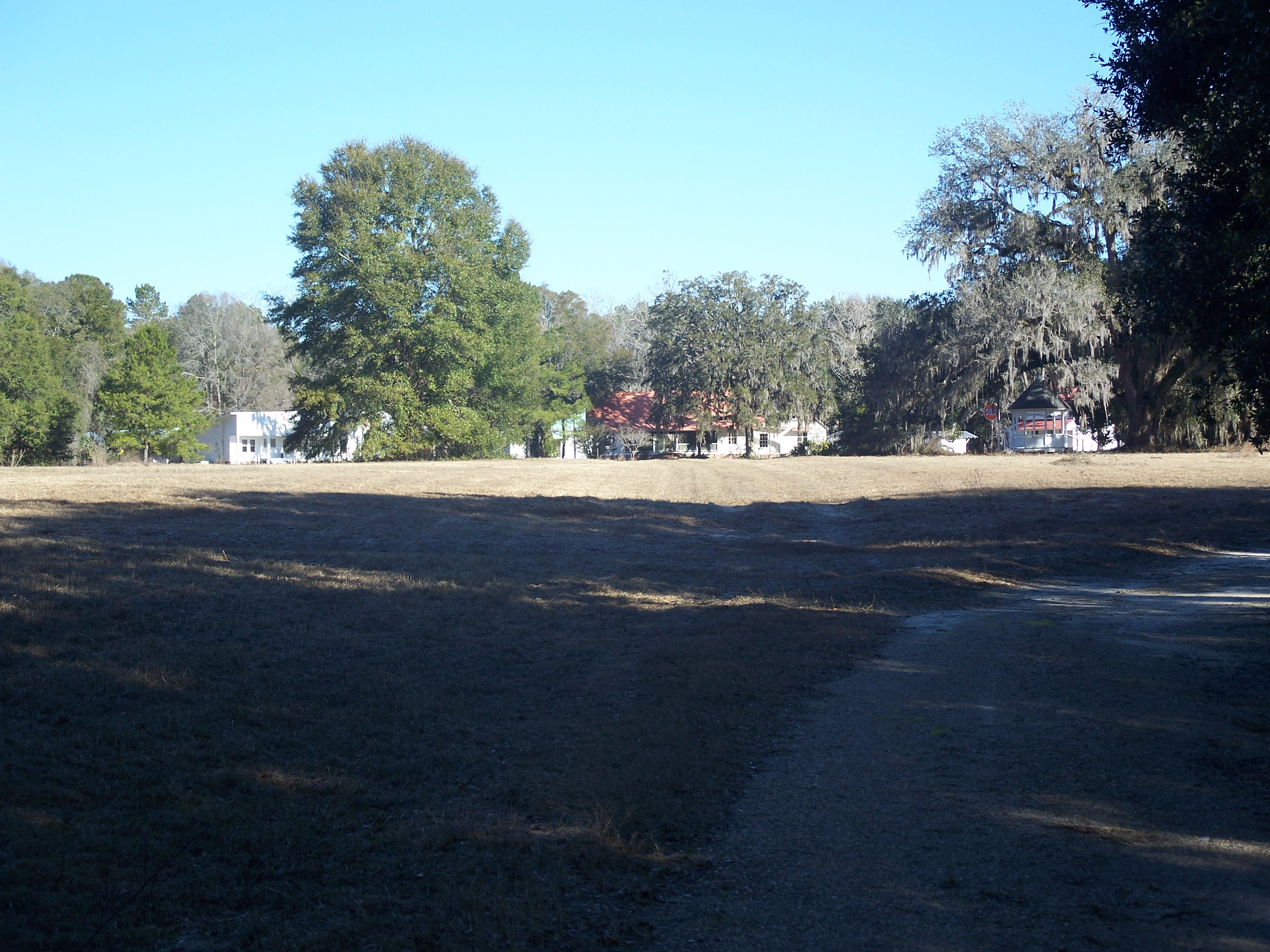

- Location within Florida Location within the United States
- Location: Havana, Florida
- Coordinates: 30°36′39″N 84°28′14″W
- NRHP reference No.: 94001272
- Added to NRHP: October 28, 1994

The Dr. Malcolm Nicholson Farmhouse (also known as the Nicholson Farmhouse or Nicholson Farmhouse Restaurant) is a historic farmhouse in Havana, Florida, United States. It is located at 200 Coca-Cola Avenue, on SR 12 west of Havana. On October 28, 1994, it was added to the U.S. National Register of Historic Places.

Operating as a steakhouse and giftshop, the restaurant and gift shop closed on December 23, 2006, following the death of the plantation's owner in 1999. In 2014, it reopened as White Dog Plantation, a retreat and bed-and-breakfast.
