= Macquarie =

Macquarie may refer to:

== People ==
- Lachlan Macquarie, Governor of the British colony of New South Wales from 1810 to 1821
- Elizabeth Macquarie née Campbell, Lachlan Macquarie's second wife

== Places in Australia ==
=== New South Wales ===
- Division of Macquarie, an electoral district in the Australian House of Representatives
- Lake Macquarie (New South Wales), a lake
  - City of Lake Macquarie, a local government area surrounding Lake Macquarie
- Macquarie County, one of the 141 Cadastral divisions
  - Port Macquarie, a city in Macquarie County
- Macquarie Fields, New South Wales, a suburb of Sydney
- Macquarie Park, New South Wales, a suburb of Sydney
  - Macquarie Centre, a regional shopping centre located in Macquarie Park
- Macquarie River, an inland river
  - Macquarie Marshes Nature Reserve
- Macquarie Street, Sydney, a street in Sydney

=== Australian Capital Territory ===
- Macquarie, Australian Capital Territory, a suburb of Canberra

=== Tasmania ===
- Macquarie Island, in the Southern Ocean
- Macquarie Heads, Tasmania, a locality

== Businesses ==
- Macquarie Group, an Australian company, composed of diversified financial services
- Nine Radio, formerly Macquarie Media, an Australian company operating radio stations nationally
- Macquarie Technology Group, an Australian telecommunications company, specialising in voice, data, mobile and hosting services for commercial and government business
- Macquarie University, a university in Sydney, Australia
  - Macquarie Business School
  - Macquarie University Hospital

== Other uses ==
- Macquarie Lighthouse, a lighthouse in the suburb of Vaucluse, New South Wales, Australia
- Macquarie Dictionary, a dictionary of Australian English

== See also ==
- MacQuarrie
- McQuarrie
