= Ó Deargáin =

Ó Deargáin is a Gaelic-Irish surname, which was found in Leinster and Munster.

It is now anglicised as "Dergan", "Dargan" or "Dorgan".

== See also ==
- Michael Dargan (1929–2023), Irish cricketer.
- William Dargan (1799–1867), the father of Irish railways.
- Theo Dorgan (born 1953), Irish poet, writer and lecturer.
