= Julia Tolmie =

New Zealand legal academic

Julia Tolmie FRSNZ
- Education: Harvard Law School
- Scientific career
- Fields: Domestic violence law
- Workplaces: University of Auckland

Julia Rowena Tolmie FRSNZ is a New Zealand legal academic, and as of 2018 is a full professor at the University of Auckland.

== Academic career ==
After a Bachelor of Laws degree at the University of Auckland and a Master of Laws at Harvard University, Tolmie returned to the University of Auckland, rising to full professor. Registered with the bar in New Zealand and New South Wales, Australia, Tolmie has served on a number of domestic violence-related bodies. She was elected a Fellow of the Royal Society of New Zealand in 2022.

== Selected works ==
- Sheehy, Elizabeth A., Julie Stubbs, and Julia Tolmie. "Defending battered women on trial: The battered woman syndrome and its limitations." (1992).
- Tolmie, Julia. "Corporate social responsibility." UNSWLJ 15 (1992): 268.
- Kaye, Miranda, and Julia Tolmie. "Fathers' rights groups in Australia and their engagement with issues in family law." Australian Journal of Family Law 12, no. 1 (1998): 19–67.
- Kaye, Miranda, and Julia Tolmie. "Discoursing dads: The rhetorical devices of fathers' rights groups." Melb. UL Rev. 22 (1998): 162.
