= Darguen =

Darguen درگوئن
- Village
- Location within Iran
- Coordinates: 26°37′36″N 57°42′27″E
- Country: Iran
- Province: Hormozgan
- County: Bashagard
- Bakhsh: Gowharan
- Rural District: Gowharan

Population (2006)
  - Total: 196
- Time zone: UTC+3:30 (IRST)
  - Summer (DST): UTC+4:30 (IRDT)

Darguen (Persian: درگوئن, also romanized as Dargū’en; also known as Dargan, Dargon, and Dargoon) is a village in Gowharan Rural District, Gowharan District, Bashagard County, Hormozgan province, Iran. At the 2006 census, its population was 196, in 40 families.
