= McQuarrie =

- Language: derived from Gaelic: Mac Guaire

Origin
- Meaning: a patronymic form of the Gaelic personal name meaning "proud" or "noble".
- Region of origin: Scotland

Other names
- Variant forms: Macquarie, MacQuarrie

McQuarrie is a family name of Scottish origin. It is an Anglicisation of the Gaelic Mac Guaire, which was a patronymic form of the Gaelic personal name meaning 'proud' or 'noble'.

== People with the family name McQuarrie ==
- Albert McQuarrie (1918–2016), British politician
- Christopher McQuarrie (born 1968), American screenwriter and director
- Ralph McQuarrie (1929–2012) American conceptual designer and futurist
- Stuart McQuarrie (born 1963), Scottish actor
- William Garland McQuarrie (1876–1943), Canadian lawyer and politician

== Related names ==
- Macquarie
- MacQuarrie

== See also ==
- Clan MacQuarrie
