= John McKechnie (footballer) =

Scottish footballer

Personal information
- Full name: John McKechnie
- Place of birth: Scotland
- Position: Right half

Senior career*
Years	Team	Apps	(Gls)
1914	Queen's Park	9	(0)
- * Club domestic league appearances and goals

John McKechnie was a Scottish amateur footballer who played as a right half in the Scottish League for Queen's Park.

== Personal life ==
McKechnie served as private in the Highland Light Infantry during the First World War and was discharged in November 1918 due to an injured arm.

== Career statistics ==
Appearances and goals by club, season and competition
Club	Season	League			Scottish Cup		Other		Total	
Club	Season	Division	Apps	Goals	Apps	Goals	Apps	Goals	Apps	Goals
Queen's Park	1914–15	Scottish First Division	9	0	―		3 (Note: 2 appearances in Glasgow Cup, 1 appearance in War Fund Shield)	0	12	0
Career total			9	0	―		3	0	12	0
