= McGeachie =

The surname McGeachie is an Irish and a Scottish surname. In ancient times the family name in Gaelic was Mac or Mag Eachaidh ('son of Eachaidh').

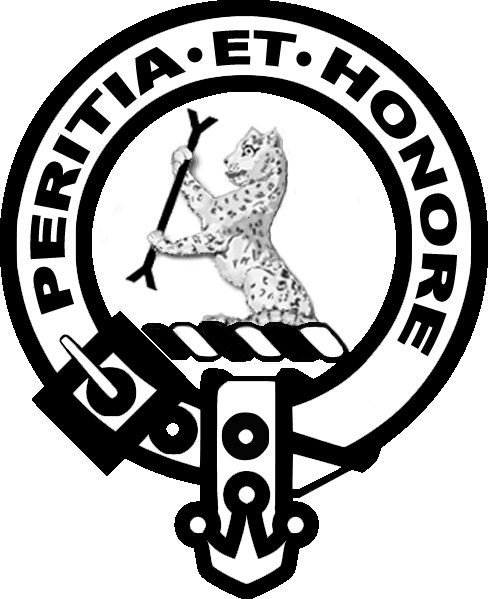
Crest badge: A leopard sejant rampant proper grasping with the forepaws a weaver's ell measure sable. Motto: Peritia et Honore ('Skill and Honour').

== Surname origins ==
MacGeachie, MacGeachy, MacKeachie. From Irish Mag Eachaidh, an Ulster variant of Mag Eochadha. M'Gachie in Bordland, 1684. Neil M'Gechie in Portadow, Kilchenzie parish, 1686 (Argyll). Robert M'Keachie in Darnow 1711 (Wigtown). MacKeachie, MacEachaidh. Robert M'Keachie in Darnow, 1711 (Wigtown). In 1684, the name appears as McCeachie, McCheachie, McKeachie, McKeachy (and without Mac as Keachy, Cachie, Ceachie, Kaachie, Kachie, Kechie) (Parish).

MacGahey, the Irish name Eachaid or Eachadha is also derived from a Gaelic word for horse, and is often used interchangeably in the annals for Eochaid or Eochadha. As Eochaid became anglicized as Oghy, Eachaid became anglicised as Aghy and in Edward MacLysaght's write up of MacGahey, he says: Mac Eachaidh. The personal name Eachaidh, anglicized as Aghey, is a variant of the older Eochaidh—Oghy. McGahey is an Ulster name akin to MacCaughey.

According to Patrick Woulfe, McGahey (with its variant MacGaughy etc.) is Mag Eachaidh in Irish, this being another form of Mag Eochadha, McGahey is definitely an Ulster name. Other surnames that, according to Woulfe, stem from Each are MacGagh (mag eacaro), MacGaugh (mag eacada), MacGeagh (mag eacada).

McCaughan an Anglicized form of the Old Gaelic MacEachain, son of Eachain. An Ulster surname, recorded in the Counties of Antrim, Down, Londonderry and Tyrone. Some families of Mc Caughen changed their name to MacCaughey, itself an Anglicized form of the Ulster name Mac Eachaidh, son of the Horseman or Horse Lord.

The Scots names MacGeachie and MacGeachy are also derived from Mag Eochaidh.

McGachy, McGeachy. An anglicized version of the Gaelic 'Mac Eochaidh'. A surname in both Ulster and Scotland. William McGaheye settled in York, Virginia, in 1653, and Alexander McGeachy, from Argyll, emigrated to America around 1783.

MacGeachie, McGachen a version of MacEachan, they derive from the Gaelic MacEachann – "son of Hector". traditionally from Hector, second son of Roderick, 3rd of Macdonald of Clanranald.

Roland MacGahen (del counte de Wiggeton) Wigtown signed the Ragman Rolls of 1291 & 1296 swearing allegiance to Edward I of England.

The McGachen's of Dalquhat or Dalwhat – Alexander McQuuichin of Dalquhat was outlawed in 1528. Pont's Manuscript 1624 gives arms for McGachen of Dalquhat as Or a Dexter hand, Gules. Sir James Balfour, 1st Baronet – Lord Lyon King of Arms (1630–1658), McGahan of Dalqwhat Or, a Hand, Gules. Alexander McGeachie of Dalwhat is mentioned in 1694 kirk session records for Glencairn Dumfriesshire. According to John Corrie, "the third rivulet on the north side is Dalwhat Water where stands the dwelling place of a lineage of the name M'Gachen descendant of one M' Gachen, a private standard-bearer in the Bruce wars, and doth yet continue the name."

== People ==
- Forster Alleyne McGeachy, Conservative Member of Parliament for Honiton, East Devon 1841, and High Sheriff of Hertfordshire 1865.
- George McGeachie, former English and Scottish footballer, played for Dundee from 1956 until 1963 and Darlington from January 1964 until October 1966.
- George McGeachie, former Scottish footballer, played for Dundee from 1977 until 1990. Raith Rovers from 1990 until 1994, then with Stenhousemuir from 1994 to 1997.
- Henry John Leacock McGeachie, Military Medal Sergeant, 2nd Battalion The Seaforth Highlanders, 14 September 1943.
- Hubert Neal McGaughey Jr. a.k.a. Neal McCoy, American country music singer.
- Ian David McGeachy (1948–2009), known professionally as John Martyn, singer and songwriter, collaborated with artists such as Eric Clapton and Phil Collins.
- Jack McGeachey, a Major League Baseball player.
- Meredith McGeachie, Australian actress, born in Toowoomba, Australia, star of film and television with parts in The L Word, Paradise Falls, Stargate Atlantis and many others.
- Michael "Mick" McGahey, Scottish mineworkers leader, National Vice-President of the NUM; came to prominence during the 1984–1985 miners' strike.
- Neil MacEachen of Howbeg in South Uist, father of Jacques MacDonald – Napoleon's celebrated general and Marshal of France in 1809.

== Tartans ==
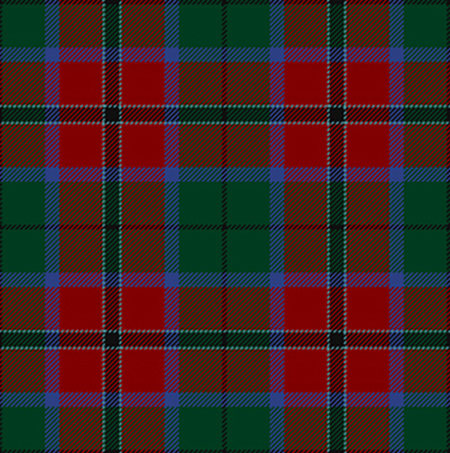
Eachaidh tartan

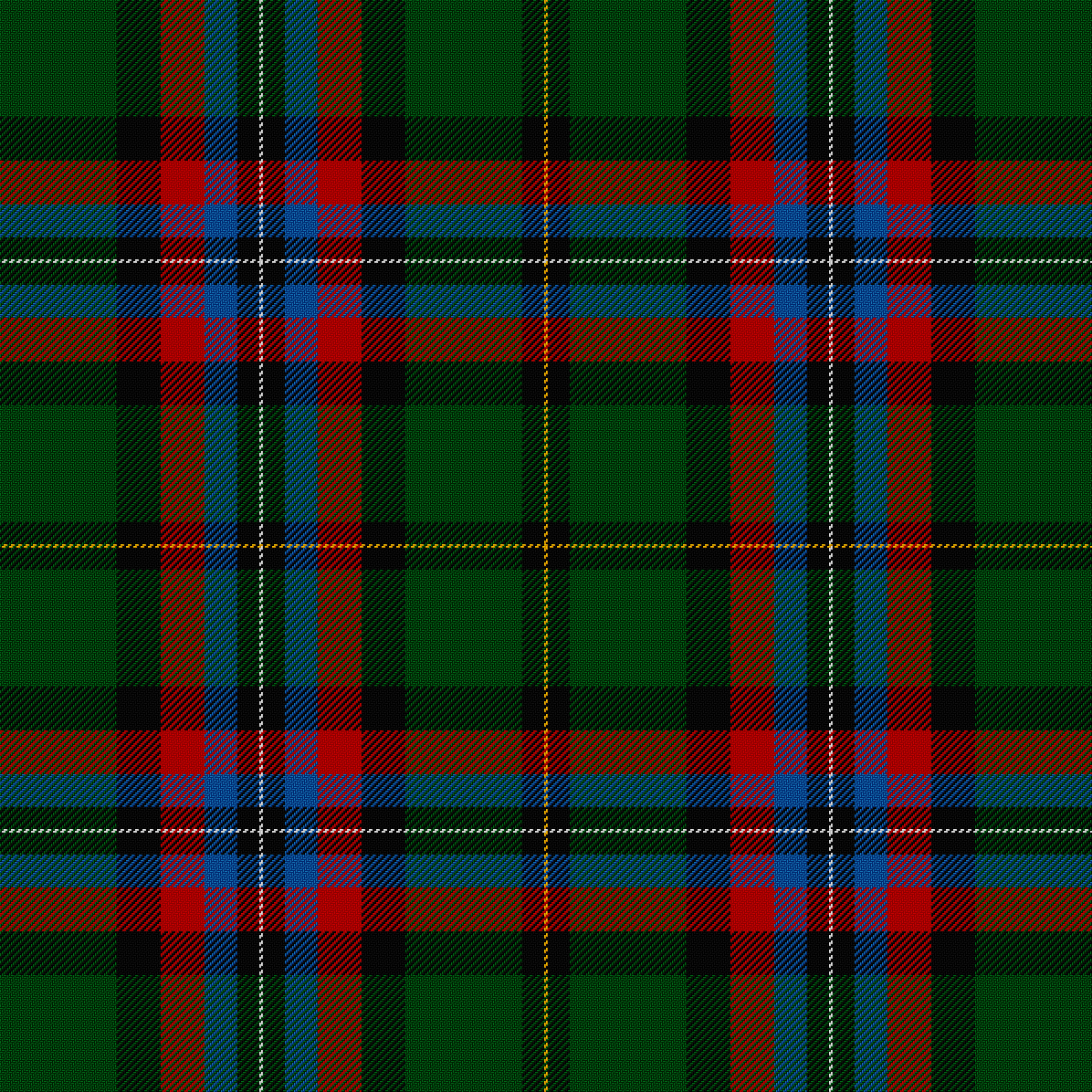
McGeachie tartan

- Eachaidh tartan as registered with the Scottish Register of Tartans, Reg. No 10246.
- McGeachie tartan as registered with the Scottish Register of Tartans, Reg. No. 2883; Scottish Tartans Society STWR Ref. No. 3240; Scottish Tartans Authority ITI Ref. No. 7291.
