= Scottish Gaelic name =

A formal Gaelic language name consists of a given name and a surname. First names are either native or nativized (i.e. borrowed and made to fit the Gaelic sound system). Surnames are generally patronymic, i.e. they refer to a historical ancestor. The form of a surname varies according to whether its bearer is male (e.g. MacDhòmhnaill "MacDonald") or female (e.g. NicDhòmhnaill "MacDonald") though for some surnames the adjectival form of a name such as Dòmhnallach (adjectival form of MacDonald) can be used for both men and women. However, when used in the female form the first letter is lenited (if possible).

== First names ==
Gaelic first names chiefly hail from 5 linguistic layers, Goidelic and 4 others, coinciding with the main languages of contact: Latin, Norse, Anglo-Norman and Scots. Unusually, male first names outnumber female first names by about a factor of 2:1.

=== Goidelic names ===
This layer can be broadly split into three main types:

- descriptive names (nouns or adjectives), e.g. Fionn 'fair, bright', Art 'bear'
- old compounds (names which had fused to the extent of now being opaque); e.g., Dòmhnall "Donald" (*dumnoualos, 'world strength'), Murchadh "Murdo" (*moricatus, 'sea battle')
- compounds, e.g. Donn-slèibhe "Dunlevy" ('brown one of the mountain'), Gille Chrìost "Gilchrist" ('servant of Christ')

The first two categories were no longer productive for the most part towards the end of the Old Irish period but the last type persisted, reinforced by the coinage of ecclesiastical names following Christianization.

=== Norse names ===
Quite a number of names still common hail from the period of Norse contact:

- Somhairle < Sumarliðr
- Tormod < Þórmóðr
- Torcuil < Þórkell, Þórketill
- Ìomhar < Ívarr

=== Anglo-Norman ===
Names from this layer include:

- Sìleas < Giles

=== Scots ===
Scots names which have been borrowed into Gaelic include:

- Eairrdsidh < Archie

=== Latin ===
Names which were borrowed from Latin include:

- Pàdraig < Patricius
- Sìle < Caecilia

=== Borrowing into English/Scots ===
A fair number of Gaelic names were borrowed into English or Scots at different periods (e.g. Kenneth, Duncan, Donald, Malcolm, Calum, Lachlan, Alasdair, Iain, Eilidh), although it can sometimes be difficult to tell if the donor language was Irish or Scottish Gaelic (e.g. Deirdre, Rory, Kennedy, Bridget/Bride, Aiden). On occasion, the same name was borrowed more than once due to misinterpretation of Gaelic morphology. For example, the names Hamish and Mhairi /ˈvɑːri/ are derived from Gaelic Seumas [ˈʃeːməs̪] and Màiri [ˈmaːɾʲɪ] but rather than borrowing the root forms, the English/Scots forms are based on the Gaelic vocative case forms Sheumais [ˈheːmɪʃ] and Mhàiri [ˈvaːɾʲɪ].

Some names which did not acquire currency outside the Gaelic-speaking world were roughly transliterated into English, such as Gorm(sh)uil which is often rendered as "Gormelia".

Others with no cognate were often equated with English/Scots names which bore some similarity to the Gaelic name in order to obtain "English equivalents". This includes Oighrig which was equated with Euphemia or Henrietta, Dìorbhail with Dorothy, Beathag with Rebecca or Sophie.

== Surnames ==
The majority of Gaelic surnames in the Highlands and western parts are patronymic in nature and of Goidelic extraction, although epithets, geography or occupation and borrowings also occur in some surnames. However, many surnames are derived from topographical features or place names, Such surnames include Caddenhead/Cionnchadach, Cadell/Cadalach, Cleghorne/Clagarnach, Dalzell/Dailghileach, Dalrimple/Ruimpealach, Elphin/Ailbhinneach, Inverbervie/Biorbhach, Kelty/Cailtidheach, Learmonth/Learmonadhach, Ochiltree/Ochailtreabhach and many more.

Campbell/Caimbeul "crooked mouth" and Cameron/Camshron "crooked nose" are two examples of surnames based on epithets, while Fraser/Frisealach is an example of a borrowing (from Anglo-French Fresel).

The usage of patronymic surnames was much more varied than is generally assumed. Historically, clan surnames were used by the descendants or dependants of an ancestor but not generally by everyone in the clan territory. Only with the advent of a non-Gaelic speaking administration were clan surnames applied en-masse to people in a clan's territory.

=== Formation ===
Patronymic surnames for men feature either the word mac "son" (e.g. MacDhòmhnaill, lit. son of Donald) or the nominalizing suffix -ach (e.g. Dòmhnallach). In the case of women, the word nic is used, a shortening of the full phrase nighean mhic "daughter of the son of"). (Note: East Sutherland Gaelic uses mac for both male and female surnames.) Various other morphological changes (such as lenition or slenderization) may apply in Gaelic, so the surname MacDonald for example may appear as MacDhòmhnaill, MhacDhòmhnaill, MhicDhòmhnaill, NicDhòmhnaill depending on the grammatical context.

In Classical Gaelic culture, clans could also feature the word ua (alt. ó) "grandchild, descendant" (spelled ogha /oə/ in Modern Gaelic), e.g. Ua Dhuibhne "Duibhne's descendant", the original surname of the Campbells (Duibhne was a Celtic goddess). In speaking, ua/ó in names became reduced to [ə], as happened also in Northern Irish and Manx, and disappeared from Anglicised forms. With the break-up of Classical Gaelic culture, ua/ó disappeared from Scottish surnames, sometimes replaced by mac.

As a result of misspellings, one Gaelic surname often corresponds to numerous English/Scots forms, e.g. MacDhonnchaidh "son of Duncan" may appear as: Donagh(y), Donnagh, Dono(u)gh, MacConachie, MacConachy, MacConaghy, MacConchy, MacConechie, MacConkey, MacConnachie, MacConnechie, MacConnichie, MacConochie, MacConoughy, MacDona, MacDonachie, MacDonachy, MacDonaghy, MacDonaugh, MacDonnach, MacDonnagh, MacDonnoghie, MacDonogh, MacDonoghue, MacDonough, MacDunphy, MacKonochie, MacOnachie, MacOnechy, MacOnochie, Donohue or Donohoe (ignoring the Mac/Mc variation).

Scottish Gaelic does not put a space between the Mac/Nic and the second element, whereas in Irish, there is a space:

Scots Gaelic	Irish	English/Scots
MacAonghais	Mac Aonghasa	MacInnes et al.
MacDhòmhnaill	Mac Domhnaill	MacDonald et al.
MacEòghainn	Mac Eoghain	MacEwen et al.
MacMhàrtainn	Mac Máirtín	MacMartin et al.

== Nicknames ==
Nicknames (Scottish Gaelic: far-ainm, frith-ainm) in Gaelic operate similarly to those in other languages and usually indicate a physical characteristic, an occupation, a location or an incident the person is associated and so forth.

Some examples

=== Character traits ===
- Caitrìona na h-Aonar ("Catriona on her own"), a woman who enjoyed doing everything on her own

=== Geographical references ===
- An t-Arcach ("The Orcadian"), a man who used to fish around the Orkney Islands in his youth
- Bliadhnach Phabaigh ("Pabbay yearling"), a woman who had been a year old when the Isle of Pabbay was cleared of people

=== Humorous names ===
- Calum Seòladair ("Calum Sailor"), an unusual name for a woman who was in the habit of wearing a sailor's cap
- Clag a' Bhaile ("The town bell"), a man with a very loud voice

=== Occupation ===
- Ailean Còcaire ("Alan the cook"), a man who was employed at one time as the cook at Ormacleit Castle
- Aonghas a' Bhancair ("Angus the banker"), a man who was employed in a bank in Nova Scotia
- Donchadh Clachair ("Duncan the stonemason" but always presented in English as the literal translation, "Duncan Stoner"), a known 19th and 20th century resident of Achadh an Droighinn/Auchindrain township in Argyll, Scotland: used for Duncan Munro, d. 1937.
- Domnhall Rothach ("Donald on wheels"), used in Argyll in the 1920s to describe a Donald MacCallum who ran a mobile grocer's shop in a van

=== Physical characteristics ===
- Bodach a' Chnatain ("The old man of the cold")
- Calum na Coise ("Calum of the leg"), a man who had a short leg
- Dòmhnall na Cluaise ("Donald of the ear"), a man who is said to have lost an ear in a fight
- Raibeart Bhan ("Fair Robert"), a man called Robert with light-coloured hair

=== Other ===
- An Caillteanach ("The lost one"), a man who had become lost, causing the entire village to spend the night looking for him
- Ìomhair a' Bhogha Mhaide ("Ivor of the wooden bow"), a renowned archer and one time resident of Pabay
- Bell a' Phuill ("Bella who lives by the muddy place"), used for Isabella McCallum (1822–1915) of Achadh an Droighinn/Auchindrain township in Argyll, Scotland: her house was close to the ford where the cattle crossed the burn

== Identifying names ==
Due to the relative paucity of names and surnames in Gaelic, the official name of a person (i.e. first name plus a surname, in Gaelic or English/Scots) is rarely used in Gaelic speaking communities as, with a small number of surnames usually predominating in an area, there are usually several people who go by the same combination, for example John MacLeod might apply to several people in the same village. In everyday life, this is usually solved by using the first name of a man, followed by the first name of his father in the genitive case or by using the first name plus an epithet. So a man called James (Seumas) with a father called Neil (Niall) would become Seumas Nèill or Seumas a' Ghlinne ("James of the glen"). In the case of married women, the convention is normally to use bean ("wife") plus the husband's first name and father's first name, in our example resulting in Bean Sheumais Nèill ("the wife of Neil's James"). The (fictitious) family tree below illustrates this custom.

Catrìona	Niall MacLeod
(legal name) Mary-Kate MacAulay (technically) Màiri Ceit NicAmhlaigh (known as) Bean Sheumais Nèill ("wife of Neil's James") (nicknamed) Bròg miamh ("miaowing shoe")	(legal name) James MacLeod (technically) Seumas MacLeòid (known as) Seumas Nèill ("Neil's James") (nicknamed) Seumas a' Ghlinne ("James of the glen")
(legal name) Donald MacLeod (technically) Dòmhnall MacLeòid (known as) Dòmhnall Sheumais Nèill (Neil's James' Donald) (nicknamed) Dòmhnall a' Bhanca ("Donald the banker")	(legal name) Fiona MacLeod (technically) Fionnghal NicLeòid (known as) Fionnghal Sheumais Nèill (Neil's James's Fiona) (nicknamed) Fionnghal Ruadh ("red-haired Fiona")	(legal name) Colin MacLeod (technically) Cailean MacLeòid (known as) Cailean Sheumais Nèill (Neil's James's Colin) (nicknamed) Cailean Bodhar ("deaf Colin")

Historically, such an identifying name would take the mac "son" element, e.g. Dòmhnall mac Sheumais mac Nèill ("Donald son of James son of Neill") but in modern usage, this is usually dropped, resulting in Dòmhnall Sheumais Nèill.

Identifying names sometimes use female reference points, for example if a local woman marries an outsider, this may result in the children being identified via the mother. Dòmhnall Chiorstan ("Kirsten's Donald") for instance would indicate a son called Donald with a mother called Kirsten.

== See also ==
- Celtic onomastics
- Icelandic names, which still use patronymics
- Irish name
- Russian patronymics
- List of Scottish Gaelic given names
- List of Scottish Gaelic surnames
- Scottish toponymy
- Welsh surnames
- Scottish names in Ulster
