= Dargan (surname) =

Dargan is a surname. Notable people with the surname include:

- Ash Dargan, indigenous Australian didgeridoo player
- Edmund Strother Dargan, U.S. and Confederate representative from Alabama
- George W. Dargan, U.S. representative from South Carolina
- Karl Dargan, American amateur boxer
- Michael Dargan (1929–2023), Irish cricketer
- Olive Tilford Dargan, American author
- Troy Dargan (1997–2023), Australian rugby player
- William Dargan, Irish engineer
