= MacBrayne =

MacBrayne may refer to:

- Caledonian MacBrayne, a state-owned operator of passenger and vehicle ferries between the mainland and islands surrounding Scotland
- David MacBrayne, holding company that owns Caledonian MacBrayne, traded in its own right until 1973
