= MacQuarrie =

- Language: derived from Gaelic: Mac Guaire.

Origin
- Meaning: a patronymic form of the Gaelic personal name meaning 'proud' or 'noble'.
- Region of origin: Scotland

Other names
- Variant forms: Macquarie, McQuarrie, Macquarrie

MacQuarrie is a family name of Scottish origin. It is an Anglicisation of the Gaelic Mac Guaire, which was a patronymic form of the Gaelic personal name meaning 'proud' or 'noble'.

== Notable people with the family name MacQuarrie ==
- Albert MacQuarrie, silent film actor
- Bob MacQuarrie, Canadian politician
- Frank MacQuarrie, American actor
- Heath MacQuarrie, Canadian politician
- John Macquarrie, British philosopher and theologian
- Melanie Morse MacQuarrie, Canadian actress
- Murdock MacQuarrie, actor
- Ralph Angus McQuarrie, American conceptual designer and illustrator
- Robert H. MacQuarrie, Canadian politician

== Other ==
- Clan MacQuarrie, a Scottish clan.

== Related names ==
- Macquarie
- McQuarrie
- Macquarrie
