= McKillop (surname) =

MacKillop, McKillop
- Language: Gaelic

Origin
- Meaning: son of Filib
- Region of origin: Scotland

Other names
- Variant forms: Filib; Philip; MacFhilib; MacPhilip

McKillop is an English language surname derived from the Gaelic MacFhilib, meaning "son of Filib" (a Gaelic form of Philip).

There were families of MacKillops on the Isle of Arran; there were also families in Argyll who were a sept of the MacDonalds of Glencoe; others in Inverness-shire were a sept of the McDonnells of Keppoch. MacKillops were also standard-bearers to the Campbells of Dunstaffnage, in Argyll. The MacKillops of Berneray, North Uist are known in Scottish Gaelic as MacPhàic; they were associated with the MacLeods.

The McKillops migrated to the northern Glens of Antrim during the Plantation of Ulster in the early 17th century. The surname is common around Loughguile, Cushendall and Ballycastle.

== List of persons with the surname McKillop ==
- A. B. McKillop (born 1946), Chancellor's Professor and chair of the history department of Carleton University in Ottawa
- Beth McKillop (1953-2026), British sinologist and Koreanist
- Bob McKillop (born 1950), head coach of the men's basketball team at Davidson College
- Don McKillop (1928–2005), English actor
- Heather McKillop (born 1953), Canadian-American archaeologist
- Hugh Cummings McKillop (1872–1937), Canadian politician
- Lee Mack (real name: Lee Gordon McKillop) (born 1968), English stand-up comedian
- Michael McKillop (born 1990), Irish athlete
- Patricia McKillop (born 1956), former field hockey player from Zimbabwe
- Rob McKillop, bassist who once played for the thrash metal band Exodus
- Scott McKillop (born 1986), American football linebacker for the San Francisco 49ers
- Tom McKillop (born 1943), CEO
- Tom McKillop (footballer) (1917–1984), Scottish footballer
- William McKillop (1860–1909), Irish nationalist

== List of persons with the surname MacKillop or Mackillop ==
- Douglas Mackillop (1891–1959), British diplomat
- Mary MacKillop (1842–1909), Australian saint of the Catholic Church
- Rob MacKillop (born 1959), Scottish musician
