= John Carter =

John Carter may refer to:

== Business ==
- John Carter (businessman) (born 1961/62), British businessman, CEO of Travis Perkins
- John Carter (insurance executive) (born 1937), chairman of Commercial Union (1994–1998)
- John W. Carter (died 1895), partner in Carter's Ink Company in Massachusetts

== Arts and entertainment ==
- John Carter (actor) (1927–2015), American actor and director
- Carter (artist) (John Carter, born 1970), American artist and film director
- John Carter (writer) (1905–1975), English author, book collector and bookseller
- John Carter (film editor) (1922–2018), American film editor
- John Carter (mouth artist) (1815–1850), disabled English artist
- John Carter (sound engineer) (1907–1982), American film audio engineer
- John Charles Carter, birth name of actor Charlton Heston

=== Media ===
- John Carter (film), a 2012 film about the Burroughs character on Mars
- Princess of Mars, a 2009 direct-to-DVD film retitled in 2012 to John Carter of Mars
- John Carter, Warlord of Mars, a Marvel Comics series created in 1977
- John Carter, Warlord of Mars (role-playing game), 1978
- John Carter: Warlord of Mars (board game), 1979

=== Music ===
- John Carter (1832–1916), English organist and composer, brother of William Carter
- John Carter (jazz musician) (1929–1991), American jazz musician
- John Carter (English musician) (born 1942), English singer-songwriter
- John S. Carter (1945–2011), American music executive, producer, and songwriter, often known simply as Carter
- Johnny Carter (singer) (1934–2009), American singer and member of the Dells and the Flamingos

=== Fictional characters ===
- John Carter of Mars, a character from the classic science fiction series of novels by Edgar Rice Burroughs
- John Carter (ER), a character from the television series ER played by Noah Wyle
- John Carter (Little House)
- Johnny Carter (EastEnders), a character from the television series EastEnders

== Military ==
- John Carter (Royal Navy officer) (1785–1863), Irish born Royal Navy officer during the French Revolutionary and Napoleonic Wars
- John C. Carter (U.S. naval officer) (1805–1870), U.S. naval officer including during the American Civil War
- John C. Carter (1837–1864), Confederate general in the American Civil War
- John J. Carter (1842–1917), Irish officer who fought in the American Civil War

== Politics ==
=== United States ===
- John Carter (South Carolina politician) (1792–1850), U.S. representative from South Carolina
- John Carter (Texas politician) (born 1941), U.S. representative from Texas
- John A. Carter (Virginia politician) (1808–1895), represented Loudoun County in both houses of the Virginia General Assembly and 2 conventions
- John R. Carter (diplomat) (1864–1944), U.S. diplomat and banker
- John Prentiss Carter (1840–1925), lieutenant governor of Mississippi
- John Carter Sr. (1613–1670), English merchant and politician in Virginia, founder of the Carter Family of Virginia
- John Carter Jr. (died 1690), son of John Carter Sr. and member of the Virginia House of Burgesses
- John Carter (Virginia colonial secretary) (1696–1742), Virginia planter, lawyer, merchant and politician
- John Carter, U.S. Air Force veteran and candidate for the U.S. House of Representatives in North Carolina in 2010

=== United Kingdom ===
- John Carter (died 1408), MP for Scarborough
- John Carter (died 1432), MP for Scarborough
- John Carter (Roundhead) (died 1676), English Parliamentary soldier and politician
- John Carter (mayor of Portsmouth) (1741–1808), English merchant and mayor

=== Other countries ===
- John Chilton Lambton Carter (1816–1872), New Zealand politician
- John Carter (Australian politician) (1893–1971), Australian politician
- John Carter (New Zealand politician) (born 1950), New Zealand politician and mayor of the Far North District
- John A. Carter (Newfoundland politician) (1933–2017), politician and farmer in Newfoundland, Canada
- John Carter (ambassador) (1919–2005), Guyanese politician, lawyer and diplomat

== Religion ==
- John S. Carter (Latter Day Saints) (1792–1834), early American leader in the Latter Day Saint movement
- John Carter (Christadelphian) (1899–1962), editor of The Christadelphian from 1937 to 1962
- John Carter (evangelist), Seventh-day Adventist evangelist
- John Carter (priest), English Anglican priest
- John Carter the elder (1554–1630s), English divine
- John Carter the younger (died 1655), English divine

== Sports ==
- John Carter (Nottingham cricketer) (fl. 1789), English cricketer
- John Carter (cricketer, born 1935), former English cricketer
- John Carter (cricketer, born 1963), former English cricketer
- John Carter (ice hockey) (born 1963), professional ice hockey player
- John Carter (pole vaulter) (born 1944), American pole vaulter, 1966 NCAA outdoor runner-up for the West Virginia Mountaineers track and field team
- Johnny Carter (footballer) (1894–1960), Australian footballer
- Jock Carter (1910–1992), English footballer

== Other ==
- John Carter (architect) (1748–1817), English draughtsman and architect
- John Coates Carter (1859–1927), English architect
- John A. Carter (architect) (1924–2017), American architect in Nashua, New Hampshire
- John Carter (smuggler) (1770–1807), "King of Prussia", smuggler operating out of Prussia Cove, Cornwall
- Lynching of John Carter (died 1927), African-American man murdered by a white mob
- John Carter (police officer) (1882–1944), assistant commissioner of the London Metropolitan Police, 1938–1940
- John Franklin Carter (1897–1967), American journalist
- John Cain Carter (born 1966), American rancher and environmentalist
- John Carter (endocrinologist) (born 1944), Australian medical academic and endocrinologist
- John Carter (printer) (1745–1814), American printer and newspaper publisher
- John Mack Carter (1928–2014), American publishing industry figure
- John Corrie Carter (1839–1927), English barrister, high sheriff, author and sportsman
- John Carter (1942–2000), founder of Carters Steam Fair
- John Galen Carter (1891–1941), American anthropologist

== See also ==
- Jack Carter (disambiguation)
- Jonathan Carter (disambiguation)
- Jon Carter (born 1970), English musician
- Jon Carter (American football) (born 1965)
