= George Campbell of Inverneill =

British general (1803–1882)

General George Campbell CB
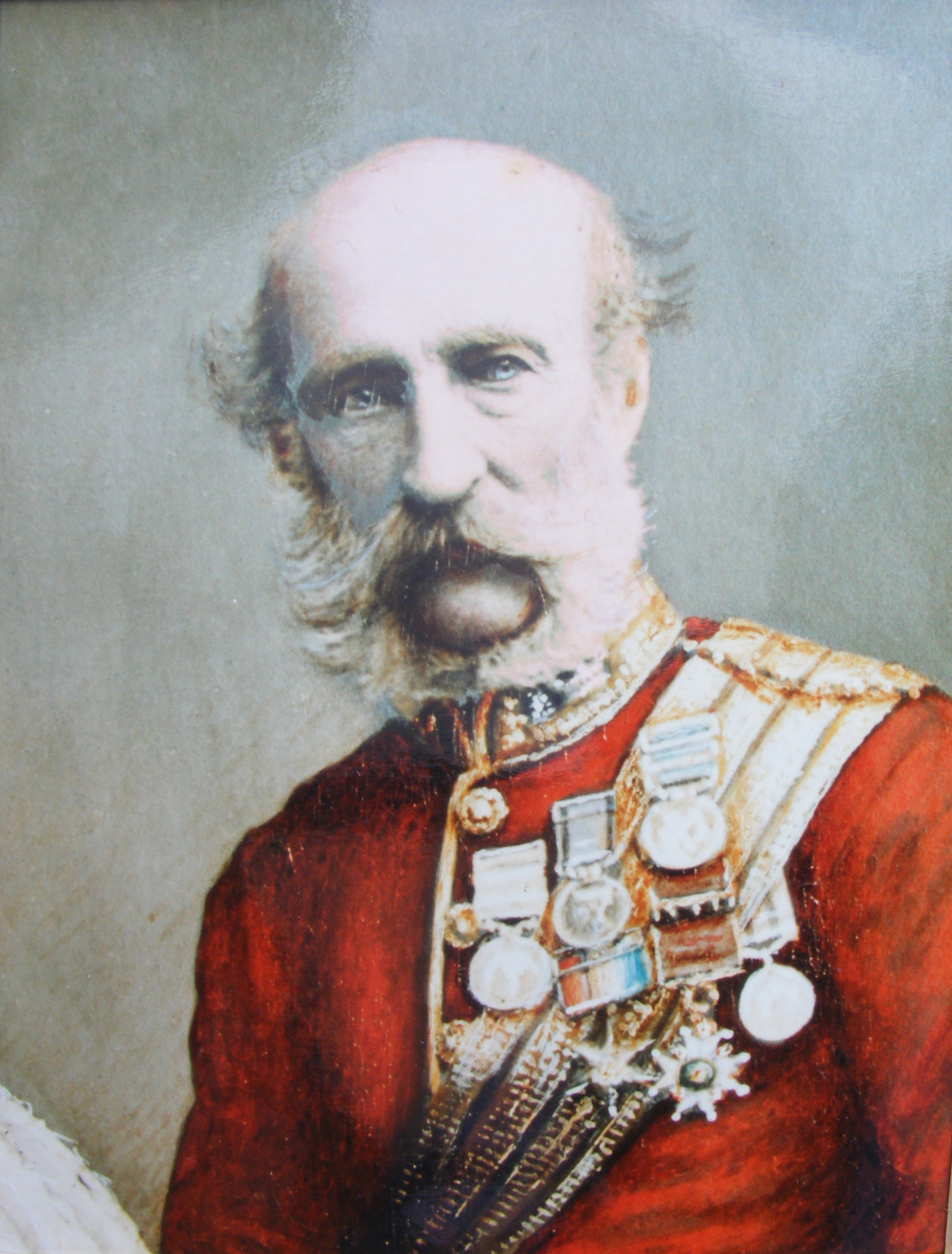
- Born: 1803; East Indies
- Died: 25 April 1882 (aged 78–79); No. 1, Byng Place, Gordon Square, London
- Relatives: Major-General Sir Archibald Campbell (great-uncle); Major-General George Carter-Campbell (grandson); Colonel Duncan Carter-Campbell of Possil (great-gandson)
- Military career
- Allegiance: United Kingdom
- Branch: British Army
- Service years: 1823–1874
- Rank: General
- Commands: Royal Artillery; I Brigade, Royal Horse Artillery; 7th (Meerut) Division; Army Group Royal Artillery; 3rd (Lahore) Division; Artillery Division Cawnpore
- Conflicts: Mutiny at Banares; First Anglo-Burmese War; First Anglo-Sikh War; Punjab campaign of 1848–49; Battle of Mudki; Siege of Cawnpore; Gwalior campaign Battle of Sobraon; Battle of Ferozeshah
- Awards: Companion of the Order of the Bath

General George Campbell of Inverneill, CB (1803–1882) was commandant of the Royal Artillery and served in the East India Company.

== Early life and family ==
George Campbell was born in 1803, the third son of Duncan Campbell of Inverneill B.C.S. and his wife, Elizabeth Cooper. He was a grandson of James Campbell, 3rd of Tuerechan (8th Chief of Tearlach, descended from Clan Campbell of Craignish) and great-nephew of Major-General Sir Archibald Campbell, father-in-law to Colonel Thomas Tupper Carter-Campbell of Possil and grandfather to General George Tupper Campbell Carter-Campbell. He had a son and two daughters with his wife Susan "Black Beauty" Campbell of Possil (daughter of Colonel Alexander Campbell of Possil).

There have been few more distinguished and adventurous Anglo-Indian officers in our Presidential armies than the late General Campbell C.B, K.A. and few smarter officers ever wore the "jacket 3". He passed all his regimental service in the Bengal Horse Artillery; and, as soldier or sportsman, none was better known in India than he.

— The Calcutta Review

== Military career ==
Campbell joined the Royal Horse Artillery of the Bengal Army in 1822 (one of the three presidencies of the British Raj) and first served in the First Anglo-Burmese War of 1824–1826 including the Battle of Donabew (March–April 1825) against the forces of General Maha Bandula.

In 1840 Campbell was appointed chief of staff to the Lieutenant-Governor of the North-Western Provinces, Lord Auckland. Three years later he fought in the Gwalior campaign against the Marathan forces in 1843, for which he was presented with the Gwalior Star. At the Battle of Punniar he was awarded the bronze star and the rank of brevet major for his efforts in driving the 12,000 Marathan troops from the high ground near Mangore.

Campbell was posted to serve in the First Anglo-Sikh War (The Sutlej Campaign) of 1845–46 and achieved rank of lieutenant colonel. He fought in the battles of Moodkee, Sobraon and Ferozeshah and was subsequently awarded the Sutlej Medal. Two years later, the Second Anglo-Sikh War out-broke and Campbell was placed in command of the artillery division "Lahore" where he was awarded the Punjab Medal.

In 1853 Campbell had been put in charge of the Artillery Divisions ""Agra", "Meerut" and Cawnpore and in 1854 was made commander of I Brigade, Royal Horse Artillery. In 1856, he was promoted to brigadier general and stationed at Rawal Pindee. The following year, the Indian Mutiny commenced which Campbell served through including the Siege of Cawnpore and was presented with the Indian Mutiny Medal. In the second year of the mutiny Campbell was promoted to major-general and commanded the forces at Banares.

Amongst the East India Company, Campbell was known to be an outstanding sportsman and a skilled horseman whose overly adventurous nature could become trying to members of his divisional staff. While at Banares, he killed his hundredth tiger.

== Later life ==
After 1863, Campbell retired from active service (though remained serving the East India Company) and was awarded the Distinguished Service Pension in 1865. Two years later he was appointed Companion of the Order of the Bath and in 1868 was promoted to lieutenant-general.

He returned to England in 1871 and three years later was given full rank of general and made commander of the Royal Artillery.

On 25 April 1882, at the age of 78, Campbell died at his house No. 1, Byng Place, Gordon Square, London. He is buried at the mausoleum on the grounds of Inverneill House with his brother Major-General Archibald Lorne Campbell who died a year later.
