= Thomas Tupper Carter-Campbell of Possil =

British Army officer (1838-1900)

Thomas Tupper Carter-Campbell of Possil JP
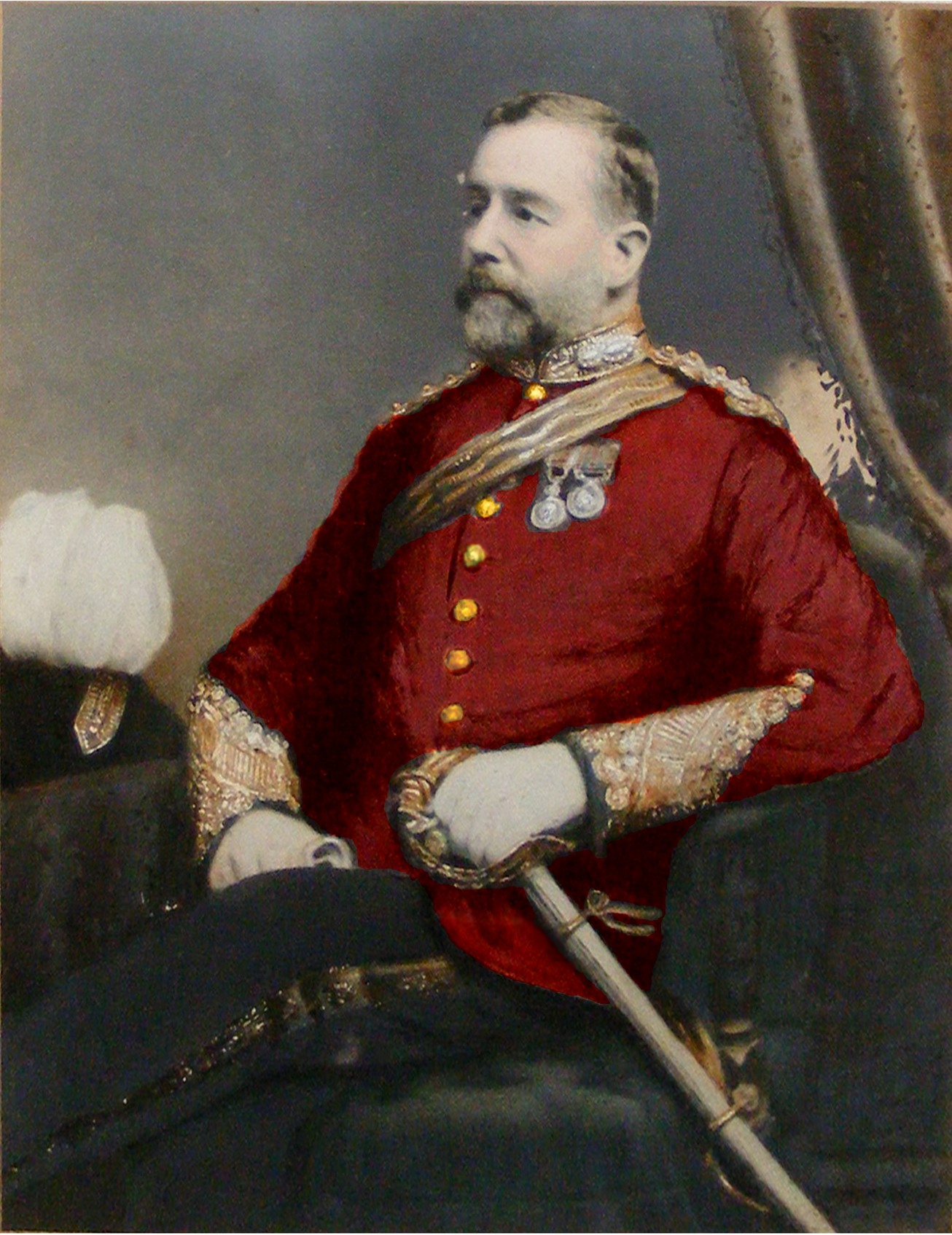
- Born: 15 September 1838
- Died: 14 January 1900 (aged 61)
- Relatives: Thomas Carter MP (1690–1763), Admiral John Carter, General George Carter-Campbell; Colonel Duncan Carter-Campbell of Possil
- Military career
- Allegiance: United Kingdom
- Branch: British Army
- Service years: 1853–1887
- Rank: Colonel; Justice of the Peace; Chief of Staff
- Commands: Bengal Engineer Group; Great Trigonometric Survey; Honourable East India Company
- Conflicts: Sikkim Expedition (1861); Umbeyla Campaign; 1868 Expedition to Abyssinia

Colonel Thomas Tupper Carter-Campbell of Possil (15 September 1838 – 14 January 1900) was a British soldier.

== Biography ==
Thomas Tupper Carter was born on 15 September 1838, the third son of Admiral John Carter RN of Castlemartin and his wife, Julia Adery Georges. He was a grandson of Thomas Carter MP of Castlemartin.

=== Education ===
He first attended Cheltenham College. In 1853, he entered the Royal School of Military Engineering as an Ensign and was given the provisionary rank of lieutenant on 13 August 1853. He subsequently attended Addiscombe Military Seminary, where officers were trained for service with the army of the East India Company. He was examined and qualified as an engineer office on 11 December 1857, with the rank of second lieutenant.

In late 1857 Carter joined the company's Royal Bengal Engineers and was promoted to first lieutenant on 27 August 1858.

After the Indian Mutiny of 1857–1858, the army of the East India Company was abolished, most of it becoming the Indian Army. However, the Royal Bengal Engineers were amalgamated with the Royal Engineers of the British Army.

=== Military career ===
In 1861, Carter served in the Sikkim Expedition. In 1863, he commanded the engineer forces in the Umbeyla Campaign. On 21 April 1864, Carter was appointed a 3rd Grade surveyor in Great Trigonometric Survey of India. Later that year, on 15 September, he was married to Emily Georgina Campbell of Possil, the daughter of General George Campbell of Inverniell and he adopted the new name of Carter-Campbell of Possil.

Carter served in the 1868 Expedition to Abyssinia where, upon the death of H. W. Garnault, he was promoted to captain on 13 September 1870.

On 1 October 1877 Carter was promoted to major in the Royal Engineers, and made lieutenant colonel on 11 December 1886. He retired in 1887 upon receiving the honorary rank of colonel.

=== In retirement ===
Carter lived for a time at Siam House, Weymouth, Dorset. In 1893 he was granted renewed arms by the Lord Lyon King of Arms, and formally changed his name to Carter-Campbell of Possil.

He subsequently lived with his wife and children at the family residence of Fascadale, in the parish of South Knapdale in Strathclyde (now Ardrishaig, Lochgilphead, Argyllshire). He held office for the Lord Lieutenant of Argyllshire and was made Justice of the Peace.

On 14 January 1900 Carter died at Fascadale, aged 61. He had six children. His son George Carter-Campbell served in World War I and became a major general.

== See also ==
- Carter-Campbell of Possil
- General George Carter-Campbell
- The Possil Estate, Lanarkshire
- East India Company
