= Thomas Carter (1690–1763) =

Anglo-Irish politician (1690–1763)

The Right Honourable Thomas Carter
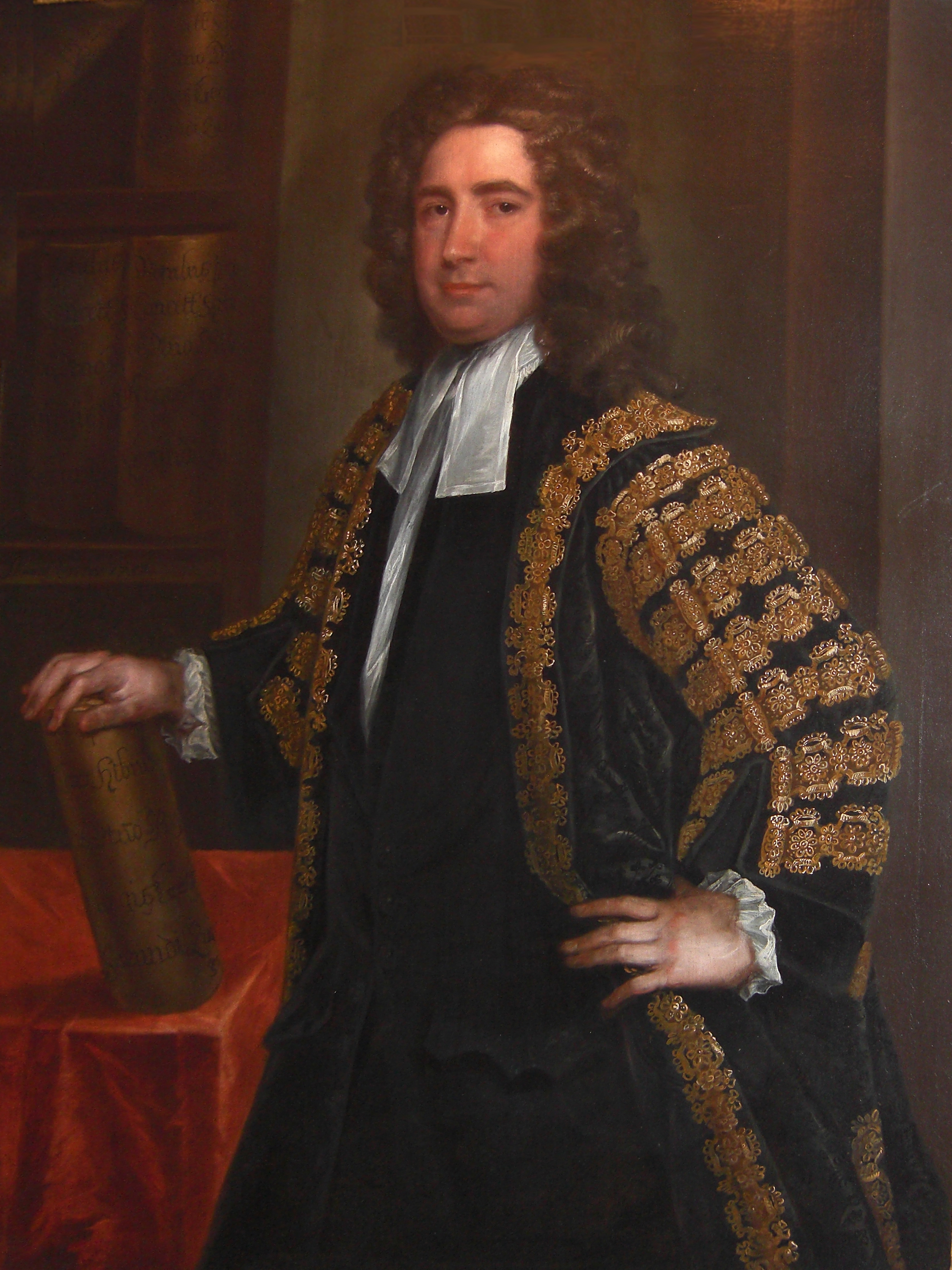
- Portrait by Charles Jervas, c. 1727

Master of the Rolls
- Monarch: George II

Personal details
- Born: c. 1690 Dublin, Ireland
- Died: 3 September 1763 (aged 72–73) Rathnally House, County Meath
- Resting place: St Patrick's Cathedral, Trim
- Party: Patriot Party
- Spouse: Mary Claxton c1700-1780
- Relations: (brothers-in-law) James Johnston Richard Parsons Robert Jocelyn (descendants) Frances Villiers; Admiral John Carter; General George Carter-Campbell; Colonel Duncan Carter-Campbell of Possil
- Children: Thomas, M.P. 1720- Henry Boyle 1726- Frances Twysden, later Johnston; Susan Trotter; Mary Carter
- Education: Trinity College, Dublin

Thomas Carter PC (Ire) (c. 1690 – 3 September 1763) was an Anglo-Irish politician who served as the Master of the Rolls and Secretary of State in Ireland. The British writer Horace Walpole described him as "an able and intriguing man".

== Education ==
Carter entered Trinity College, Dublin on 9 January 1701, and graduated B.A. in 1710.

== Political career ==
Carter was Member of Parliament MP for Trim in County Meath, from 1719 to 1727. In 1727 he was returned as a member for Hillsborough, Dungarvan, and Lismore, but chose to sit for Hillsborough, and held the seat until 1761.

The Carters were a political family. Thomas Carter, the first to live at Castlemartin which he acquired in 1729, was made Master of the Rolls in 1731, which office he had continued to hold until 1754. He was a skilful and experienced parliamentarian and political organiser. A strong, if not often violent Whig, noted for his rudeness and his loathing of English ministerial interference in Irish affairs and his satirical lampooning of political opponents earned him the nickname "Vicious Carter".

During the late 1740s, Carter became one of the leaders of the country of Ireland as a member of the Patriot party along with Henry Boyle, speaker of the Irish House of Commons and Anthony Malone, the Prime Sergeant.

He was made Master of the Rolls in 1731 but as one of the parliamentary managers employed by the Lord Lieutenant to ensure that the King's business was passed in the House of Commons, his actions were often maverick. Horace Walpole said of him that he had "Constantly fomented every discontent against the Lord Lieutenants in order to be bought off". Such behaviour was common in 18th-century politics where interest was so often for sale. Quite content to "feather his own nest", Carter did not always help his colleagues.

== The Money Bill dispute ==
Both the zenith and the nadir of Carter's career came during the Money Bill dispute of the 1750s. The crisis came in 1753–56 when the Chancellor of the Exchequer of Ireland, Henry Boyle, refused to hand over an Irish tax surplus to London.

As a result, Primate Stone Archbishop of Armagh, tried to reduce the influence of the leading parliamentary undertakers; Speaker Boyle, Anthony Malone and Thomas Carter. The archbishop tried to replace them with his own supporters, the Ponsonbys led by the Earl of Bessborough. Boyle, Malone and Carter whipped up popular support, turning the issue into a trial of strength between the Lord Lieutenant and the country or "Patriot" party. Boyle, helped by Carter's wickedly provocative tongue, began a whispering campaign against Primate Stone. There was a personal antagonism between Carter and Primate Stone as the latter had been instrumental in foiling Carter's attempts to obtain the reversion of his office of Master of the Rolls for his young unknown and inexperienced son.

The whole episode of the Money Bill dispute, the motives, intrigues, manoeuvrings and chicanery was wittily and ironically described by Edmund Sexton Pery, an eye-witness and MP for Wicklow town. His description is written in the form of a letter to the Duke of Bedford around the time he was appointed Lord Lieutenant in 1757.

The dispute became an oft-quoted precedent to the policy of the Irish Patriot Party of the 1780s.

== Family ==
Thomas Carter was born in 1690, the son of Thomas Carter (1650–1726) and his wife born Margaret Houghton, of Robertstown, County Kildare. He was educated at Trinity College, Dublin and the King's Inns.

He married on 12 October 1719 at St Anne's, Dublin, Mary Claxton, youngest daughter of Thomas Claxton of Dublin and Lucy Pearce, and so first-cousin of Edward Lovett Pearce who built them a magnificent house at No.9 Henrietta Street with the finest staircase hall in Dublin. They had two sons and three daughters. Their daughter Frances was the mother of Frances, Lady Jersey. Their daughter Susan was a grandmother of Elizabeth, Marchioness of Thomond. Through Frances, they are ancestors of Diana, Princess of Wales, and of her sons, Princes William, the Prince of Wales, and Harry, Duke of Sussex.

Thomas Carter made significant contributions to farming and country pursuits, not sparing any expense to bring them to perfection. He imported the best breed of cattle.

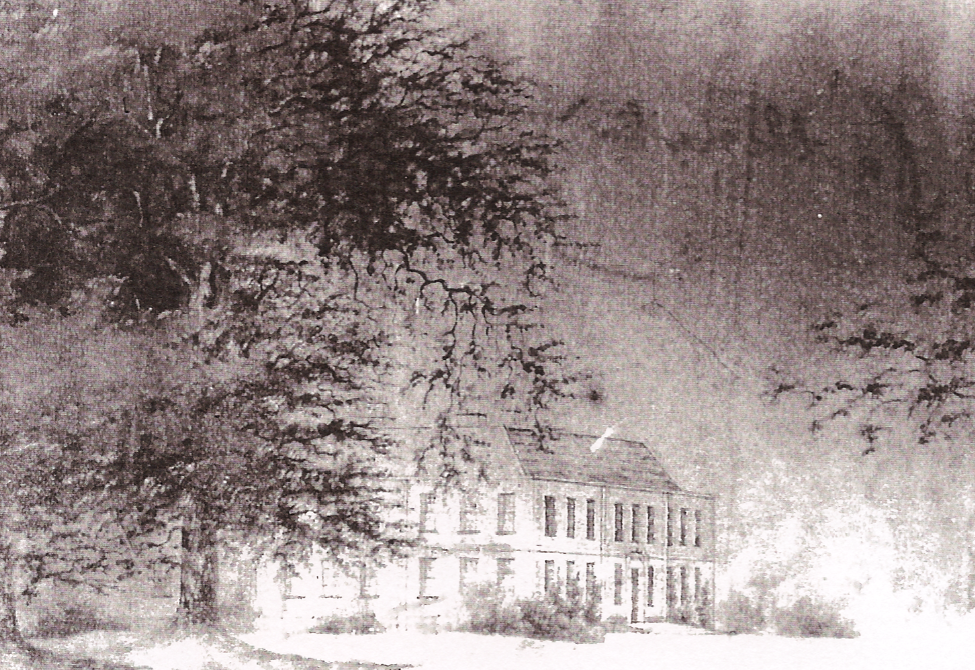
Castle Martin in the snow

He originally leased Castle Martin in the early 1730s as his country seat, and did not buy the house and that estate until 1761, just two years before he died while staying with his elder son, Thomas MP, at Rathnally House, Trim. Twelve days after his father's death Thomas proceeded with his marriage to Anna Armytage, daughter of the Yorkshire baronet Sir Samuel Armytage, but they had just one child, Mary, later Mrs Skeffington Thompson, before young Thomas Carter MP himself died.

So Carter was succeeded at Castlemartin by his second son Henry Boyle Carter, named after his father's friend and political ally, Speaker Boyle. In 1750 Henry married Susanna Shaen, widow of James Wynne, daughter of Sir Arthur Shaen, 2nd baronet, and his Catholic wife Susanna Magan, by whom Henry had three sons and one daughter. (see Carter-Campbell of Possil). Carter's descendants continued to live at Castlemartin until they sold the estate to the Blackers in 1850.

=== Thomas Carter (1650–1726) M.P. father of Thomas Carter (1690–1763) ===
Thomas Carter the elder was obviously a very ambitious young man, he married firstly Margaret Houghton (c. 1660-1696) on 16 December 1681 at St. Audoen's Church, Dublin. During the revolution, he served with distinction at Derry and the Boyne where according to Burke's Irish Landed Gentry (1850 edition) he secured books and writings belonging to James II of England. What happened to these papers is not known. He was elected as an MP to the Irish House of Commons and became Second Sergeant at Arms being returned first for Fethard and then for Portarlington.

He married secondly, Isabella, the dowager Countess Roscommon on 2 August 1702 by which marriage he acquired the extensive Roscommon estates in and around Trim. The Countess was born Isabella Boynton. They had no children and she died in 1721. Thomas Carter's father's seat was at Robertstown, County Meath.
