= Jack Carter =

Jack Carter may refer to:

- Jack Carter (stage actor) (c. 1902–1967), American actor
- Jack Carter (cricketer) (1907–1995), Australian cricketer
- Jack Carter (footballer) (1910–1992), English footballer
- Jack Carter (dancer) (1917–1999), British ballet dancer and choreographer
- Jack Carter (comedian) (1922–2015), American comedian, actor, and host
- Jack W. Carter (1938–2019), American politician
- Jack Carter (politician) (born 1947), American businessman and politician
- Jack Carter, the protagonist of several novels by Ted Lewis and of the film adaptations of those novels
- Jack Carter, a character from Warren Ellis's comic Planetary
- Jack Carter (Eureka character), character on the American science fiction drama Eureka

== See also ==
- John Carter (disambiguation)
- Jack Carter's Law, a 1974 novel by Ted Lewis
- Sir Jack Cater (1922–2006), Chief Secretary of Hong Kong
