= Botanical Research Institute of Texas =

Research institute in Fort Worth, Texas

Coordinates: 32°44′31″N 97°21′46″W

The Botanical Research Institute of Texas (BRIT) is a botanical research institute located in Fort Worth, Texas, United States. It was established in 1987 for the herbarium and botanical library collections of Lloyd H. Shinners from Southern Methodist University but has subsequently expanded substantially. BRIT focuses on plant taxonomy, conservation and knowledge sharing for both scientists and the general public

== History ==
The Botanical Research Institute of Texas was founded in 1987 around the herbarium and library from the Southern Methodist University that been substantially expanded by their final curator, Lloyd Herbert Shinners. It was located in a re-purposed warehouse in the main business and commercial area of Fort Worth. In spring 2011, BRIT moved into new buildings adjacent to the Fort Worth Botanic Garden that dates from 1934. The buildings were designed by Hugh Hardy of H3 Hardy Collaboration Architecture and have a LEED-NC platinum rating from the U.S. Green Building Council for efficiency and sustainable design. The Institute is a 501(c)(3) private, non-profit organization governed by a board of trustees.

The institute now consists of a two-story Archives Block that houses the herbarium in a 20,000-square-foot (1,900 m^{2}), climate-controlled space, with the remaining 5,000 square feet (460 m^{2}) for research and a library. Part of the roof is covered with solar panels. A second building, the 44,000-square-foot (4,100 m^{2}) Think Block is used for education programs, exhibits and administrative offices. This building has natural lighting through floor-to-ceiling glass on the north façade. The building design allows for future expansion. A green roof of native Texan prairie plants was installed between 2007 and 2012.

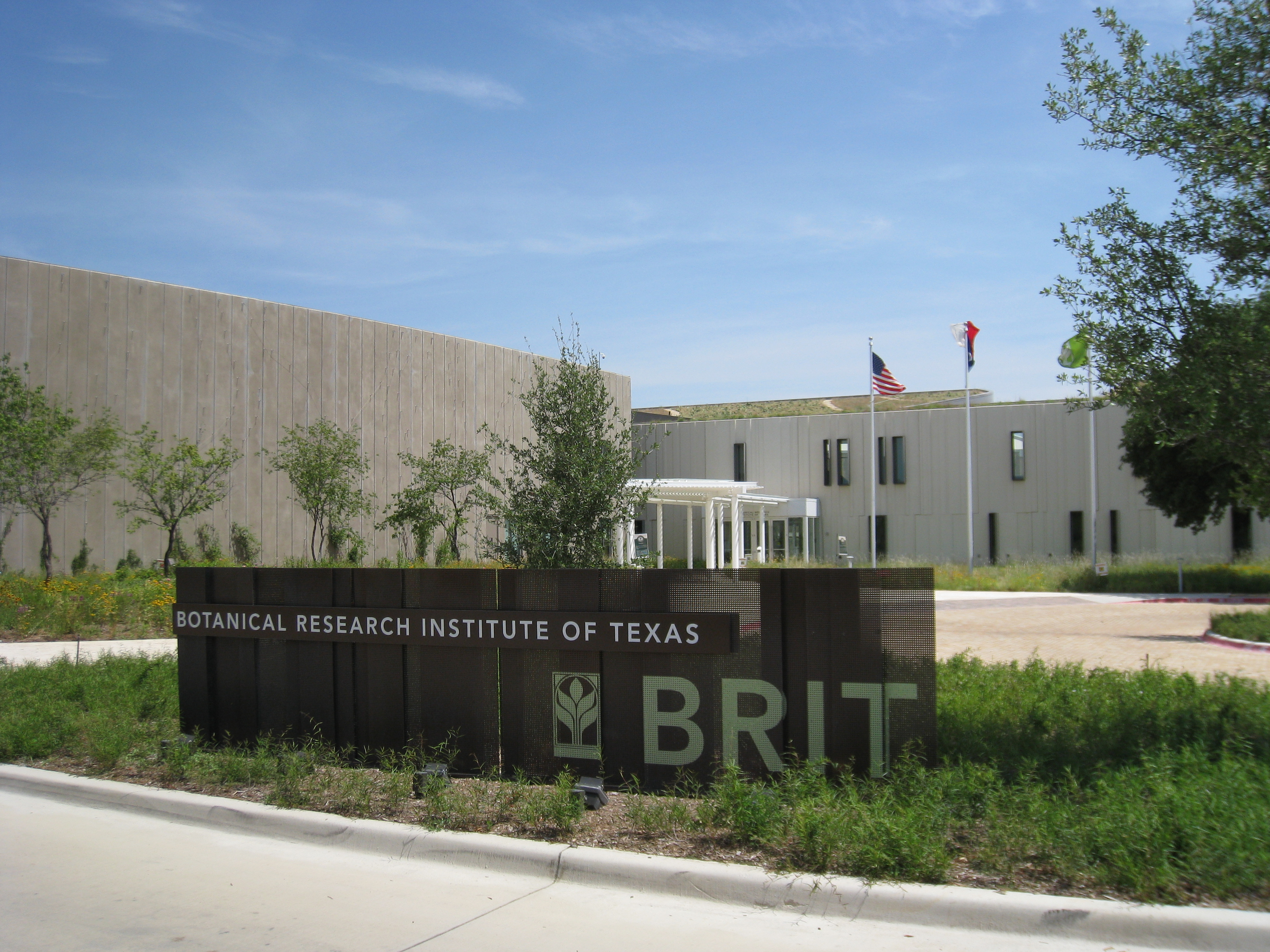
The BRIT building, seen from the parking lot. The Archives Block is on the left, Think Block on the right.

== BRIT Collections and Programs ==
Although BRIT covers the local Texan flora, it also includes plants world-wide. It contains a world-class collection of preserved plant specimens and books and also publishes about plants. Its staff provide outreach activities and also research and conservation about plants.

=== Herbarium ===
The Philecology Herbarium represents is among the ten largest in the United States with more than 1.5 million preserved plant specimens, some dating back to the late 1700s. These include the Lloyd H. Shinners Collection in Systematic Botany started in 1944, formerly housed at Southern Methodist University and moved to BRIT in 1991, and the Vanderbilt University Collection founded by Robert Kral was donated in 1997. In 2017 the R. Dale Thomas Plant Collection from University of Louisiana of around 0.5 million specimens was added. There are also a number of smaller collections, such as from the Houston Public Museum herbarium acquired in 2001, and the institute actively adds to the herbarium.

=== Library ===
The library contains around 125,000 books, journals and periodicals from around the world. It was started from the personal libraries of Lloyd H. Shinners and Eula Whitehouse. Although the content now focuses on material for research in systematic botany and the history of botany, there is broad coverage of plant-related subjects. In 1997, BRIT was given the Burk Children's Library of 4,000 children's books on botany and natural history.

=== Research ===
Botanical research is conducted in Texas and also in tropical rainforests such as the Philippines, Costa Rica, Peru and Papua New Guinea. The research is divided into three programs: Floras, Plants and Peoples, and Landscape Ecology. Floras encompasses the discovery, classification, and characterization of plants and vegetation and researchers employed by the institute have described more than 80 new species. They have also undertaken floristic and systematic research in Texas, the USA and worldwide using their taxonomic expertise in a number of plant families. Surveys within the USA involve collaboration with the U.S. Fish and Wildlife Service, The Nature Conservancy, and Texas Parks and Wildlife Department. Programs within the Floras remit include the Illustrated Texas Floras Project that has produced several publications useful for the citizens of Texas, contributing the Asteraceae section to the Flora of North America (FNA) Project and the Andes to Amazon Botany Program (AABP)

Plants and Peoples explores the relationship people have developed with plants. Landscape Ecology investigates plants and the environment. The institute also provides consulting and resource services.

=== Publications ===
The staff at BRIT publish new discoveries in plant science the professional literature and also in forms more accessible to the general public. In 1999, BRIT published Shinners & Mahler's Illustrated Flora of North Central Texas, written in collaboration with the Biology Department and Center for Environmental Studies at Austin College in both printed and on-line format.

BRIT also publishes two scientific periodicals: the peer-reviewed Journal of the Botanical Research Institute of Texas (formerly called SIDA, Contributions to Botany) and Botanical Miscellany, an occasional series of monographs in which each edition is devoted entirely to a comprehensive study of one topic. In addition there is a newsletter, IRIDOS, which is distributed to Friends of BRIT.

The institute has established several annual awards. Since 1993 the institute has presented an International Award of Excellence in Conservation annually to an individual or organization that exemplifies ideals expressed in BRIT's mission. Awardees have included Sylvia Earle (2018), Thomas E. Lovejoy (2014), Lady Bird Johnson, Robert K. Watson, Ted Turner, John Cain Carter and Peter Hamilton Raven. In 2001 the Wendy Owsley Garrett Science Teacher Award was introduced and in 2010 the International Award of Excellence in Sustainable Winegrowing.

=== Education ===
BRIT's plant collections and educational programs are open to the public. BRIT's education programs about plants include lectures, workshops and classes at levels suitable for adults, families, schoolchildren and professional development for teachers. The programs are provided in collaboration with a large number of external organisations to deliver these programs. The teacher learning center is endowed by The Rainwater Charitable Foundation. There is a Distinguished Lecturer series about current plant-related topics as a public service to the community. The T.M. Barkley Plant Science and Ecology Seminar, in collaboration with Christian University, provides a forum for faculty and university students to present current research.

=== Volunteers ===
BRIT also engages volunteers to support research initiatives, contribute to development workshops, assist with special events, and participate in youth education programs. Volunteers help prepare botanical specimens and documentation, offer support in the botanical library, welcome visitors, and serve as tour docents.
