= Admiral Carter =

Admiral Carter may refer to:

- John Carter (Royal Navy officer) (1785–1863), British Royal Navy admiral
- Powell F. Carter Jr. (1931–2017), U.S. Navy admiral
- Samuel P. Carter (1819–1891), U.S. Navy rear admiral
- Stuart Bonham Carter (1889–1972), British Royal Navy vice admiral
- Walter E. Carter Jr. (born 1959), U.S. Navy vice admiral
