= John Tatham =

English dramatist

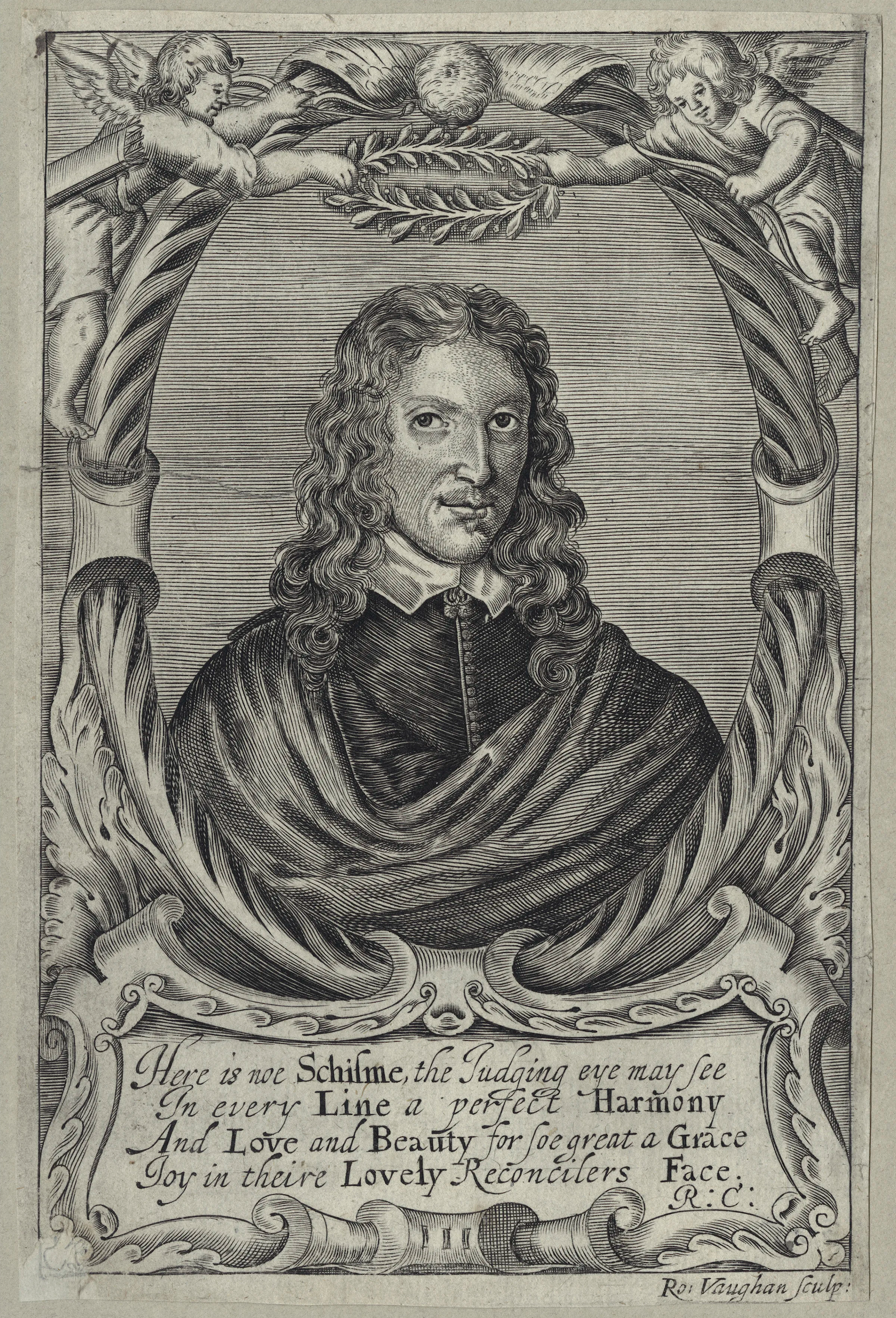
Engraving of Tatham by Robert Vaughan

John Tatham (fl. 1632–1664) was an English dramatist of the mid-17th century. He was a strong Cavalier.

== Hatreds ==
Little is known of Tatham personally. He was a Cavalier, with a hatred of the Puritans and of the Scots – he went so far as to invent a dialect that he claimed was the Scots vernacular.

== Poems and stage works ==
Fancy's Theatre, a collection of his poems, was published in 1640. It included an elegy on the dramatist John Day. In the years 1657–64, Tatham produced eight pageants for the annual London Lord Mayor's Show, seven of which were entitled London's Triumph). He also wrote London's Glory, an entertainment to celebrate the return of King Charles II to London at the Restoration. This was performed on 5 July 1660.

Among the known plays by John Tatham are:

- Love Crowns the End (1632; printed 1646)
- The Distracted State (1641; printed 1651)
- The Scots Figgaries, or a Knot of Knaves (printed 1652)
- The Rump (printed 1660).

== Legacy ==
In 1682, Aphra Behn adapted The Rump as a play of her own, The Roundheads.

== Sources ==
- John Tatham, The Dramatic Works of John Tatham. James Maidment and W. H. Logan, eds. London, H. Southeran, 1879

Civic offices
Preceded by "J. B."	Poet to the Corporation of London; 1657–1664	Succeeded by Thomas Jordan
