= John J. Carter =

Irish officer who fought in the American Civil War

- Born: June 16, 1842; Westport, County Mayo, Ireland
- Died: January 3, 1917 (aged 74); Titusville, Pennsylvania
- Burial place: Woodlawn Cemetery
- Military career
- Allegiance: United States of America
- Branch: United States Army
- Service years: 1861 - 1865
- Rank: Captain
- Unit: (New York (state)) 33rd Regiment New York Volunteer Infantry
- Conflicts: Battle of Antietam
- Awards: Medal of Honor

John Joyce Carter (June 16, 1842 to January 3, 1917) was an Irish officer who fought in the American Civil War. Carter received the United States' highest award for bravery during combat, the Medal of Honor, for his action during the Battle of Antietam in Maryland on 17 September 1862. He was honored with the award on 10 September 1897.

== Biography ==
Carter was born on 16 June 1842 in Westport, Ireland and emigrated to the United States in approximately 1845. He enlisted into the 33rd New York Volunteer Infantry Regiment at Nunda, New York in May 1861, and was commissioned as a Second Lieutenant in June 1862. Following his Medal of Honor action, he mustered out with the 33rd NY Infantry in June 1863. After a short time as a civilian, he was appointed as a Captain of the 1st New York Veteran Cavalry in October 1863. He again mustered out with his regiment in July 1865.

Following the war, Carter resided in Pennsylvania and pursued various business ventures, including a clothing store in Titusville and an oil company called Carter Oil, which later became known as Exxon. He was a companion of the Pennsylvania Commandery of the Military Order of the Loyal Legion of the United States.

Carter died on 3 January 1917 and his remains are interred at the Woodlawn Cemetery in Titusville, Pennsylvania.

== Medal of Honor citation ==
While in command of a detached company, seeing his regiment thrown into confusion by a charge of the enemy, without orders made a countercharge upon the attacking column and checked the assault. Penetrated within the enemy's lines at night and obtained valuable information.

== See also ==
- List of American Civil War Medal of Honor recipients: A–F
