= Alexander Campbell of Possil =

The Right Honourable Alexander Campbell of Possil OM
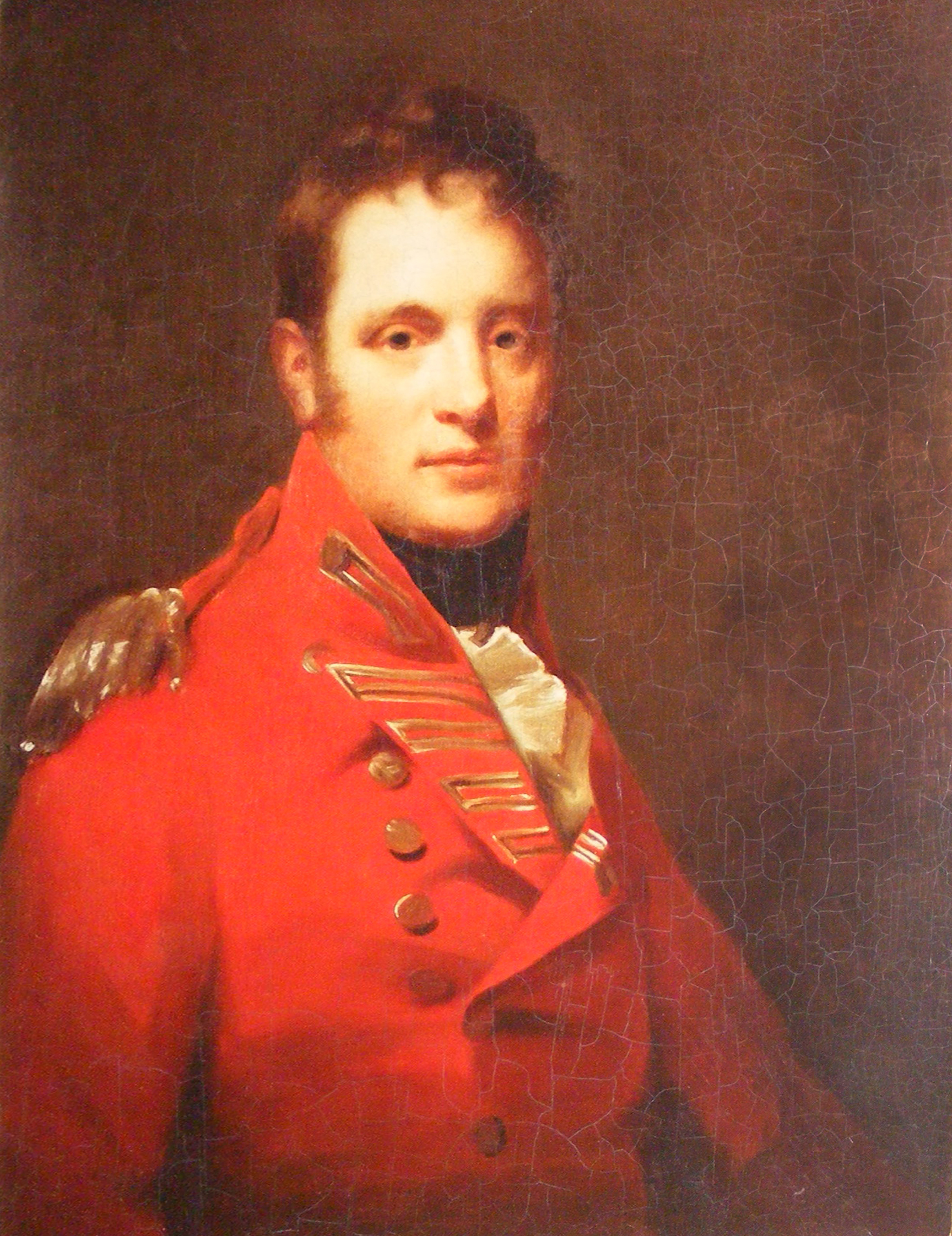
- The portrait of Colonel Alexander Campbell of Possil by Sir Henry Raeburn 1756–1823. Exhibited: Edinburgh Raeburn Exhibition of 1876 no. 205. Other portraits of the Campbells of Possil belonging to the family were also exhibited at the 1876 Raeburn exhibition.
- Relatives: General George Carter-Campbell, Major General Sir Archibald Campbell K.B. of Inverneill, Colonel Duncan Carter-Campbell of Possil, General Sir James Campbell of Inverneill, Willoughby Harcourt Carter
- Military career
- Allegiance: United Kingdom
- Branch: British Army
- Rank: Colonel

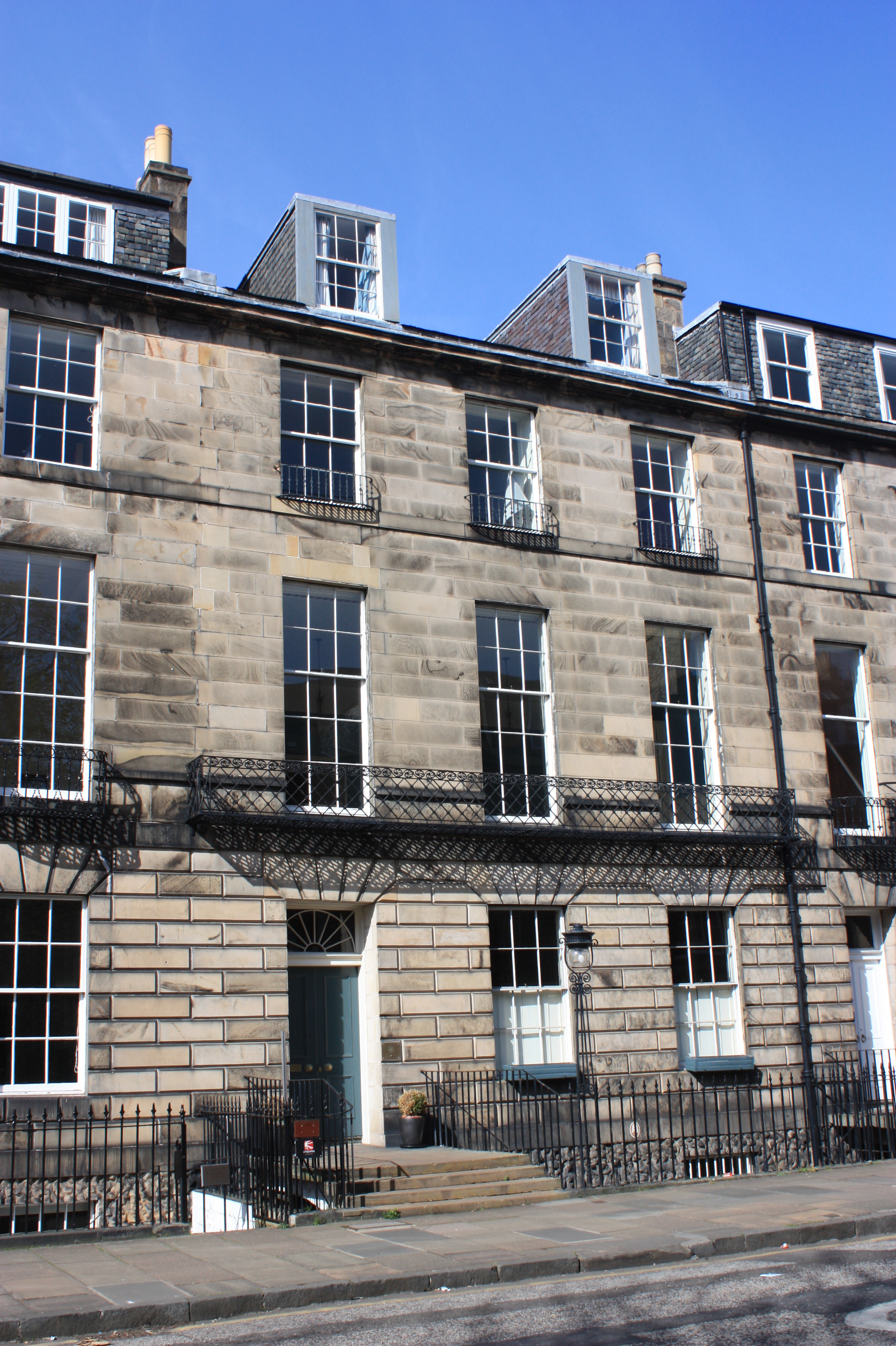
12 Abercromby Place, Edinburgh, Campbell's Edinburgh townhouse

Colonel Alexander Campbell of Possil (see Carter-Campbell of Possil) (1754–1849) entered the army as an ensign in the 42nd Regiment in April 1769, and obtained a lieutenancy in the 2nd Battalion Royals the following year in Menorca.

== Military career ==
He moved to the 62nd regiment later that year in Ireland and went with the regiment to Canada, where, as a captain of light infantry under General Carleton, he fought in the campaigns of 1776 and 1777 with General Burgoyne in the American War of Independence.

After the surrender of Saratoga, he was sent to New York, with the rank of major, and was appointed to the 1st Battalion of Light Infantry. He received the lieutenant-colonelcy of the 62nd Regiment in 1782. Soon afterwards, he returned to Scotland, where he remained with his regiment until 1789. He served with the Duke of York and Albany in the 1790s and was given the rank of colonel on 1 October 1793. He raised the 116th Regiment in 1794 and was their first brigadier-general. He was sent to the West Indies under Sir Ralph Abercromby and on 10 November 1796 was appointed colonel of the 7th West India Regiment.

He returned to Scotland at the end of the 1790s and was placed on the Staff in Ireland and Scotland for five years. On 11 July 1804, he was appointed colonel of the 19th Foot and served during the battles in South Africa, being present at the capture of the Cape of Good Hope in 1806. He was also present at the battle of Corunna, where he commanded the 20th Regiment and subsequently became general on 1 January 1812 and colonel of the 32nd Foot in February 1813.

== Slave holder ==
Records compiled by the Legacies of British Slave-Ownership at the University College London show that Campbell was awarded compensation in the aftermath of the Slavery Abolition Act 1833 with the Slave Compensation Act 1837.

Campbell was associated with "T71/880 Grenada claim no. 704 (Mount Rose)", under which he owned 232 slaves in Grenada. He was awarded £6,113 (worth £629,113 in 2025).

== Land ownership ==
In 1808, he acquired the estates of Possil in Lanarkshire from his father John Campbell, founder of the West Indian trading house of John Campbell Sr. of Glasgow, and subsequently the estates of Torosay and Achnacroish on the Isle of Mull, Argyllshire.

In the 1830s "Alexander Campbell of Possil" is noted as residing at 12 Abercromby Place in the Second New Town in Edinburgh, overlooking Queen Street Gardens.

== See also ==
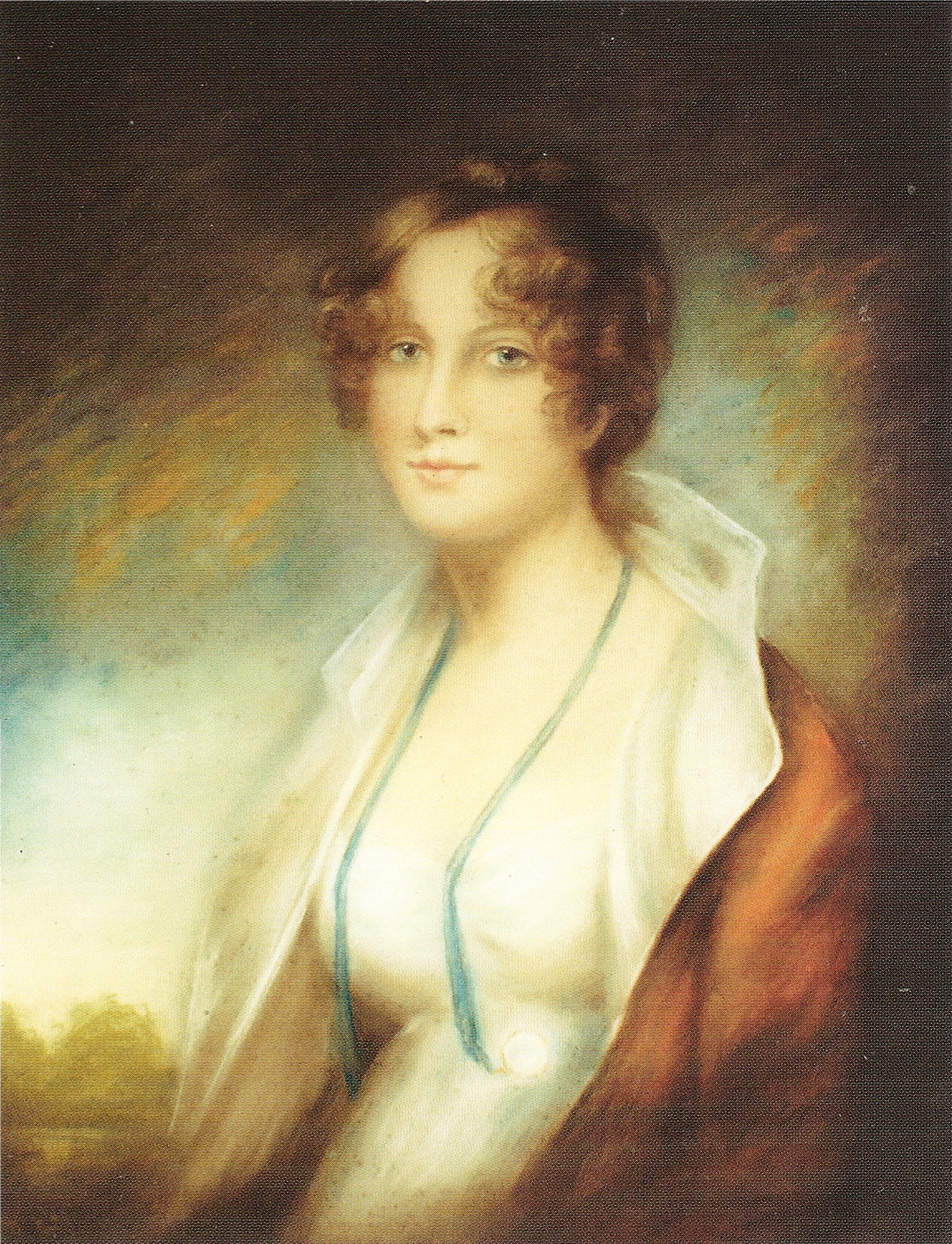
Mrs Alexander Campbell of Possil (artist Sir Henry Raeburn) Née Harriet Maclachlan of Castle Lachlan, Argyll (see Clan Maclachlan).

- Torosay Castle
- Possil Estate (Possil Park today)
- Duart Castle
- Clan Campbell
- Clan Maclachlan
- Clan Lamont
- Henry Raeburn
