= George Carter-Campbell =

British Army general (1869–1921)

Major-General George Carter-Campbell CB DSO
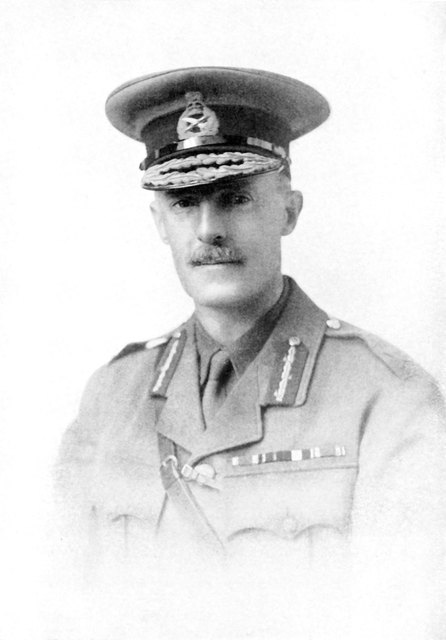
- Born: 2 April 1869; Kensington, London, England
- Died: 19 December 1921 (aged 52); London, England
- Relatives: Thomas Carter; General George Campbell of Inverneill; Admiral John Carter; Colonel Alexander Campbell of Possil; Major General Sir Archibald Campbell; General Sir James Campbell of Inverneill; Colonel Duncan Carter-Campbell of Possil; Willoughby Harcourt Carter
- Military career
- Allegiance: United Kingdom
- Branch: British Army
- Service years: 1889–1921
- Rank: Major-General
- Unit: Cameronians (Scottish Rifles)
- Commands: 51st (Highland) Division; 94th Brigade; 2nd Battalion, Cameronians (Scottish Rifles)
- Conflicts: Second Boer War; First World War
- Awards: Companion of the Order of the Bath; Distinguished Service Order; Mentioned in Despatches; Order of St. Stanislaus (Russia); Commander of the Legion of Honour (France)

Major-General George Tupper Campbell Carter-Campbell, CB, DSO (2 April 1869 – 19 December 1921) was a senior British Army officer who served in the Second Boer War and the First World War.

== Early life ==
A member of the Carter-Campbell of Possil family, Carter-Campbell was born in Kensington, the third son of Thomas Tupper Carter-Campbell of Possil and his wife, Emily Georgina Campbell, daughter of George Campbell of Inverneill.

== Military career ==
Carter-Campbell entered the Royal Military College, Sandhurst, and was commissioned as a subaltern, with the rank of second lieutenant, into the Cameronians (Scottish Rifles) on 23 October 1889.

In the next decade he was promoted to lieutenant on 29 April 1892, and to captain on 2 November 1897. He served in the Second Boer War (1899–1902) as adjutant of the 2nd Battalion, which took part in the Ladysmith Relief Force, where he was present at the battles of Colenso (December 1899), Spion Kop (January 1900), Vaal Krantz and the Tugela Heights (February 1900). They served in Natal from March to June 1900, then in Transvaal east of Pretoria from July to November 1900. For his services he was promoted brevet major on 29 November 1900, and twice mentioned in despatches. Following the end of hostilities in South Africa, he returned to the United Kingdom in August 1902.

On the outbreak of the First World War, Carter-Campbell proceeded to France with the 8th Division as second-in-command of the 2nd Battalion, Cameronians (Scottish Rifles) and was wounded during the Battle of Neuve Chapelle on 10 March 1915, being awarded the Distinguished Service Order (DSO) and also the Order of St. Stanislaus. The citation for his DSO, which appeared in The London Gazette in April 1915, reads as follows:

For conspicuous gallantry and ability at Neuve Chapelle from 10th to 12th March, 1915.

He took over command of the Battalion on 10th March, and, although wounded, maintained with great determination the positions which had been gained.

He had only one surviving Officer to assist him.

Carter-Campbell subsequently commanded the battalion until 23 September 1915, when he was promoted brigadier general to command the 94th Infantry Brigade. While holding the latter command, he was gazetted brevet lieutenant colonel in June 1916 and finally brevet colonel a year later "for distinguished service in the Field".

Promoted to temporary major general, Carter-Campbell assumed command of the 51st (Highland) Division on 17 March 1918, taking over from Major General George Harper, and was its GOC until he was transferred to the Rhine to take command of a brigade there, shortly before the division preceded home for demobilization. While in command of the 51st Division, Carter-Campbell was appointed a Companion of the Order of the Bath (CB). and Commander of the French Legion of Honour.

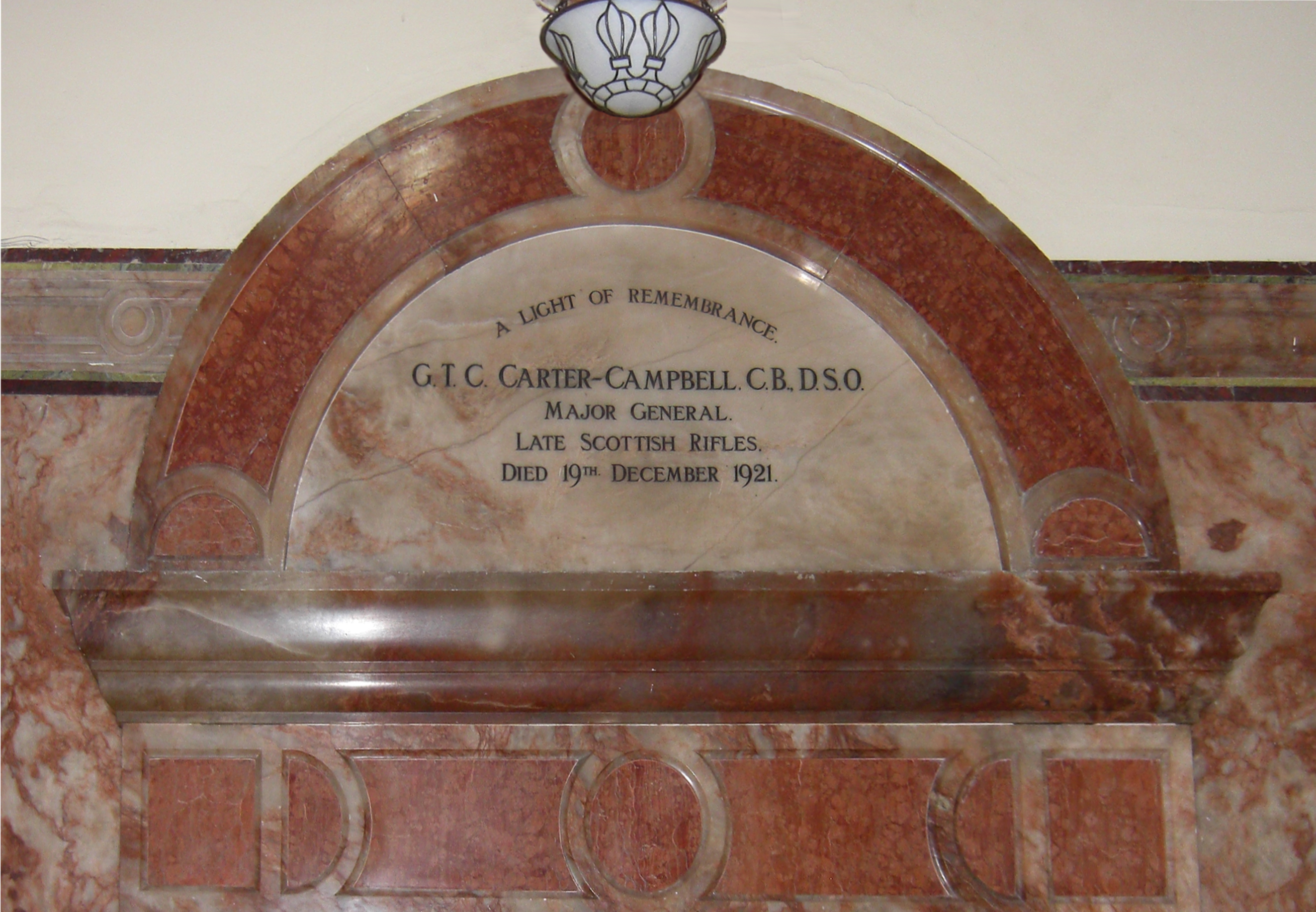
The dedication to Major General Carter-Campbell in the Royal Memorial Chapel at the Royal Military Academy Sandhurst

Carter-Campbell was wounded during the First World War. After the war had ended, and he had recovered sufficiently, he was promoted to substantive colonel on 2 June 1919 and made GOC Northern Ireland in 1920.

However, he died in 1921 at Queen Alexandra Military Hospital in London, with his war service being blamed for his premature death.

== Family ==
Carter-Campbell married Frances Elizabeth Ward. They had two children, Dorothy Catherine Carter-Campbell and Duncan Maclachlan Carter-Campbell, 8th of Possil.

== Notes ==
Military offices
Preceded by George Harper	GOC 51st (Highland) Division; 1918–1919	Succeeded by Ewen Sinclair-MacLagan
