= Thomas Jordan (poet) =

English poet, playwright and actor (c1612–1685)

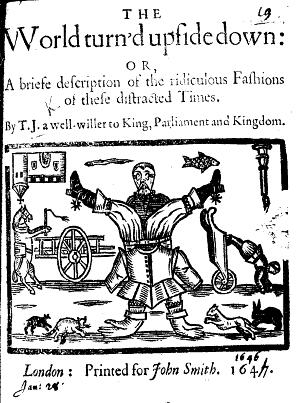
Cover of "The World turn'd upside down" (1646) by "T.J.", believed to stand for Thomas Jordan

Thomas Jordan (c. 1612–1685) was an English poet, playwright and actor, born possibly in London or Eynsham in Oxfordshire about 1612 or 1614.

== Early career ==
Jordan was a boy actor in the King's Revels Company, which played at the Salisbury Court and Fortune theatres, and continued with the company as an adult. He is known to have performed the part of Lepida, the mother of Messalina, in Thomas Rawlins's Messalina (published in 1640) some time between 1634 and 1636. In 1637, Jordan published his earliest known work, Poeticall Varieties, or Variety of Fancies, which shows his theatrical background. It was dedicated to John Ford of Gray's Inn, a cousin of John Ford the dramatist. His connection with the King's Revels Company ceased in 1636, and his activities in the late 1630s are not known. Lynn Hulse suggests as "an attractive possibility" that he may then have been attached to the Werburgh Street Theatre in Dublin. Details that support an Irish connection include a commendatory verse signed "T.I." in one of the plays of James Shirley, the Werburgh Street house dramatist, and the dedication of Jordan's miscellany Sacred Poems (1640) to James Ussher, archbishop of Armagh and primate of all Ireland. By 1641 he was acting with the King's Company at their playhouse in Clerkenwell. His second comedy, "Youths Figaries", was written for the troupe that year and was "publikely Acted 19. days together, with extraordinary Applause" (published in 1657 as The Walks of Islington and Hogsdon, a title which refers to the many taverns frequented in the course of the play).

== Commonwealth period ==
In the period of the official closing of the theatres during the Commonwealth, 1642–60, Jordan was apparently involved in some of the clandestine theatrical activities at the Red Bull Theatre. In a raid on the playhouse in September 1655, several actors were arrested, including one Thomas Jay, alias Thomas Jordan. Jordan probably also supported himself and his family for some time by writing dedications, commendatory verses, and panegyrics. According to Thomas Seccombe's Dictionary of National Biography article, these were remarkable for their brazen plagiarisms: "His plan seems to have been to print a book with the dedication in blank, and to fill in the name afterwards by means of a small press worked by himself". For example, Wit in a Wildernesse was dedicated to at least five different individuals. Jordan frequently reissued both his own and other people's already-published works with new title-pages.

Jordan was a prolific writer of verse, satire, collections of poetry and sundries. Being a fervent supporter of the Royalist cause, he produced a stream of both prose and poetry in support of the cause, both before and after the Restoration in 1660. The miscellany A Royal Arbor of Loyal Poesie, written in 1663, was reissued five times.

When the theatres were reopened at the Restoration in 1660, Jordan again focused his energies on the drama, writing two plays and a masque as well as numerous drolls, afterpieces, prologues and epilogues, and also doing some acting. He played the part of Captain Penniless in his own play Money is an Ass (1668).

== City poet ==
Jordan started writing civic verse in the late 1650s, including an eclogue in four parts for the Lord Mayor, Sir Thomas Allen, and a jig, "The Cheaters Cheated", for the sheriffs of London. He wrote speeches and songs for at least five of the great livery company feasts given in honour of General Monck in the spring of 1660. In 1671 he was chosen to be poet of the corporation of London. The chief duties of the city laureates were to invent pageants for the successive Lord Mayor's Shows, and to compose a yearly panegyric upon the Lord Mayor elect. Jordan conducted the annual civic ceremonies very successfully for fourteen years, adapting each to the changing political situation. His civic entertainments were according to S. J. Owen characterised by "moderation and peace, coupled with Protestantism, patriotism, the promotion of trade, and a socially inclusive vision in which the city and its government have an important role in the nation". He was succeeded by Matthew Taubman in 1685, which has been generally assumed to be the year of Jordan's death.

== Reputation ==
Several of his contemporaries wrote scornfully of Jordan. The biographer William Winstanley ranks him with John Tatham as "indulging his Muse more to vulgar fancies than the high-flying wits of those times" and Samuel Wesley in his Maggots (1685) calls Jordan's muse the inspirer of dullness. Later readers have been more appreciative. William Hazlitt credited Jordan with a greater share of poetical merit than most of his profession.

Jordan's carpe diem-themed poem "Coronemus nos Rosis antequam marcescant", alternatively "Let us drink and be merry", was widely anthologised in the early 20th century, and the text of the poem is available on several internet sites.

Civic offices
Preceded by John Tatham	Poet to the Corporation of London; 1671–1685	Succeeded by Matthew Taubman
