= Jonathan Carter =

Jonathan Carter may refer to:

- Jonathan Carter (American football) (born 1979), American football wide receiver
- Jonathan Carter (athlete) (born 1972), American former sprinter
- Jonathan Carter (cricketer) (born 1987), cricketer who plays for Barbados
- Jonathan Carter (politician), American politician in Maine
- Jonathan H. Carter (1821–1884), North Carolina-born planter, sailor, and Confederate States of America gunboat builder
- Jonathan Carter, the 2020 Debian Project Leader.

== See also ==
- John Carter (disambiguation)
