= John Carter the elder =

English divine

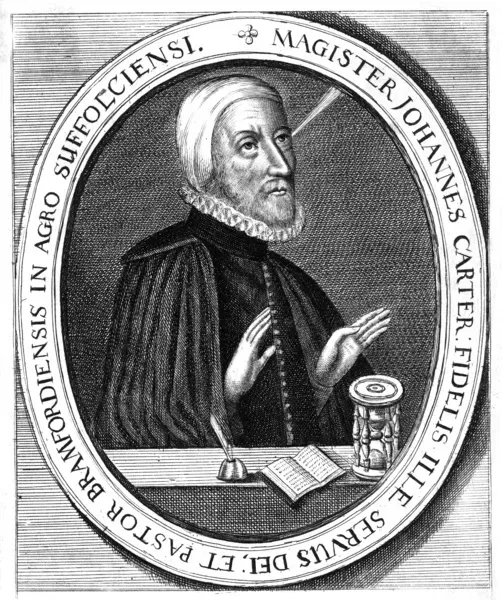
- Born: 1554; Wickham, Kent, England
- Died: 21 February 1634–5
- Occupation: Divine

John Carter the elder (1554 – 21 Feb. 1634–5) was an English divine.

== Biography ==
Carter was born at Wickham, Kent, in 1554. He was educated at Clare Hall, Cambridge, under Dr. Thomas Byng, through the generosity of a Mr. Rose of Canterbury. After taking his degree Dr. Byng offered Carter rooms in his own house to enable him to continue his studies, and he thus became intimate with Dr. Chaderton, Lancelot Andrewes, and Nathaniel Culverwel In 1583 he became vicar of Bramford, Suffolk, and performed his pastoral duties with great zeal. His avowal of Puritanism raised up enemies in his parish, and after many disputes with his bishop he was removed to the rectory of Belstead, also in Suffolk, in 1617. He died on 21 February 1634–5. Samuel Carter of Ipswich preached the funeral sermon. His son, John Carter the younger, drew up an anecdotal life of his father, which attests Carter's piety, good-humour, and wit. It was first published in 1653 under the title of "The Tombstone, or a Broken and Imperfect Monument of that worthy Man, Mr. John Carter," London, with dedications to "the Lady Frances Hobarte," and others. It was republished in Samuel Clarke's "Collection of the Lives of Ten Eminent Divines" in 1662.

A fine portrait, engraved by Robert Vaughan, is prefixed to each edition of the life. Carter was the author of "A Plaine and Compendious Exposition of Christ's Sermon on the Mount," London, 1627, and of an unpublished petition to James I for the removal of burdensome ceremonies.
