= Jewson =

British building materials company

Jewson Ltd
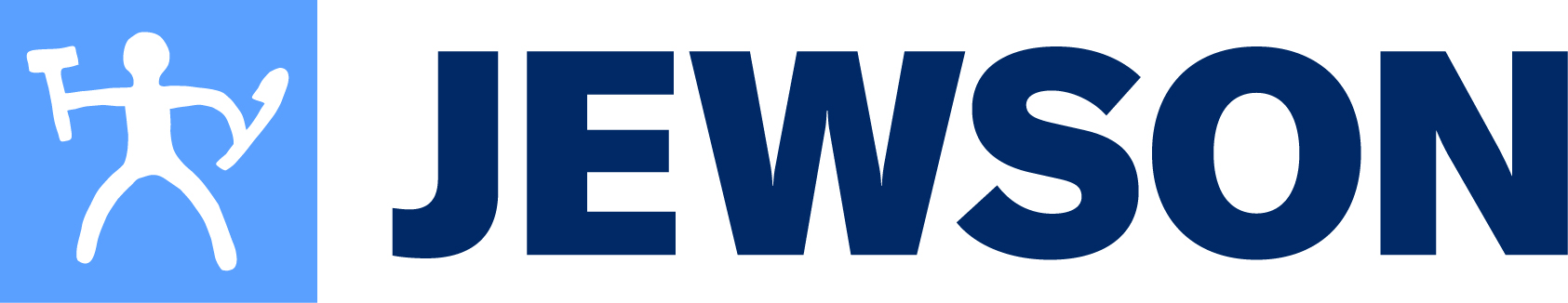
- Type: Limited company
- Industry: Building materials
- Founded: 1836; 190 years ago
- Founder: George Jewson
- Headquarters: Merchant House, Binley Business Park, Binley, Coventry
- Area served: United Kingdom, Ireland
- Key people: John Carter (CEO)
- Products: Building materials, joiners merchants
- Parent: Stark Group
- Website: www.jewson.co.uk

Jewson is one of the largest chains of British general builders' merchants, selling to small and medium building contractors. The chain comprises around 500 branches located all across Great Britain. Jewson is owned by Stark Group.

== History ==
George Jewson bought a business in Earith in 1836 to trade goods in the Huntingdonshire Fens of East Anglia. His son John Wilson Jewson (b. 1817) had 13 children: the eldest, George, at the time working with a timber merchant in Norwich, suggested expansion there.

John Jewson bought a house in Colegate in Norwich in 1868, and he moved there where he developed a successful timber, coal and builders' merchant business. The family played a role in civic service in Norwich and Norfolk.

Jewson, as part of the Meyer group, was acquired by the French conglomerate Saint-Gobain in April 2000.

In 2011, it acquired Build Center from Wolseley UK.

In March 2023, Saint-Gobain sold Jewson to Stark Group for £740 million. The sale included Gibbs & Dandy, the Northern Ireland based brand JP Corry, specialist brands Jewson Civil Frazer and Minster, and International Timber. STARK appointed former Travis Perkins executive John Carter as CEO of the newly-formed Stark Building Materials UK Ltd.

== Litigation ==
On 15 May 2009, Jewson Ltd applied under s.69 (1) Companies Act 2006 for a change of name of Jewson's Drives Ltd which had been registered since 18 March 2009. Jewson Ltd argued that they enjoyed goodwill under the name "Jewson" since 1836 and that they were the United Kingdom's leading timber and builders' merchant. Jewson Ltd alleged that Jewson's Drives Ltd had been offering flagging, paving, fencing and related services and that their own customers had been misled by the respondent. However, as long as Jewson's Drives Ltd had actually been operating as a business and there was no evidence to show they only registered their name for the purpose of obtaining (valuable) consideration from Jewson Ltd or for the sake of obstructing their own registration of a name, then they could have a defence to the application. Jewson Ltd's application was struck out by the adjudicator.
