= John Carter (businessman) =

British businessman

- Born: May 1961 (age 64)
- Occupation: CEO of Stark Building Materials UK Ltd
- Board member of: McCarthy & Stone

John Peter Carter (born May 1961) is a British businessman, appointed in March 2023 as CEO of Stark Building Materials UK. He was chief executive (CEO) of Travis Perkins, the FTSE 250 builders' merchant and home improvement retailer with 1,900 outlets from January 2015 until he stepped down in August 2019.

Carter worked for Travis Perkins for 35 years, having joined Sandell Perkins in 1978 as a management trainee. In January 2014, he succeeded Geoff Cooper as CEO.

In March 2023, after Saint-Gobain had completed the sale of Jewson to Denmark's Stark Group for £740m, the new owners appointed Carter as CEO of the newly-formed Stark Building Materials UK Ltd.
