= Stark Group =

Danish building materials company

STARK Group
- Industry: Building materials
- Founded: 1896
- Headquarters: Frederiksberg, Denmark
- Key people: Søren Peschardt Olesen (CEO)
- Services: Retailer and distributor of building materials
- Number of employees: 18,500 (in 2017)
- Parent: CVC Capital
- Website: https://starkgroup.dk/

STARK Group is one of the largest retailers and distributors of building materials for the professional segment in Europe with approx. 18,500 employees and 1,050 branches and distribution centres. Headquartered in Frederiksberg, Denmark, STARK Group owns and operates six builders’ merchant chains, STARK Building Materials UK, with Jewson as the most significant brand, in the United Kingdom, STARK Deutschland GmbH in Germany and Austria, STARK Danmark in Denmark and Greenland, Beijer Byggmaterial AB in Sweden, STARK Suomi Oy in Finland, and Neumann Bygg A/S in Norway.

== History ==
STARK Group was founded in 1896, under the name Århus Trælasthandel A/S. Following an expansion of the company, organizationally as well as geographically, the group was, in 1918, listed on the stock exchange 1918 and changed its name to Det Danske Trælastkompagni. In 1968, the group established the first DIY market, Silvan, for the do-it-yourself consumer, which became the group's first subsidiary.

In 1989, the group expanded geographically by acquiring the Swedish builders’ merchant Beijer Byggmaterial AB, which became the group's second subsidiary. Seven years later – in 1996 – the group expanded into the Norwegian market as it acquired the Norwegian builders' merchant Neumann Bygg, and in July 2000, the Finnish-based Starkki became a new member of the group. By 2004, Danske Trælast was the parent company of a huge group that, besides the four Nordic subsidiaries, was responsible for 75 timber yards in Denmark. These were gathered under the name STARK, which became the fifth subsidiary. In 2006, the group changed its name to DT Group A/S and was sold to the English firm Ferguson.

As of 2017, the first subsidiary, Silvan, was sold to a German private equity fund. The same year, the Group changed its name to STARK Group. A year later – in 2018 – the Group was sold to the American Private Equity fund Lone Star. In 201,9 STARK Group acquired the German builders' merchant Saint Gobain Building Distribution Deutschland GmbH and became the largest retailer and distributor of building materials in Northern Europe. In 2021, CVC Capital Partners acquired STARK Group from Lone Star.

In December 2022, Saint-Gobain sold the UK-based Jewson group to STARK Group for £740m. The sale included Northern Ireland local brands Gibbs & Dandy and JP Corry, specialist brands Jewson Civil Frazer, Minster, International Timber and Normans. In 2023, it began working with Infosys on a new data center in Denmark.

== Employment ==
As of November 2025, STARK Group employs 18,500 spread across 6 subsidiaries and the headquarters. The Group employs approx. 7,000 in STARK Building Materials UK, 5,000 in STARK Deutschland and 5,500 in the Nordics

== Strategy ==
As part of STARK Group's strategic journey, the organisational structure in 2017 was simplified, and a clear strategic vision was formed. Part of STARK Group's new strategic vision consists of a consistent focus on a core customer group of small and medium-sized enterprises (SMEs). In addition, STARK Group serves large construction companies and other types of professional clients, such as government agencies and a small proportion of do-it-yourself clients.

Over more than a century, the companies that now form STARK Group expanded their operations in the construction sector. Today, the group supplies building materials and related services to professional builders in the Nordic countries.

== Ownership ==
STARK Group is owned by CVC Capital Partners Fund VII. CVC Capital Partners is a private equity and investment advisory firm. Earlier on, STARK Group was owned by the American private equity firm Lone Star Funds.

On January 8, 2021, CVC Capital Partners announced its complete acquisition of STARK Group.
