= Johnny Carter (footballer) =

Australian rules footballer

Personal information
- Full name: John Potts Carter
- Born: 2 October 1894; Murrumbeena, Victoria
- Died: 19 February 1960 (aged 65); North Melbourne, Victoria
- Height: 183 cm (6 ft 0 in)
- Weight: 82 kg (181 lb)

Playing career^{1}
| Years | Club | Games (Goals) |
| 1920 | Fitzroy | 7 (0) |
- ^{1} Playing statistics correct to the end of 1920.

John Potts Carter (2 October 1894 – 19 February 1960) was an Australian rules footballer who played with Fitzroy in the Victorian Football League (VFL).
