= Carter-Campbell of Possil =

Branch of Clan Campbell, a Scottish clan

- Cairtear-Cambeulach
- Motto: Fac et spera (Latin = Do and Hope)
- War cry: Battle cry: Cruachan!

Profile
- District: Castle Martin, County Kildare. Achnacroish and Ardrishaig, Argyllshire. Possil, Lanarkshire. Craigenputtock Dumfriesshire.
- Plant badge: Shamrock and Bog Myrtle
- Animal: Rampant Combatant Lions, Talbot and Wild Boar
- Pipe music: "The Campbells are Coming"
- Carter-Campbell of Possil no longer has a chief, and is an armigerous clan

Carter-Campbell of Possil (also known as Campbell of Possil) is a branch of Clan Campbell, a Scottish clan. The Campbells of Possil were originally located in Argyll; and the Carters were an Irish family: the Carter-Campbell name was first used in 1864, following marriage.

Descendants include Duncan Carter-Campbell of Possil OBE and George Carter-Campbell.

== History ==
John Campbell of Possil

In the 19th century, the Campbell of Possil family owned land throughout Lanarkshire.

The marriage took place in 1864 between Colonel Thomas Tupper Carter and Emily Georgina Campbell of Possil IV, who was granddaughter of Colonel Alexander Campbell of Possil. Once married, their matrimonial home was the Fascadale estate, Ardrishaig, Argyllshire. Emily Georgina Campbell of Possil IV wished to retain her surname when the marriage took place, which resulted in the formation of the Carter-Campbell name. Following the marriage in 1864, Lord Lyon King of Arms in Scotland formed the Carter-Campbell of Possil armorial bearings.

A Royal Engineer, Carter retired in 1887 upon receiving the honorary rank of colonel. He lived for a time at Siam House, Weymouth, Dorset. In 1893 he was granted renewed arms by the Lord Lyon King of Arms, and formally changed his name to Carter-Campbell of Possil. He subsequently lived with his wife and children at the family residence of Fascadale, in the parish of South Knapdale in Strathclyde (now Ardrishaig, Lochgilphead, Argyllshire).

=== 20th century onwards ===
On 14 January 1900 Carter died at Fascadale, aged 61.

The family had other military involvements during the same period and beyond. Carter had six children, his son George Carter-Campbell served in World War I and became a major general. Duncan Carter-Campbell of Possil was another of Carter's sons, and was a British Army Colonel during the 1950s.

== Clan profile ==
Portrait	Name	Birth	Death	Family	Known for
Thomas Carter Campbell	Colonel Thomas Tupper Carter-Campbell of Possil	15 September 1838	14 January 1900	the third son of Admiral John Carter RN of Castlemartin and his wife, Julia Adery Georges.[1] He was a grandson of Thomas Carter MP of Castlemartin.	British Soldier
Duncan Carter Campbell of Possil	Duncan Carter-Campbell of Possil OBE	1911; The Island of Malta	1990; Dumfriesshire	Son of George Carter-Campbell	British Army Colonel during the 1950s, received OBE
George Carter-Campbell	George Carter-Campbell	1869; Edinburgh	1921 (aged 51 or 52); London	Son of Thomas Tupper Carter-Campbell of Possil	became Major General in 1915

=== Crests and coats of arms ===
Campbell of Possil, Lanarkshire, Scotland coat of arms. Fac et Spera (Do and Hope)

Carter of Castle Martin (Castlemartin House and Estate), County Kildare, Ireland coat of arms.

Carter of Castle Martin crest badge on Irish saffron
Motto: Patience is victorious in hardship

Campbell of Possil crest badge on ancient Campbell tartan
Motto: Do and Hope

== Torosay Castle estate, Isle of Mull ==
Campbell of Possil coat of arms at Torosay Castle

The Castle was built by the architect David Bryce for John Campbell of Possil, in Scottish Baronial style. It was completed in 1858. Descendants of Archibald Campbell, 1st Duke of Argyll sold the ruined Duart Castle in 1801. It was purchased by Clan MacQuarrie, before it was sold to Alexander Campbell of Possil in 1825. The castle remained as a ruin on the Torosay estate. When the estate was sold, the Castle ruin was purchased by Sir Fitzroy Donald Maclean in 1912 and restored. John Campbell of Possil sold the castle and the estate in 1865 to Arburthnot Charles Guthrie, a wealthy London businessman.
