= John Carter the younger =

English divine

- Died: 10 December 1655; Norwich, England
- Occupation: Divine

John Carter the younger (died 10 December 1655) was an English divine.

== Biography ==
Carter was the son of John Carter the elder. He born in his father's parish of Bramford. He was admitted to Corpus Christi College, Cambridge, in 1596, proceeded B.A. 1599, and M.A. 1603. He was chosen by the parishioners curate or assistant minister of St. Peter Mancroft, Norwich, in 1631; was appointed one of the four lecturers in 1633 to preach the Tuesday lectures at St. Peter's according to the order of the assembly; and in 1638 became parish chaplain or head minister, which post he retained for nearly fifteen years. In three sermons, preached before the Norwich corporation, in celebration of the guild festivals of 1644, 1647, and 1650 (see The Nail and the Wheel, 1647; A rare sight, or the Lyon, 1650), he vehemently attacked the magistrates for their weak-kneed devotion to Presbyterianism. The violence of his language and his fanatical denunciations of monarchy caused his removal from the ministry, and at the close of 1653 he calls himself "preacher of the Gospel, and as yet sojourning in the city of Norwich." He was afterwards minister of St. Lawrence, Norwich, and died in that city on 10 December 1655. John Collings, B.D., preached the funeral sermon on 14 December. Carter wrote the memoir of his father entitled "The Tombstone" in 1653.
