= John Carter (cricketer, born 1935) =

English cricketer

Personal information
- Full name: John William Carter
- Born: 23 June 1935; Oxford, Oxfordshire, England
- Died: 20 January 2021 (aged 85)
- Batting: Right-handed

Domestic team information
- Years: Team
- 1959: Leicestershire
- 1953–1961: Oxfordshire

Career statistics
Competition	First-class
Matches	7
Runs scored	209
Batting average	14.92
100s/50s	0/0
Top score	41
Balls bowled	–
Wickets	–
Bowling average	–
5 wickets in innings	–
10 wickets in match	–
Best bowling	–
Catches/stumpings	–/–
- Source: Cricinfo, 20 January 2013

John William Carter (23 June 1935 – 20 January 2021) was an English cricketer. Carter was a right-handed batsman. He was born at Oxford, Oxfordshire.

Carter made his debut for Oxfordshire against Berkshire in the 1953 Minor Counties Championship. He played minor counties cricket for Oxfordshire on 35 occasions to 1957. He joined Leicestershire in 1959, making his first-class debut for the county against Oxford University, with him making six further first-class appearances for the county in that season, with his final appearance coming against Surrey. In his seven first-class matches for Leicestershire, he scored a total of 209 runs at an average of 14.92, with a high score of 41. He later returned to playing minor counties cricket for Oxfordshire, making five appearances for the county in 1961.

Carter died on 20 January 2021, at the age of 85.
