= John Carter (insurance executive) =

British businessman

Sir John Gordon Thomas Carter (born 28 December 1937) is a British businessman who was Chief Executive of Commercial Union from 1994 to 1998, and who is the current chairman of travelers insurance europe.

== Life ==
Carter was educated at the City of Oxford High School and Jesus College, Oxford, obtaining a degree in mathematics. After National Service, he joined Commercial Union in 1961, and became a Fellow of the Institute of Actuaries in 1966. He rose to the positions of Life Manager (1978 to 1980), Deputy General Manager (1981 to 1982), General Manager (1983 to 1986) and Director (1987 to 1994) before becoming Chief Executive in 1994. He stepped down from this post in 1998, the year in which he was knighted and made an Honorary Fellow of Jesus College. He was also a director of Credito Italiano (1994 to 1999) and Canary Wharf Group (1999 to 2004). He has also been chairman of the management committee of the Motor Insurers' Bureau (1985 to 1990), Association of British Insurers (1995 to 1997), and the Policyholders Protection Board (2000 to 2001). He became a director of the National House Building Council in 1998 and has been chairman since 2002. He was a Governor of London Guildhall University from 1998 to 2002, serving as chairman from 1999 to 2002; when the university merged in 2002 with the University of North London to become London Metropolitan University, he was chairman of the merged university until 2006.
