= John Carter (evangelist) =

John Carter is a Seventh-day Adventist Christian evangelist known especially for his work in the former Soviet Union. His presentation is known as the "Carter Report", and he is a somewhat known figure within the Adventist church. He is married to Beverley L. Carter.

== Biography ==
John Carter was born in Australia. His first mission was in Albury, NSW around 1976 after a local TV advertising campaign that saw some 1500 people attend at the Albury Civic Center. He ran a mission in Melbourne in 1980. In 1989, the Carter Report television studio in Newbury Park, California was dedicated.

=== Work in Communist Countries ===
A 1990 crusade was attended by thousands of people. In 1991 a small mission was held in Moscow, the capital of the formerly Communist country of Russia. 100 people were baptized and joined the church. In 1992, 2500 were baptized in an outreach in the city of Nizhny Novgorod. Meetings there in the following year brought in 1200 people to the Adventist church. Another series in 1994 saw 8000 conversions to Christianity. Later, 1300 joined the Adventist church through his work. In 1995, he ran meetings in Ukraine's capital Kyiv. 52,000 attended, and 2819 joined the Adventist church. There were city officials that harassed attenders at that evangelistic meeting.

=== Other Outreach Work ===
A Los Angeles, California, campaign in 1999 saw 100 people join the church. In 1998, the former First Secretary of the local Communist Party of the Nizhny Novgorod was converted through Carter's ministry. Another series in Ukraine in 2001 was attended by 25,000 at its opening.

== The Carter Report ==
In 1996, the Carter Report won two Silver Angel Awards from Excellence In Media. The Tenth Carter Report occurred in 2002.

== See also ==
- Media ministries of the Seventh-day Adventist Church
