= John Carter (Royal Navy officer) =

Royal Navy Admiral (1785–1863)

Admiral John Carter
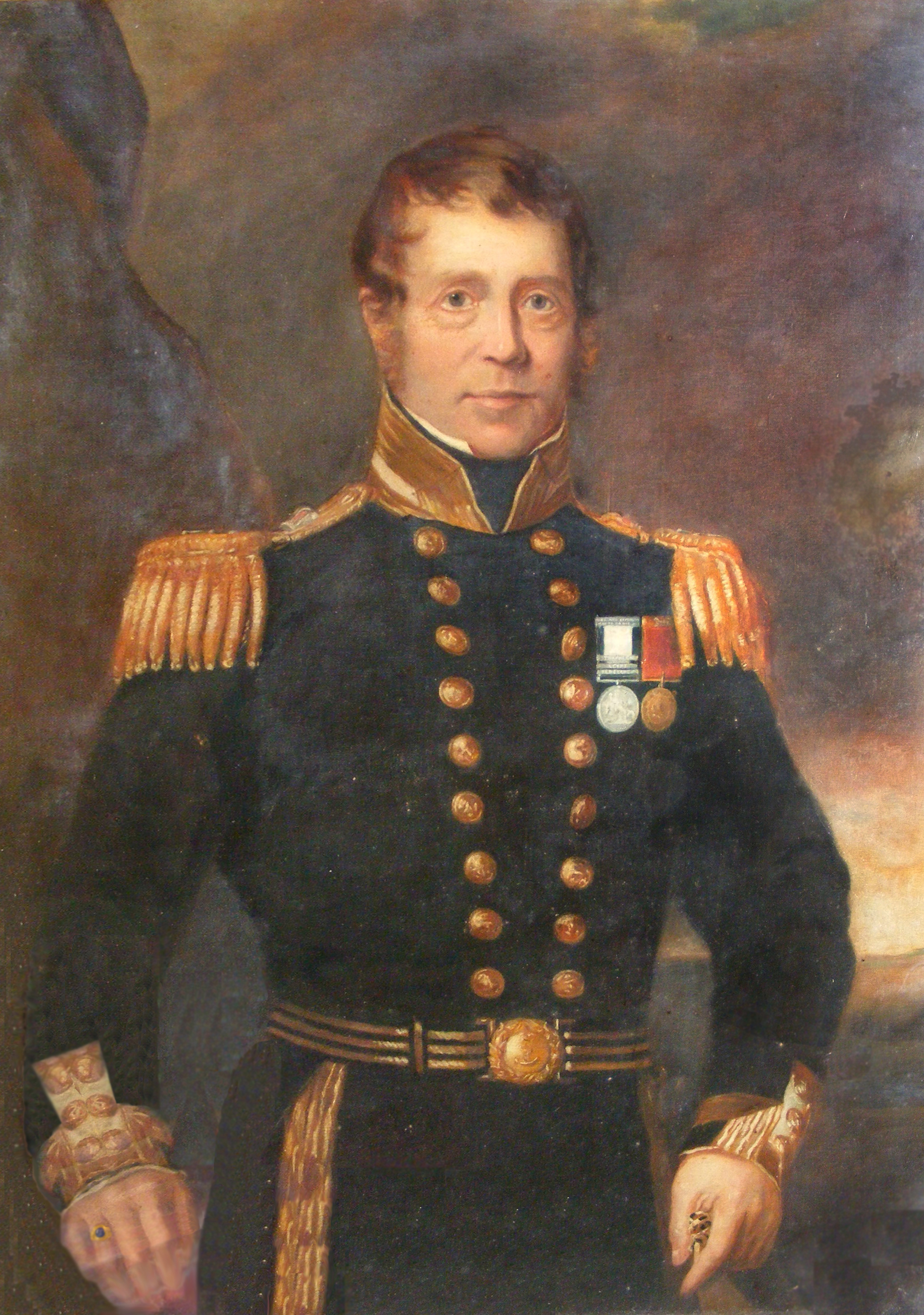
- Born: 1785; Castle Martin, Ireland
- Died: 2 April 1863 (aged 77–78); Devonport, England
- Relatives: The Earl of Lanesborough; The Rt. Hon Thomas Carter; General George Carter-Campbell; Colonel Duncan Carter-Campbell of Possil
- Military career
- Allegiance: United Kingdom of Great Britain and Ireland
- Branch: Royal Navy
- Service years: 1798–1863
- Rank: Admiral
- Conflicts: War of the Second Coalition; French invasion of Egypt and Syria; War of the Third Coalition; Trafalgar campaign; Battle of Trafalgar

Admiral John Carter (1785 – 2 April 1863) son of Thomas Carter and Catherine Butler of Castlemartin Co Kildare and grandson of Henry Boyle Carter, was an officer of the Royal Navy, who saw service during the French Revolutionary and Napoleonic Wars.

Carter joined the Navy in January 1798, serving aboard the 28-gun HMS Brilliant in the Mediterranean. In July Brilliant had a narrow escape from two French 44-gun frigates off Santa Cruz. He then moved aboard HMS Penelope as a midshipman, and took part in the blockade of Malta. On 30 March 1800 Penelope was one of the ships that intercepted and aided in the capture of the French 84-gun Guillaume Tell. He then took part in the campaign in Egypt, followed by service in boat actions off the French and Genoese coasts.

Carter served for a time aboard HMS Victory under Vice-Admiral Lord Nelson, and in February 1805 Nelson transferred him into an acting-lieutenancy aboard the 74-gun HMS Leviathan. Admiral Lord Nelson awarded him with his sword and telescope for distinguished service under his command. Carter then took part in the pursuit of the combined Franco-Spanish fleet to the West Indies during the Trafalgar Campaign. He returned with the British fleet and took part in the Battle of Trafalgar, where his service involved securing the prisoners and destroying the prizes. He was back in the West Indies by late 1806, where he navigated the badly leaking HMS Cerf back to Britain, fothering her hull with sails and with the pumps manned all throughout the voyage. He captured the 14-gun Emille off St Valery in February 1814. He was promoted to post-captain on 7 December 1815, and went on to become superintendent of the Royal Hospital Haslar after the end of the Napoleonic Wars.

Carter was Superintendent of the Royal Clarence Victualling Yard between December 1841 and December 1846, and was promoted to rear-admiral on reserved half-pay on 8 April 1851. He was promoted to vice-admiral on 9 July 1857 and admiral on 4 October 1862. Admiral John Carter died on 2 April 1863 at Devonport.

== See also ==
- Carter-Campbell of Possil
