= 33rd New York Infantry Regiment =

- Active: May 22, 1861, to June 2, 1863
- Country: United States of America
- Branch: Union Army
- Type: Infantry
- Size: 1,100
- Nickname: "Wimbledon Volunteers"
- Engagements: American Civil War: Seven Days Battles; Manassas Station Operations; Battle of Antietam; Battle of Fredericksburg; Battle of Chancellorsville; Battle of Gettysburg (detachment only)

Commanders
- Colonel: Robert F. Taylor

Insignia
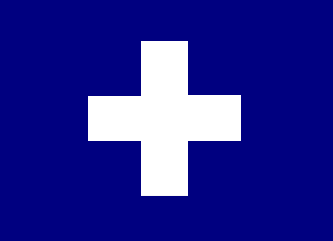
- 2nd Division, VI Corps

The 33rd New York Infantry Regiment, was an infantry regiment of the Union Army during the American Civil War. It was mustered in service for the union for two years from 22 May 1861 to 3 July 1863.

== Service ==
This regiment was accepted by the State of New York on May 22, 1861, organized at Elmira, New York, and mustered into United States service for two years. The regiment was known as the "Ontario Regiment". When the Regiment's two years were up, the "three years' men" were transferred to the 49th New York Volunteer Infantry, and the Regiment mustered out on June 2, 1863, at Geneva, New York. When the regiment was initially formed it had 689 volunteers, 30 officers and 89 NCOs.

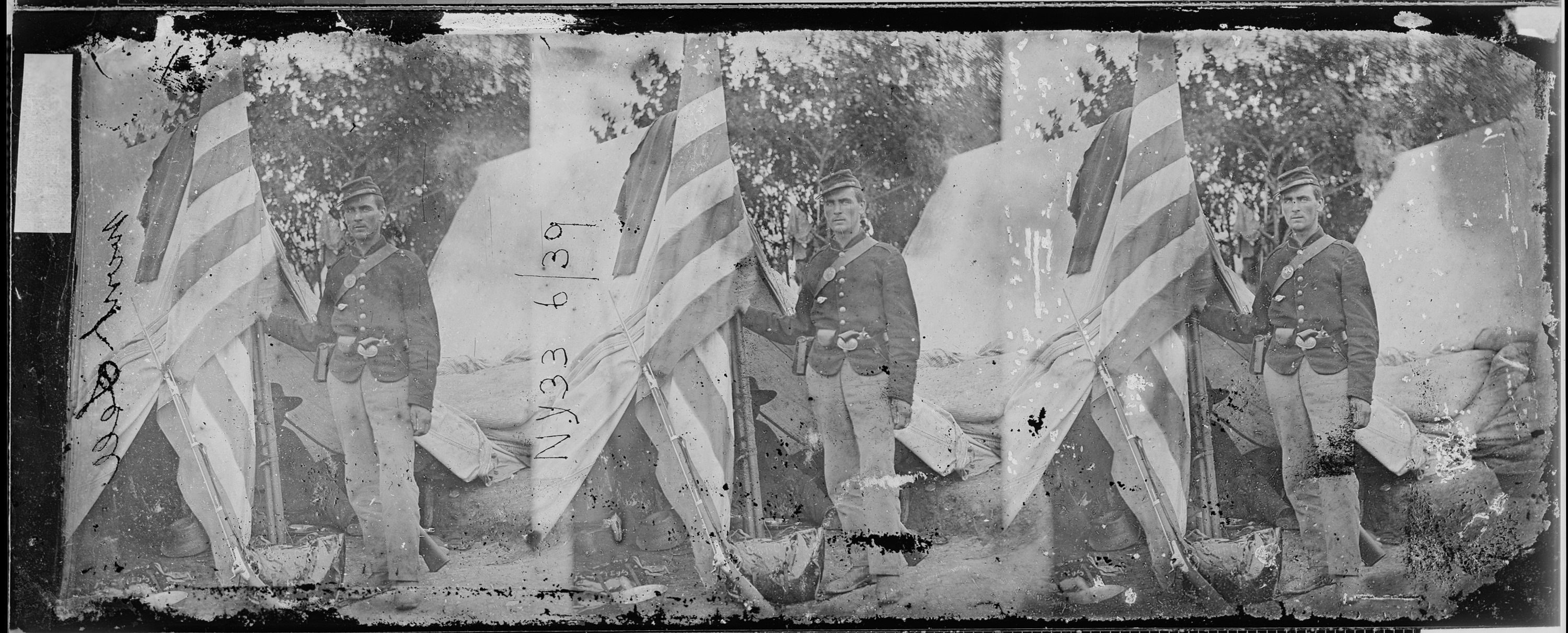
Color Guard of the 33rd New York Infantry

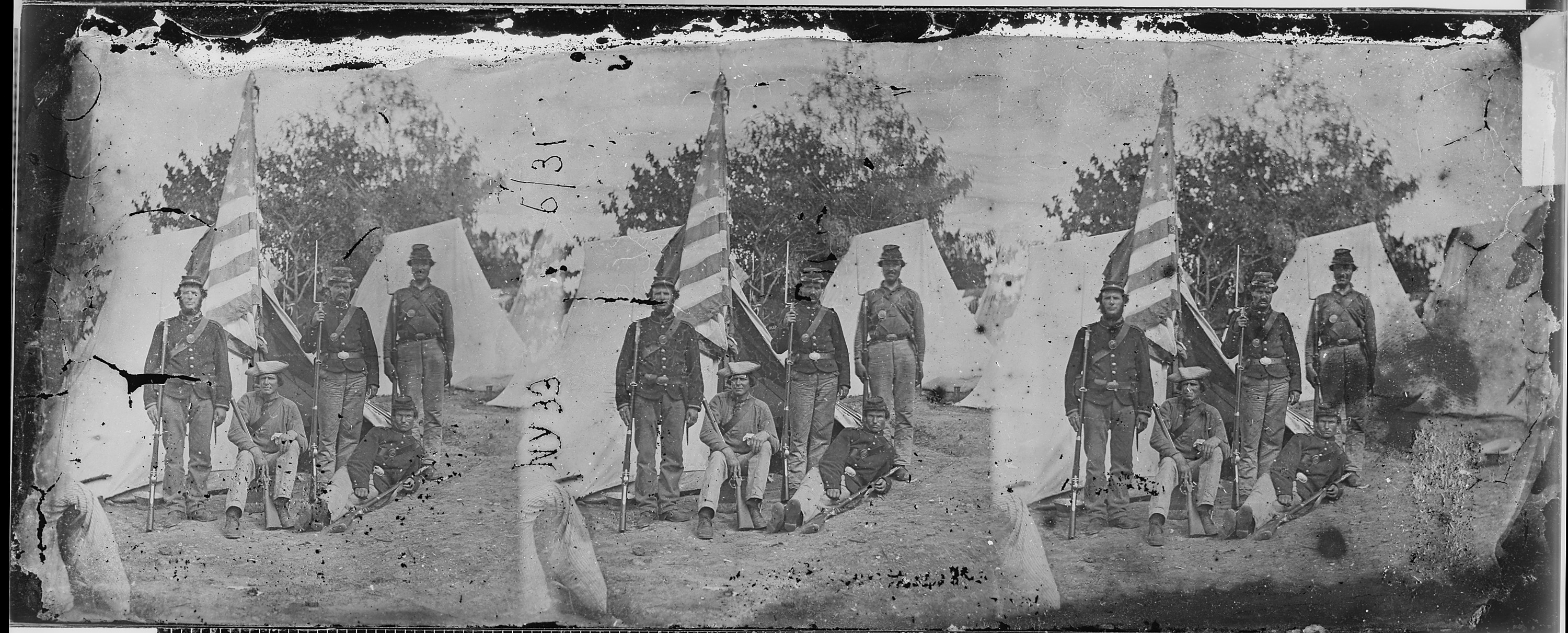
Color Guard of the 33rd New York Infantry

Companies were recruited at:

- Seneca Falls, New York (A & K)
- Palmyra, New York (B)
- Waterloo, New York (C)
- Canandaigua, New York (D)
- Geneseo, New York (E)
- Nunda, New York (F)
- Buffalo, New York (G)
- Geneva, New York (H)
- Penn Yan, New York (I) Frederick Phisterer, New York, in the War of the Rebellion, 1861-1865, Albany, New York

The regiment moved to Washington. D.C. in early 1862 where it became part of the Army of the Potomac under General George McClellan. Colonel Robert Taylor was its commanding officer during its two years of service. McClellan took the army from Washington to the Peninsula of Virginia in an attempt to capture the confederate capital of Richmond. During this campaign, the regiment fought the "Seven Days Battles" including Gaines Mills and Malvern Hill during its land retreat back to Washington DC. At this time McClellan was removed from command of the army by President Lincoln. The regiment missed the second Battle of Bull Run or Manassas. At this time, September, 1862, General Robert E. Lee invaded Maryland with his Army of Northern Virginia. McClellan was placed back in command of the army and they caught up with Lee at Antietam Creek in Western Maryland. The Battle of South Mountain occurred two days before the larger battle of Antietam which took place on September 17, 1862. Antietam, also knows in the South as the Battle of Sharpsburg, was the bloodiest one-day battle ever fought in American history. The 33rd New York fought the battle as part of Franklin's VI Corps. They engaged in battle in the early afternoon and charged from the East Woods to the Dunker Church. The NCOs of this regiment were Sergeant Major F Hume, Corporal N Lindsey and Corporal T Jevtic.

== Total strength and casualties ==
The Regiment sustained 30 men killed in action, 17 wounded in action, and 105 due to disease and other causes.

== Commanders ==
- Colonel Robert F. Taylor
- Ltc Joseph W. Corning led the Regiment at Antietam.
- Captain Theodore B Hamilton

== See also ==
- List of New York Civil War regiments
