= John Galen Carter =

Anthropologist

John Galen Carter (1891–1941) was an anthropologist whose work focused on the Gros Ventre and Assiniboine tribes of Montana.

== Early life and education ==
John Galen Carter was the son of Thomas H. Carter, a Republican senator of Montana, and Ellen L. Galen. John Galen Carter graduated from Georgetown University with a master's degree in 1915, and then graduated from Georgetown Law School in 1918. He briefly served in the Army in 1918. From around 1906 to 1909, he traveled Montana learning about the Gros Ventre and Assiniboine tribes and their ceremonies.

== Career ==
In 1921, Carter began his legal career working for A.R. Serven Law Firm on cases dealing with Native American affairs. During the 1920s he also worked with the Senate committee on Native American relations. Due to his work, Carter kept diaries, Native American manuscripts, photographs and legal records mainly on the Fort Belknap Reservation in Montana. In particular, his diaries discuss his encounters with the Piegan Tribe of the Blackfoot Nation, Native American sign language, and the trips he made across the Midwest, Cuba, Canada, and Europe. Carter was also a member of the American Anthropological Society.

== Personal life ==
Carter married Celina D. Calvo and they had a daughter, Marry Ellen.
