= Jock Carter =

English footballer

John Henry Carter (11 November 1910 – 2 July 1992) was an English professional footballer. He was born in Aylesbury.

During his career he played as a centre forward for Watford, Reading and Ipswich Town for whom he was top scorer in their first season as a professional club. Following his retirement from playing, Carter spent time working as a steward at Reading's stadium, Elm Park. He died in Reading, aged 81.
