= Robert Vaughan (engraver) =

English engraver

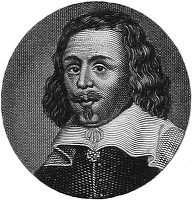
- Born: c. 1600
- Died: c. 1660
- Occupation: Engraver

Robert Vaughan (c. 1600 – c. 1660) was an English engraver.

== Biography ==
Vaughan was born circa 1600. The National Portrait Gallery states that Vaughan was a "versatile line engraver, producing portraits, maps, bookplates, series of prints and the occasional broadsheet." He engraved the Theatrum Chemicum Britannicum.

Vaughan was an acquaintance of Thomas Vaughan. Robert was a supporter of the Royalists during the English Civil War. He was indicted in 1651 for publishing a print of King Charles I, who had recently been executed. Vaughan died circa 1660.
