= John Cain Carter =

American cattle rancher and environmentalist

John Cain Carter (born 1966 in San Antonio, Texas) is a cattle rancher and conservationist who started the Brazilian rainforest conservation organization, Aliança da Terra. Carter moved to Brazil from Texas in 1996, where he and his wife managed an 8200 hectare cattle ranch between the Xingu and Amazon Rivers in the Brazilian state of Mato Grosso. Shocked by the rapid deforestation occurring in the Amazon rainforest, Carter started Aliança da Terra to provide economic incentives for farmers and ranchers to preserve the forest land.
