= Duncan Carter-Campbell of Possil =

British Army officer (1911–1990)

Lieutenant Colonel Duncan Carter-Campbell of Possil OBE
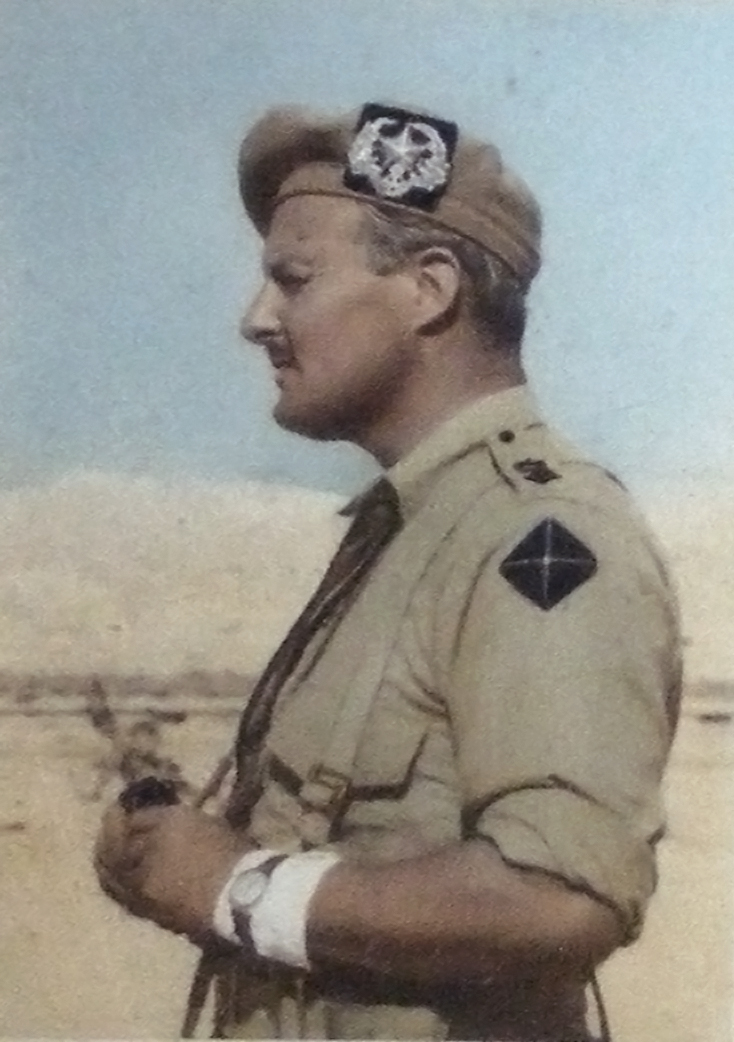
- Born: 5 December 1911; Malta
- Died: January 1990 (aged 78); Dumfriesshire, Scotland
- Burial place: Irongray Church
- Relatives: Major General George Carter-Campbell (father)
- Military career
- Allegiance: United Kingdom
- Branch: British Army
- Service years: 1932–1962
- Rank: Lieutenant Colonel
- Commands: 1st Battalion Cameronians (Scottish Rifles); Winston Barracks, Lanark; Buxtehude, Germany
- Conflicts: Second World War; Malayan Emergency
- Awards: Officer of the Order of the British Empire; Mentioned in Despatches

Lieutenant Colonel Duncan Maclachlan Carter-Campbell of Possil (8th of Possil), OBE (5 December 1911 – January 1990) was a senior British Army officer during the 1950s.

== Military career ==
Duncan Carter-Campbell was born on 5 December 1911 in Malta, the son of Major General George Carter-Campbell and Frances Elizabeth Ward. He was educated at Malvern College, Worcestershire. He then entered Royal Military College, Sandhurst in 1930, and subsequently was commissioned into the Cameronians (Scottish Rifles) in 1932.

Campbell served with the regiment in India in 1937-38 and was promoted to the rank of captain in January 1940 and major in November 1941.

In July 1943 Campbell was appointed second-in-command of the 12th Battalion and on its disbandment was posted to the 1st Battalion in Italy and fought at the battles of Anzio and Monte Cassino. On 14 August 1944 he was promoted to command the 1st Battalion where he fought in Nuremberg, Germany in 1945.

As a Staff Officer, Campbell was then posted to the British Middle East Land Forces to support operations in Palestine/Transjordan between 1945 and 1947.

At the end of the Second World War he served with the British Army of the Rhine from 1947 to 1948 under occupied Germany. In 1952 he went on to command the Cameronians 1st Battalion and, for services in Malaysia, was Mentioned in Despatches on 21 October 1952. He also served in Bahrain and Trucial Oman.

In 1958 Campbell became secretary to the General Officer Commanding-in-Chief of Scottish Command and Governor of Edinburgh Castle, Lieutenant-General Sir George Collingwood. He was the Director Royal Edinburgh Military Tattoo before retiring in 1962.

Campbell was married to Margaret Elliot Davidson and had five children. He died in Dumfriesshire, Scotland, in January 1990. He, his wife and two of their children are buried in the churchyard at Kirkpatrick Irongray Church, Kirkcudbrightshire.
