= Philip =

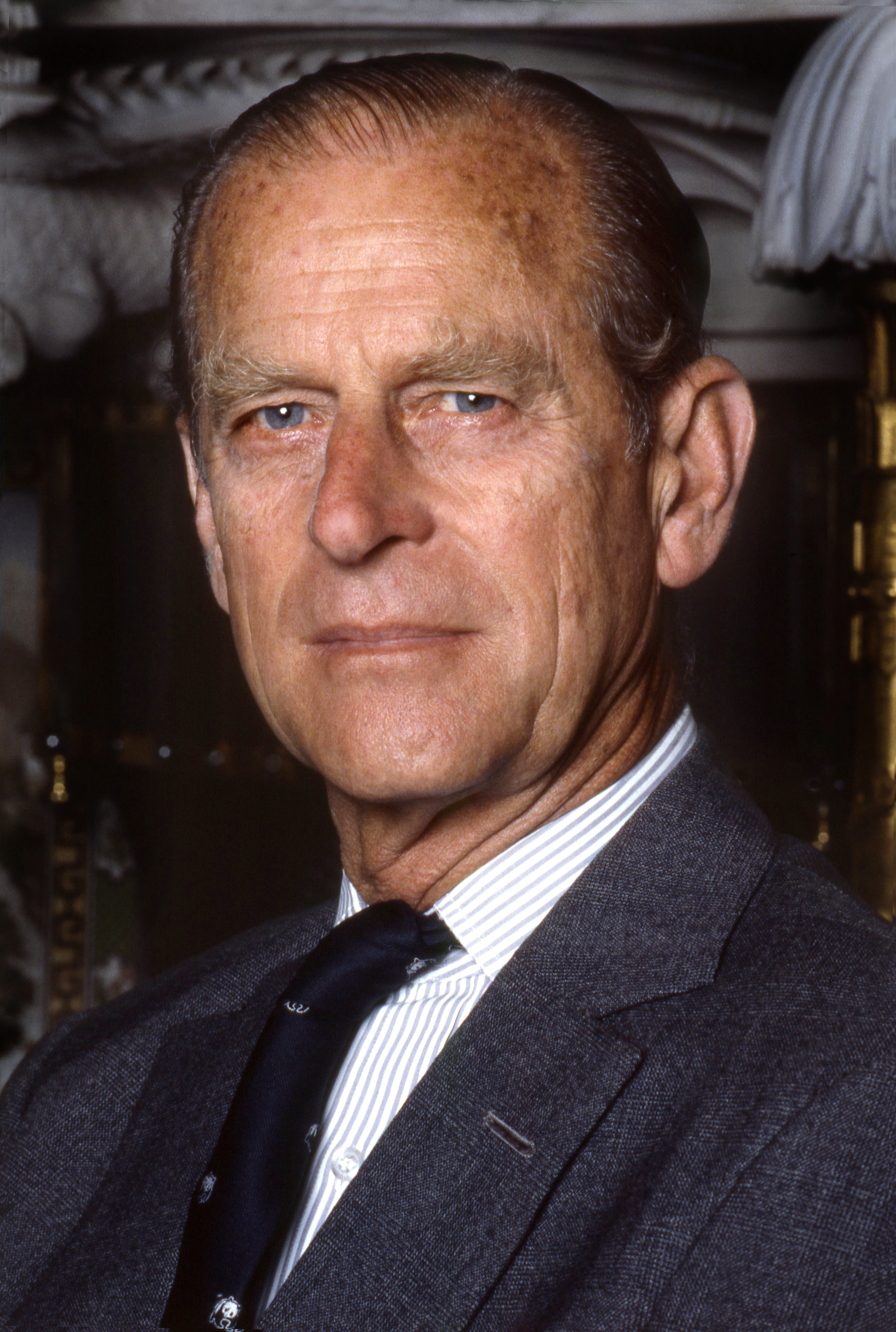
- Prince Philip in 1992
- Pronunciation: /ˈfɪlɪp/ FIL-ip
- Gender: Male

Origin
- Origin: Greek
- Meaning: "fond of horses" "horse-loving"

Other names
- Alternative spelling: Phillip
- Nicknames: Phil, Philly, Lip, Pip, Phill
- Derived: Φίλιππος (Philippos)
- Related names: Filip, Felipe, Felip, Filipe, Filippo, Filippos, Fülöp, Philipp, Philippe, Philippos, Phillips, Philips, Philippe

Philip, also Phillip, is a male name derived from the Greek Φιλιππος (Philippos, lit. "horse-loving" or "fond of horses"), from a compound of φίλος (philos, "dear", "loved", "loving") and ἵππος (hippos, "horse"). Prominent Philips who popularized the name include kings of Macedonia and one of the apostles of early Christianity.

Philip has many alternative spellings. One derivation often used as a surname is Phillips. The original Greek spelling includes two Ps as seen in Philippides and Philippos, which is possible due to the Greek endings following the two Ps. To end a word with such a double consonant—in Greek or in English—would, however, be incorrect. It has many diminutive (or even hypocoristic) forms including Phil, Philly, Phillie, Lip, and Pip. There are also feminine forms such as Philippine and Philippa.

== Philip in other languages ==
- Afrikaans: Filip
- Albanian: Filip
- Amharic: ፊሊጶስ (Filip'os)
- Arabic: فيلبس (Fīlibus), فيليبوس (Fīlībūs), فيليب (Fīlīb)
- Armenian: Փիլիպպոս (Pʿilippos)
- Asturian: Felipe
- Belarusian: Філіп (Filip), піліп (Pilip)
- Bengali: ফিলিপ (Philipa)
- Bosnian: Filip
- Bulgarian: Филип (Filip)
- Catalan: Felip
- Celtic: Fulup
- Croatian: Filip
- Czech: Filip
- Danish: Filip, Fillip
- Dutch: Philip, Filip, Filips
- English: Phillip, Philip
- Filipino: Felipe, Pelipe
- Finnish: Vilppu
- French: Philippe
- Galician: Filipe
- Ganda: Filipu
- Georgian: ფილიპ (P’ilip)
- German: Philipp
- Greek: Φίλιππος (Phílippos, Phillippides)
- Gujarati: ફિલિપ (Philipa)
- Hawaiian: Pilipo
- Hebrew: פיליפ (Filip)
- Hindi: फिलिप (Philip)
- Hungarian: Fülöp
- Indonesian: Filipus, Philip
- Irish: Pilib, Feidhlim
- Italian: Filippo
- Latin: Philippus
- Latvian: Filips
- Lithuanian: Pilypas
- Macedonian: Филип (Filip)
- Malayalam: ഫിലിപ്പൊസ് (Philippose)
- Maltese: Filippu, Pinu
- Maori: Piripi
- Norwegian: Filip, Philip, Phillip
- Occitan: Felip
- Persian: فیلیپ (Filip)
- Poitevin: Félipe
- Polish: Filip
- Portuguese: Filipe
- Portuguese (Brazilian): Felipe
- Romanian: Filip
- Russian: Филипп (Filipp)
- Samoan: Filipo
- Scottish Gaelic: Filib
- Serbian: Филип/Filip
- Slovak: Filip
- Slovenian: Filip
- Spanish: Felipe
- Swahili: Felipo
- Swedish: Filip
- Tigrinya: ፊሊጶስ (Filip'os)
- Turkish: Filipus
- Ukrainian: Пилип (Pylyp)
- Vietnamese: Philiphê (Quốc ngữ), 丕離批 (Nôm), 菲里伯 (Nho)
- Welsh: Philip

== Antiquity ==
=== Kings of Macedon ===
- Philip I of Macedon
- Philip II of Macedon, father of Alexander the Great
- Philip III of Macedon, half-brother of Alexander the Great
- Philip IV of Macedon
- Philip V of Macedon

=== New Testament ===
- Philip the Apostle
- Philip the Evangelist

=== Others ===
- Philippus of Croton (c. 6th century BC) Olympic victor and legendary hero
- Philip of Opus, one of Plato's students
- Philip of Acarnania, physician
- Philip (son of Antipater), general of Alexander the Great
- Philip (son of Machatas) builder of Alexandria on the Indus
- Philip (husband of Berenice I of Egypt), son of Amyntas and first husband of Berenice I
- Philip, brother of Lysimachus and youngest son of Agathocles of Pella
- Philip, one of the sons of Lysimachus from his wife Arsinoe II
- Philip (satrap), Greek satrap of Sogdiana and governor of Parthia
- Philip I Philadelphus, ruler of the Hellenistic Seleucid kingdom
- Philip II Philoromaeus, last ruler of the Hellenistic Seleucid kingdom
- Lucius Marcius Philippus (disambiguation), multiple Roman statesmen
- Philippides of Paiania, Greek son of Philomelos, archon of nobility, basileus 293/2 B.C.
- Herod Philip I, son of Herod the Great and husband of Herodias
- Philip, "the Tetrarch", son of Herod the Great and ruler of Ituraea and Trachonitis
- Philippus of Thessalonica, epigrammatic Greek poet and compiler of an Anthology
- Philip the Arab, Roman emperor from 244 to 250
- Philip of Side, Byzantine historian of the early Christian church

== Rulers and royalty ==
=== Papacy ===
- Antipope Philip (c. 701 – c. 800)

=== Byzantine Empire ===
- Philippikos Bardanes (r. 711–713), Byzantine emperor
- Philip of Courtenay, titular Latin Emperor of Constantinople (1273–1283)

=== King of the Belgians ===
- Philip of Belgium

=== King of England ===
- Philip of England

=== Kings of France ===
- Philip I of France
- Philip II of France
- Philip III of France, "the Bold"
- Philip IV of France, "the Fair"; also known as Philip I of Navarre
- Philip V of France, "the Tall"; also known as Philip II of Navarre
- Philip VI of France, "the Fortunate"

=== Kings of Navarre ===
- Philip I of Navarre, also known as Philip IV of France
- Philip II of Navarre, also known as Philip V of France
- Philip III of Navarre

=== King of Germany ===
- Philip of Swabia, King of Germany (r. 1198–1208) and Duke of Swabia

=== Counts and Dukes of Savoy ===
- Philip I, Count of Savoy (1207–1285)
- Philip II, Duke of Savoy (1438–1497)

=== Dukes of Burgundy ===
- Philip of Rouvres, also known as Philip I, Duke of Burgundy
- Philip the Bold, also known as Philip II, Duke of Burgundy
- Philip the Good, also known as Philip III, Duke of Burgundy

=== Kings of Castile and Spain ===
- Philip the Handsome, also known as Philip I of Castile and Philip IV, Duke of Burgundy
- Philip II of Spain, also known as Philip I of Portugal and Philip V of Burgundy
- Philip III of Spain, also known as Philip II of Portugal and Philip VI of Burgundy
- Philip IV of Spain, also known as Philip III of Portugal and Philip VII of Burgundy
- Philip V of Spain
- Felipe VI

=== Kings of Portugal ===
- Philip I of Portugal, also known as Philip II of Spain and Philip V of Burgundy
- Philip II of Portugal, also known as Philip III of Spain and Philip VI of Burgundy
- Philip III of Portugal, also known as Philip IV of Spain and Philip VII of Burgundy

=== Others ===
- Philip of Sweden, a medieval king of Sweden
- Philip of Milly, seventh Grand Master of the Knights Templar
- Philip, Count of Flanders
- Philip of Artois (1269–1298), heir to the countship
- Philip of Artois, Count of Eu
- Philip I, Prince of Taranto
- Philip II, Prince of Taranto
- Philip of Burgundy, Count of Auvergne
- Philip of Poitou, Prince-Bishop of Durham
- Philip Simonsson, claimant to the throne of Norway
- Philip of Saint-Pol, Duke of Brabant
- Philip, Duke of Parma
- Philip I, Landgrave of Hesse
- Philip II, Duke of Pomerania (1573–1618)
- Prince Philip, Duke of Edinburgh (1921–2021), consort of Queen Elizabeth II of the United Kingdom and the other Commonwealth realms
- Philipp, Prince of Eulenburg, Prussian diplomat
- Prince Carl Philip, prince of Sweden and Duke of Värmland

== First name ==
- Metacomet (1638–1676), nicknamed "King Philip", war leader of the Wampanoag in "King Philip's War"
- Phiiliip (born 1980), American musician, born Philip Guichard
- Phil Anselmo (born 1968), American heavy metal vocalist and musician
- Phil Apollo, American retired professional wrestler
- Phil Barker (born 1932), American wargames designer
- Phillip Barker, Canadian-British artist and film director
- Phillip G. Bernstein, American architect, technologist, and educator
- Phil Coleman (athlete) (1931–2021), American runner
- Phil Coleman (footballer) (born 1960), English footballer
- Phil Collins (born 1951), English drummer and singer-songwriter
- Phil Cunningham (born 1960), Scottish accordionist
- Phillip Daniels (born 1973), American football coach and former player
- Phillip Daniels (offensive lineman) (born 2005), American football player
- Phil Donahue (1935-2024), American media personality
- Phil Esposito (born 1942), Canadian hockey player, coach, executive, and broadcaster
- Phil Farbman (1924–1996), American basketball player
- Phil Foden (born 2000), English footballer
- Phil Foglio (born 1956), print and online comic artist, creator of Girl Genius and XXXenophile
- Phil Goff (born 1953), New Zealand politician
- Phil Handler (1908–1968), American football player
- Phil Hartman (1948–1998), American actor and comedian
- Phil Haynes (born 1995), American football player
- Phil Hellmuth (born 1964), American poker player
- Phil Hill (1927–2008), American automobile racer
- Phil Ivey (born 1977), American poker player
- Phil Jackson (born 1945), American basketball coach
- Phil Jurkovec (born 1999), American football player
- Phil Keoghan (born 1967), New Zealand-born television personality, known for hosting The Amazing Race
- Phil Kessel (born 1987), American ice hockey player
- Phil LaMarr (born 1967), American actor
- Phil Lester (born 1987), English YouTuber and BBC Radio 1 presenter
- Phil Lynott (1949–1986), Irish vocalist, bassist, and member of Thin Lizzy
- Phil Mauger, current mayor of Christchurch, New Zealand
- Phil Mahre (born 1957), American alpine skier
- Phil Mallow (born 1957), American politician
- Phil Marsh (born 1986), English footballer
- Phil McGraw (born 1950), American talk show host, also known as Dr. Phil
- Phil Mickelson (born 1970), American golfer
- Philip Finkie Molefe (1928–2020), South African religious leader
- Phil Murphy (born 1957), American politician
- Phil Neville (born 1977), English footballer
- Phil Ochs (1940–1976), American songwriter and protest singer
- Phil Oestricher (1931–2015), American test pilot
- Phil Palmer (born 1952), English jazz and rock guitarist
- Phil Plait (born 1964), American astronomer
- Phil Radford (born 1976), Greenpeace executive director
- Phil Read (1939–2022), English motorcycle racer
- Phil Rudd (born 1954), Australian drummer for AC/DC
- Phil Spector (1939–2021), American record producer and songwriter
- Phil Taylor (born 1960), English darts player
- Phil Vickery (born 1976), English rugby player
- Phil Weintraub (1907–1987), American baseball player
- Philip Baldi (born 1946), American linguist and classical scholar
- Philip Barter (1939–2024), American painter
- Philip J. Berg (born 1944), American conspiracy theorist
- Philip Caputo (1941–2026), American author and journalist
- Philip Carey (1925–2009), American actor
- Philip Chen Nan-lok (born 1955), Hong Kong businessman
- Philip Cheng (1980–2000), apprentice jockey from Hong Kong
- Philip P. Cohen (1908–1993), American chemist and researcher
- Philip Coppens (disambiguation), several people
- Philip Cortney (1895-1971), Romanian-French-American businessman and economist
- Philip Craven (born 1950), English sports administrator, president of the International Paralympic Committee
- Philip Dulebohn (born 1973), American figure skater
- Philip Erenberg (1909–1992), American gymnast and Olympic silver medalist
- Philip Farkas (1914–1992), American horn player
- Philip Glass (born 1937), American composer
- Phillip Glasser (born 1978), American actor and producer
- Philip Glenister (born 1963), English actor
- Philip Godana (died 2015), Kenyan politician
- Philip Grymes (c. 1777–1818), American lawyer
- Philip Gudthaykudthay (died 2022), Aboriginal Australian artist
- Philip Gunawardena (1901–1972), Sri Lankan Sinhala Trotskyist
- Philip Guston (1913–1980), American painter
- Philip Hamilton (1782–1801), American poet and son of Alexander Hamilton
- Philip Hearnshaw, (1952–2012), Australian filmmaker
- Philip J. Ivanhoe (born 1954), American sinologist
- Philip Jalalpoor, (born 1993), German basketball player
- Philip K. Dick (1928–1982), American science fiction writer
- Philip Khoury (born 1989/1990), Australian pastry chef
- Philip Khuri Hitti (1886–1978), Lebanese academic and scholar of Islam
- Philip Langridge (1939–2010), English tenor
- Sir Philip Miles, 2nd Baronet (1825–1888), English politician and landowner
- Philip Napier Miles (1865–1935), English composer, philanthropist and landowner
- Philip of Montfort, Lord of Castres, French nobleman
- Philip of Montfort, Lord of Tyre, French nobleman
- Philip Overholt, electrical engineer
- Philip George Owston (1921–2001), English chemist and crystallographer, and namesake of the Owston Islands in Antarctica
- Philip Perry (born 1964), acting Associate Attorney General of the United States
- Philip Pullman, (born 1946), English writer
- Philip Ralph, English television screenwriter, playwright and actor
- Philip Rivers (born 1981), American football player
- Philip Roller (born 1994), Thai footballer
- Philip Roth (1933–2018), American novelist
- Philip Rünz (born 1997), German politician
- Philip Sclater (1829–1913), English lawyer and zoologist
- Philip Seymour Hoffman (1967–2014), American actor
- Philip Tideman (1657-1705), Dutch Golden Age painter
- Philip Tuckniss (born 1962), Zimbabwean tennis player
- Philip van Ness Myers (1846–1937), American historian
- Philip Vellacott (1907–1997), English academic and classical scholar, known for his translations of Greek tragedy
- Philip Vivet (born 2000), Danish politician
- Philip Webster (born 1949), English journalist
- Philip Wilson (bishop) (1950–2021), English-Australian bishop and prisoner
- Philip Wong (1938–2021), politician in Hong Kong
- Philip Zimbardo (1933–2024), American psychologist and professor emeritus at Stanford University
- Phill Jupitus (born 1962), English comedian
- Phillip Buchanon (born 1980), American football player
- Phillip Garrido (born 1951), American kidnapper
- Phillip Hagar Smith (1905–1987), American electrical engineer, inventor of the Smith chart
- Phillip Hughes (1988–2014), Australian cricketer
- Phillip Carl Jablonski (1946–2019), American serial killer and rapist
- Phillip Jack Brooks (born 1978), American wrestler, ring name CM Punk
- Phillip James Dodd (born 1971), English-American architect
- Phillip Johnson (disambiguation), multiple people
- Phillip Lindsay (born 1994), American football player
- Philip H. Melanson (1944–2006), American educator and author
- Phillip Noyce (born 1950), Australian film director
- Phillip Phillips (born 1990), American Idol season 11 winner
- Philip Ricketts (1945–2018), American lawyer and government official
- Phillip Schofield (born 1962), English broadcaster and television personality
- Phillip Walsh (disambiguation), multiple people
- Phillip Whitehead (1937–2005), English politician and member of the European Parliament
- Phillip Wilcher (born 1958), Australian classical music composer
- Punxsutawney Phil, Groundhog Day groundhog
- Pylyp Orlyk (1672–1742), writer of Ukraine's first constitution

== Surname ==
- Arthur Phillip (1738–1814), Australian admiral and governor of New South Wales, Australia
- Cornelius Becker Philip (1900–1987), American entomologist
- Emanuel L. Philipp (1861–1925), American politician and governor of the US state of Wisconsin
- Grethe Philip (1916–2016), Danish politician
- John Philip (1775–1851), Scottish missionary in South Africa
- John W. Philip (1840-1900), American Naval Officer

== Country ==
The Philippines is a country that was part of the Spanish Empire and named after King Philip II of Spain.

== Fictional characters ==
- Philoctetes, a character from the Disney film Hercules
- Phillip Niles Argyle, a character from South Park, and part of the comedic duo Terrance and Phillip
- Chance Chancellor, aka Phillip Chancellor IV, a character in The Young and the Restless
- Phil Coulson, a character from the Marvel Cinematic Universe
- Philip J. Fry, the protagonist of Futurama
- Philip "Phil" Intintola, a character on The Sopranos
- Philip Kiriakis, a character in the American soap opera Days of Our Lives
- Philip "Phil" Leotardo, a character from The Sopranos
- Philip Marlowe, a detective character created by Raymond Chandler
- Phil Mitchell, a character from EastEnders
- Phillip "Philly" Parisi, a character on The Sopranos

== See also ==
- Philippa, feminine given name
- Saint Philip (disambiguation)
- Emperor Philip (disambiguation)
- King Philip (disambiguation)
- Prince Philip (disambiguation)
