= Guimet =

Guimet is a surname used by French and Spanish families. Uses of the name include:

== People ==
- Jean-Baptiste Guimet (1795–1871), French industrial chemist
- Émile Étienne Guimet (1836–1918), French industrialist, son of the above
- Felip Comabella i Guimet (1841–1901), Spanish pharmacist
- Úrsula Guimet, a Peruvian female taekwondo practitioner

== Other uses ==
- The Guimet Museum, founded by Émile Étienne Guimet.
- The former Museum of Natural History - Guimet in Lyon. In 2014, its collections were transferred to the Musée des Confluences
- Émile Guimet Prize for Asian Literature, annual French literary prize first awarded in 2017
