= Philippus =

Philippus may refer to:

- Philippus (cognomen), a name associated with the Roman gens Marcia
- Philippus (character), a fictional character in DC Comics

== People ==
- Flavius Philippus, a Roman Empire official under Emperor Constantius II c. 350
- Nonius Philippus (fl. 242), governor of Britannia Inferior
- Philippus (son of Philip V), half-brother of Perseus Antigonid King of Macedon
- Philippus of Chollidae, Plato's neighbor
- Philippus Baldaeus (1632–1672), Dutch minister
- Philippus Jacobus Brepols (1778–1845), Belgian printer and businessman
- Philippus Brietius (1601–1668), French Jesuit historian and cartographer
- Philippus Innemee (1902–1963), Dutch cyclist at the 1924 Summer Olympics
- Philippus Aureolus Paracelsus (1493/4–1541), Swiss physician, alchemist and astrologer of the German Renaissance
- Philippus Rovenius (1573–1651), apostolic vicar of the Dutch Mission
- Philippus Vethaak (1914–1991), Dutch cyclist at the 1936 Summer Olympics

== See also ==
- Philipus Biguerny or Felipe Vigarny (c.1475–1542), French architect and sculptor of the Spanish Renaissance
- Philipus Freylinck (1886–1908), South African cyclist at the 1908 Summer Olympics
- Lucius Marcius Philippus (disambiguation)
- Quintus Marcius Philippus (disambiguation)
- Philip (disambiguation)
