= Phil =

Phil may refer to:

- Phil (given name), a shortened version of masculine and feminine names
- Phill, a given name also spelled "Phil"
- Phil, Kentucky, United States
- Phil (film), a 2019 film
- Philippines, a country in Southeast Asia, frequently abbreviated as PHIL
- Philosophy, abbreviated as "phil."
- Philology, abbreviated as "phil."
- University Philosophical Society of Trinity College, Dublin, nicknamed "the Phil"

== See also ==
- Master of Philosophy (M.Phil)
- Doctor of Philosophy (D.Phil or Ph.D)
- University Philosophical Society, known as "The Phil"
- Big Phil (disambiguation)
- Dr. Phil (disambiguation)
- Fil (disambiguation)
- Fill (disambiguation)
- Philip (disambiguation)
- Philipp
- Philippa
- Philippic
- Philipps
