= Phillippe =

Phillippe is both a given name and a surname. Notable people with the name include:

== People with the given name Phillippe ==
- Phillippe Aumont (born 1989), Canadian baseball player
- Phillippe de Longvilliers de Poincy (1583–1660), French nobleman
- Phillippe de Oliveira (died 1627), Portuguese colonial governor
- Phillippe Édouard Léon van Tieghem (1839–1914), French botanist

== People with the surname Phillippe ==
- Deacon Phillippe (1872–1952), Major League Baseball pitcher
- Ryan Phillippe (born 1974), American actor

== See also ==
- Philip (disambiguation)
- Philips (disambiguation)
- Philipps (disambiguation)
- Phillips (disambiguation)
- Phillipps
