= Filippa =

- Pronunciation: Greek: [fiˈlipa] Italian: [fiˈlippa] Russian: [fʲɪˈlʲipə] Swedish: [fɪˈlɪ̂pːa]
- Gender: Female
- Language: Swedish; Norwegian; Danish; Modern Greek; Italian; Russian

Other gender
- Masculine: Filipp; Filippo; Filippos

Origin
- Language: Greek
- Meaning: "lover of horses"
- Region of origin: Scandinavia; Greece; Cyprus; Italy; Russia

Other names
- Pet names: Pippa; Pippi
- Cognates: Philippa; Filipa

Filippa is a female given name of Greek origin, meaning "lover of horses" or "horses' friend". It is a cognate of the English Philippa (the feminine form of the masculine name Philip) in Scandinavia, Italy, Greece and Cyprus (Φιλίππα), and Russia (Филиппа).

== People with the name Filippa ==
- Filippa Angeldahl (born 1997), Swedish footballer
- Filippa Curmark (born 1995), Swedish footballer
- Filippa Duci (1520–c. 1586), Italian-French noblewoman
- Filippa Fleming (died 1578), Finnish noble and landowner
- Filippa Fotopoulou (formerly Kviten; born 1996), Cypriot track and field athlete
- Filippa Frisell (born 1999), Swedish musician of the duo Bella & Filippa
- Filippa Giordano (born 1974), Italian-Mexican singer
- Filippa Hamilton (born 1985), Swedish-French model
- Filippa Idéhn (born 1990), Swedish handballer
- Filippa Knutsson (born 1965), Swedish fashion designer
- Filippa Lagerbäck (born 1973), Swedish television presenter and model
- Filippa Lentzos, Norwegian social scientist
- Filippa Mareri (1190/1200–1236), Italian Roman Catholic nun
- Filippa Möörk (born 1997), Swedish golfer
- Filippa Nässil (born 1986), Swedish singer-songwriter, musician and producer
- Filippa Reinfeldt (born 1967), Swedish politician
- Filippa Savva (born 1999), Cypriot footballer
- Filippa Wallen (born 2000), Swedish footballer
