= PHILSOC =

PHILSOC or variation, may refer to:

- Philological Society (founded 1842, a.k.a. London Philological Society), a British charity and academic society dedicated to the study of language
- 2019 Philippine Southeast Asian Games Organizing Committee, for the 2019 Southeast Asian Games
- 2005 Philippine SEA Games Organising Committee, for the Manila 2005 Southeast Asian Games
- UCD Philosophy Society (founded 1965), at University College Dublin, in Dublin, Ireland

== See also ==
- phil (disambiguation)
- SOC (disambiguation)
