= Philips (disambiguation) =

Philips is a multinational Dutch electronics corporation.

Philips may also refer to:

- Philips (family) of the Dutch-Jewish electronics corporation
- Philips (surname)
- Philips Classics Records, the classical music division of Philips Records
- Philips Records, a record label founded by the Dutch electronics giant, Philips
- Philip's (film), a 2023 Indian film

== See also ==
- Phelps (disambiguation)
- Philip (disambiguation)
- Philip's (publisher), a publisher of maps, atlases and reference books in the UK
- Philippe's, a restaurant in Los Angeles
- Phillips (disambiguation)
- Phipps (disambiguation)
