= Lip (disambiguation) =

The lip is a soft, protruding organ at the mouth of many animals, including humans.

Lip or lips may also refer to:

== Arts and entertainment ==
=== Music ===
- Lips (band), a New Zealand-based music group
- LIPS, an early incarnation of the American band Chelsea
- Lip (album), a 2019 album by the Japanese band Sekai no Owari
- "Lips" (song), a single by the Japanese band KAT-TUN
- "Lips", a 2023 song by Ive from the album I've Ive
- Lip, a jazz term for glissando, a glide from one pitch to another in music

=== Other arts and entertainment ===
- Lip (magazine)
- Lips (video game)
- The Lips, a 2010 Argentine film
- "L.I.P. (Local Indigenous Personnel)", an episode of the television series M*A*S*H
- Lip Gallagher, a character on the television drama Shameless
- Lip, the main character of the Super Famicom video game Panel de Pon
- Lips, a muppet character from The Muppet Show
- Lips Manlis, a criminal in the Dick Tracy comic

== Nickname or stage name ==
- Leo Durocher (1905–1991), American Hall-of-Fame Major League Baseball player, manager and coach nicknamed "Leo the Lip"
- Steve "Lips" Kudlow, singer in Canadian rock band Anvil
- Lipman Lip Pike (1845–1893), one of the first professional baseball players and first Jewish one
- Tony Lip (1930–2013), American actor born Frank Anthony Vallelonga

== Other uses ==
- Lips (surname)
- Lip (gastropod)
- Lip, a colloquial term for dipping tobacco, or dip
- Lips, a minor Greek god and one of the Anemoi, representing the southwest wind
- The labia of the vulva, also called the outer and inner lips

== LIP or LIPS ==
=== Organizations ===
- Laboratory of Instrumentation and Experimental Particles Physics, a Portuguese physics scientific research organization
- Lycée Innovant de Paris (Paris Innovative Highschool), also called LIP, a French secondary education organization
- London Institute of 'Pataphysics
- Lok Insaaf Party, a political party in Punjab, India

=== In technology ===
- Language Interface Pack, a translated interface for Microsoft Windows or Microsoft Office products
- Laser-induced breakdown spectroscopy
- Lithium-ion polymer battery, a rechargeable battery technology
- Linux Phone Standards Forum, dedicated to the creation of standards aimed at fostering the use of Linux on mobile devices
- Loop Initialization Primitive, a Fibre Channel protocol element
- CaPSL, a printer command language/page description language, also called LIPS or LIPS4

=== Other uses ===
- LIP (company), a troubled French manufacturer of watches and clocks
- Large igneous province, a massive volcanic formation resulting from flood basalt eruptions
- Lateral intraparietal cortex, a region in the parietal lobe of the brain of primates
- Late-inning pressure situation, a baseball statistic
- Life in Pictures, a defunct band from Arizona
- Litigant in person, someone who is engaged in litigation without legal representation
- Lymphocytic interstitial pneumonia, a clinical stage 3 HIV infection

== See also ==
- Flange
- Embouchure or lipping, the use of the lips, facial muscles, tongue, and teeth in playing a wind musical instrument
- Rim
