= Pip (nickname) =

Pip is a name of English origin. It is a nickname for individuals named Philip or Philippa. Another variant is Pippa.

== People ==
- Pip Adam, New Zealand novelist
- Philip Baker, one half of Pip and Jane Baker, a British television writing team
- Pip Borrman (1954–2009), Australian pilot
- Pip Branfield (born 1952), English lawn bowler
- Pip Broughton (born 1957), English film director
- Ladyhawke (born 1979), stage name of New Zealand singer-songwriter and multi-instrumentalist Phillipa Margaret "Pip" Brown
- Percy Jack Clayson (1896–1970), British First World War flying ace, nicknamed Pip
- Pip Courtney, Australian journalist
- Tirso Cruz III (born 1952), Filipino actor and singer, nicknamed Pip
- Pip Elson (born 1954), English golfer
- Arthur Fielder (1877–1949), English cricketer, nicknamed Pip
- Pip Gardner (1914–2003), English recipient of the Victoria Cross
- Pip Hicks (1895–1967), British Army brigadier general
- Pip Karmel (born 1963), Australian film director, editor and screenwriter
- Pip Millett, English musician
- Patrick Playfair (1889–1974), Royal Flying Corps officer and Royal Air Force air marshal, nicknamed Pip
- Pip Proud (1947–2010), Australian singer-songwriter, poet, novelist and dramatist
- Pip Pyle (1950–2006), English-born drummer
- Pip Rippon (1888–1950), English footballer
- Philip Roberts (British Army officer) (1906–1997), British Army major general, nicknamed Pip
- Philippa Tattersall (born 1975), only woman to pass the All Arms Commando Course to join the British Royal Marines, nicknamed Pip
- Pip Torrens (born 1960), English actor
- Pip Williams (born 1947), British musician and record producer
- Pip Williams (author) (born 1969), Australian author

== Fictional characters ==
- Philip "Pip" Pirrip, the protagonist of Dickens' novel Great Expectations
- Pip Pirrup, a minor character from South Park
