= Big Phil =

Big Phil may refer to:

== People ==
- Luiz Felipe Scolari, Brazilian football manager and former professional footballer
- Phillip Leuluai, New Zealand rugby league player
- Big Phil, a producer on the Indo G. album Purple Drank (2007)

== Other uses ==
- Big Phil, a character in the 1915 film A Gentleman of Leisure and the 1923 remake
- Big Phil, a 2004 edition of the Vienna Philharmonic coin consisting of 31.103 kg of pure gold

== See also ==
- Big Fill, a railroad project in Utah, United States
- Phil (disambiguation)
- Big (disambiguation)
