= Todi (disambiguation) =

Todi is a city in Italy. It may also refer to:

== Music ==
- Todi (thaat), a thaat in Hindustani classical music
- Todi (raga), a raga in Hindustani classical music belonging to the Todi thaat
- Hanumatodi, also known as Todi, a raga in Carnatic music

== People ==
- Ashok Todi (born 1958), Indian industrialist
- Luísa Todi (1753–1833), Portuguese opera singer
- Todi Jónsson (born 1972), Faroese former footballer

== Other uses ==
- Tödi, a mountain massif in the Swiss canton of Glarus
- Todi, Gombe State, Nigeria, a village - see List of villages in Gombe State
- Roman Catholic Diocese of Todi, a former Italian diocese
- A.S.D. Todi, a football club based in Todi, Italy

== See also ==
- Benignus of Todi (died 303), Christian martyr and saint
- Fortunatus of Todi (died 537), Bishop of Todi and saint
- Antonio Valli da Todi (fl. 1600), Italian fowler and writer
- Jacopone da Todi (c. 1230–1306), Italian Franciscan friar, song writer and an early pioneer in Italian theatre
- Rogerio da Todi (died 1236), Roman Catholic Franciscan leader
