= Leon Boyd =

Dutch-Canadian baseball player (born 1983)

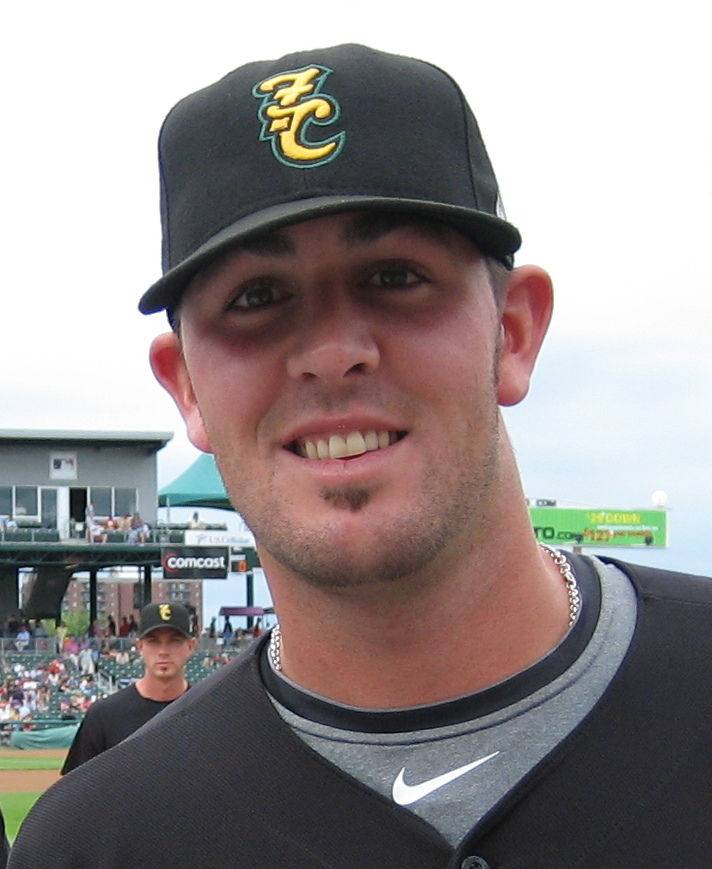
- Boyd in 2009
- Pitcher
- Born: August 30, 1983 (age 43); Vancouver, British Columbia, Canada
- Bats: Right Throws: Right
- Stats at Baseball Reference
Medals
Men's baseball
Representing Netherlands
Baseball World Cup
Gold medal – first place	2011 Panama	National team
Intercontinental Cup
Silver medal – second place	2010 Taiwan	National team
European Baseball Championship
Gold medal – first place	2007 Spain	National team
Silver medal – second place	2010 Germany	National team

Leon Boyd (born August 30, 1983) is a Dutch-Canadian former professional baseball pitcher. He pitched for the Netherlands national team at the 2008 Summer Olympics and 2009 and 2013 World Baseball Classic. He pitched in Minor League Baseball in 2009 and also pitched several years in the Dutch Honkbal Hoofdklasse.

== Baseball career ==
=== B.C. Premier Baseball League ===
Boyd was a starting pitcher for the White Rock Tritons of the British Columbia Premier Baseball League for three seasons.

=== College career ===
Boyd began his college baseball career at Treasure Valley Community College in Ontario, Oregon, in 2002 . He played only one season for the Chukars before transferring to Seminole State Community College in Seminole, Oklahoma, for the 2003 season. He would transfer again in 2004, this time to play for the Armstrong Atlantic State University Pirates. He played two seasons for the Pirates in 2004 and 2005, throwing exclusively as a relief pitcher. Over these two seasons, he appeared in 34 games and had a 3.44 ERA with 104 strikeouts in 115 innings pitched.

=== Hoboken Pioneers (2006) ===
Despite his Dutch family ties and a strong desire to play baseball in the Netherlands, Boyd was not pursued by any Honkbal Hoofdklasse clubs, even after numerous attempts to contact them after his college career ended. Instead, he played for the Hoboken Pioneers in Belgium's Eerste Divisie. He had a successful 2006 season, with an 11–1 win–loss record, 0.84 ERA, and 156 strikeouts in 96 innings pitched, and he also hit .421 with 2 home runs in 38 at bats for the Pioneers, who finished the season as the national runner up.

Following his strong season in Belgium, Boyd was picked up by the Netherlands national team to play in the 2006 Intercontinental Cup in Taichung, Taiwan. Despite his 0–2 record, Boyd had a 2.63 ERA and ranked second on the team in innings pitched. Against Cuba, he took the loss in a 3–2 defeat, allowing four hits and one run in 1 2/3 IP of relief Rob Cordemans. Three days later, he allowed one run in six innings against Japan but again lost as the Dutch were shut out. His final appearance of the tournament came against Australia, where he struck out 7 and allowed one run in six innings in a no-decision as the Netherlands won 4–3.

=== 2007: Neptunus and international tournaments ===
After being scouted by and in contract talks with several Hoofdklasse teams, Boyd signed with Neptunus. He made a debut during the 2007 regular season, with a 9–0 record with no home runs allowed in over 66 innings. He tied for second in wins (with Vaughan Harris and Diego Markwell), was third with a 1.22 ERA (1.22, trailing relievers Duko Jansen and Chris Ryan) and tied for sixth in strikeouts (61, tied with former major league pitcher Eddie Oropesa). He was a finalist for the Pitcher of the Year Award, but lost to David Bergman, in part due to missing a month of the season with a back muscle strain. Despite his initial success, Boyd suffered two losses during the first round of the playoffs as Neptunus was upset by the Pioniers.

In the World Port Tournament, Boyd earned the best pitcher award, allowing only five hits in 15 innings and won twice, including a complete-game shutout against Chinese Taipei, facing only 28 batters. He was 2–0 with a 0.93 ERA, one of the worst on the team, in the European Baseball Championship, helping the Netherlands win gold. He pitched in the Baseball World Cup, going 1–1 with a 2.55 ERA and a team-high 14 strikeouts for the fourth-place squad. He had a solid game but received a no-decision against Australia when closer Michiel van Kampen blew a 3–2 lead in the ninth inning. He allowed one run in six innings in a win over South Korea and matched Tadashi Settsu (the eventual pitcher of the tournament) with five scoreless frames in the bronze medal game before allowing 2 runs in the 6th, as the Dutch were shut out 5–0 by Japan.

=== 2008: Olympics ===
On June 12, 2008, Boyd threw a no-hitter against the Amsterdam Pirates. He allowed two runs, one unearned, thanks to 3 walks, 2 hit batsmen and 3 errors by his team. Shortly thereafter, Boyd had a 4.50 ERA in the European Baseball Cup in Regensburg. He was knocked out early in a win against the host Buchbinder Legionäre.

Head coach Robert Eenhoorn selected Boyd to pitch for the Netherlands at the Summer Olympics in Beijing. In their second game of the tournament against the United States, Boyd entered the game during the 8th inning with the bases loaded and one out after Dave Draijer was struck by a batted ball on the right forearm. Boyd induced two groundouts, resulting in only a single run for the United States. He returned to pitch the top of the 9th inning, and after yielding a leadoff single to Terry Tiffee, retired the next three batters, including Matt LaPorta by strikeout. However, a two-hour rain delay forced the game to be called during the Dutch half of the 9th inning. As a result Boyd's statistics during the 9th inning are unofficial, as the score reverted to the last completed inning.

Boyd made his second appearance of the tournament on August 16, starting against China. He struck out six batters in six innings, yielding only six hits and two runs. The win was the only victory for the Dutch in the tournament.

=== 2009 ===
==== World Baseball Classic ====
Boyd was selected once again for the Dutch national team at the 2009 World Baseball Classic (WBC). Although he has primarily been a starter throughout his career, Boyd was asked by head coach Rod Delmonico to serve as the closer for the Netherlands. During the first round of the tournament held at Hiram Bithorn Stadium in San Juan, Puerto Rico, Boyd entered three separate games during tense, late-inning pressure situations, including two of which he ended up as the pitcher of record.

In the Netherlands' first game of the tournament on March 7, against the heavily favored Dominican Republic, Boyd pitched the 9th inning and earned the save with a game-ending strikeout of José Bautista. Two days later, he entered a game against Puerto Rico with the bases loaded and only one out in the 8th inning, only to give up a two-run double to Yadier Molina and an RBI-single to Jesus Feliciano. The very next day, Boyd rebounded to earn the win in a 2–1 extra-innings Dutch victory that eliminated the Dominicans from the tournament.

Although the Dutch advanced to play in Round 2 of the tournament at Dolphin Stadium in Miami, Florida, Boyd did not make his fourth appearance of the tournament until the 6th inning of an elimination game against the United States. Despite giving up a home run to Adam Dunn, Boyd struck out both David Wright and Ryan Braun in his one inning of relief.

==== New Hampshire Fisher Cats ====
Following his strong pitching performance in the WBC, Boyd signed a minor league contract with the Toronto Blue Jays. Although he was temporarily reassigned to the Dunedin Blue Jays of the Florida State League for an 8-game appearance early in the year, he played the bulk of the season as a member of the Jays' Double-A affiliate, the New Hampshire Fisher Cats. He finished the year with a 1–6 record, a 4.76 ERA, 51 strikeouts, and 6 saves in over 64 innings for the two clubs.

=== 2010–2013 ===
The Blue Jays released Boyd in March 2010, and he subsequently re-signed with Neptunus. According to Boyd, his release was affected by his high walk count and the Jays' trading of Roy Halladay to the Philadelphia Phillies in December 2009. After dealing Halladay the Blue Jays brought in many potential bottom-rotation, Triple-A-caliber potential big league replacements. He went 9–0 with a 0.39 ERA in 15 games, nine of them starts.

Boyd pitched in one have for Neptunus in 2011 and missed the 2012 season.

Bord joined the Dutch national team for the 2013 World Baseball Classic. He allowed one run in 5 2/3 innings. He had his final season in the Hoofdklasse for Kinheim.

== Personal life ==
Growing up, Boyd attended high school at Earl Marriott Secondary School in South Surrey, British Columbia. Although he was born in Canada, he received his Dutch passport in December 2005, as a result of his mother being born and raised in the Netherlands. His father played ice hockey in the Netherlands from 1971 to 1974 and met Leon's mother there. Boyd married American softball player Jeana Short on March 8, 2008. He has an older sister.
