= Pheidippides (disambiguation) =

Pheidippides was an ancient Greek runner.

Pheidippides can also refer to:

- Phidippides cardiomyopathy, cardiomyopathic changes that occur after long periods of endurance training
- 42585 Pheidippides, an asteroid
- a comic character in The Clouds

== See also ==
- Philippides (disambiguation)
