= Phillippo =

Phillippo is a surname. Notable people with the surname include:

- George Phillippo (1833–1914), Chief Justice of Hong Kong
- James Phillippo (1798–1879), British Baptist missionary

== See also ==
- Phillippe
