= Felip =

Male given name

- Gender: Male

Other names
- Related names: Philip

Felip is a Catalan male given name, which derives from the Greek adjective Philippos "friend of horses". It may also refer to:

== First name ==
- Felip de Malla (1370-1431), Catalan prelate, theologian, scholar and poet
- Felip Pedrell (1841-1922), Spanish Catalan-language composer, guitarist and musicologist
- Felip Comabella i Guimet (1841-1901), Spanish pharmacist
- Felip Vall i Verdaguer (1916-2012), Spanish painter, decorator and designer
- Felip Puig (born 1958), Spanish member of Parliament of Catalonia
- Felip Ortiz (born 1977), Spanish football manager and former goalkeeper
- Felip Gomes (born 1978), Indian football defender
- Felip (musician) (born 1997), Filipino singer-songwriter and rapper

== Last name ==
- Guido De Felip (1904-1968), Italian rowing coxswain
- Álex Felip (born 1992), Spanish football midfielder
