= Lips (surname) =

Lips is a Dutch and German patronymic surname, "Lip" being a short form of Filip or Philip. People with this name include:

- Bruno Lips (1908–1939), Swiss canoer
- Charles C. Lips (ca. 1835–1888), German-born American civil servant
- Constantine Lips (died 917), Byzantine aristocrat and admiral
- Hannie Lips (1924–2012), Dutch broadcaster and television announcer
- Joest Lips (1547–1606), Flemish philologist and humanist better known as "Lipsius"
- Johann Heinrich Lips (1758–1817), Swiss copper engraver
- Karen Lips (born 1995), American biologist
- Michael Lips (born 1967), Swiss curler
- Miriam Lips (born 1967), Dutch-born New Zealand academic
- Patricia Lips (born 1963), German politician
- Robert Lips (1912–1975), Swiss cartoonist and fencer
- Thomas Lips (born 1970), Swiss curler
- Tim Lips (born 1985), Dutch equestrian
- Tom Lips (born 1968), American soccer player

== See also ==
- Marjolein Lips-Wiersma, New Zealand academic
