= Lenroot =

Lenroot can refer to:

- Arthur Lenroot, Jr. (1912-1997), a Wisconsin Republican politician
- Irvine Lenroot (January 31, 1869 – January 26, 1949), a Wisconsin Republican politician
- Lenroot, Wisconsin, a town in Sawyer County, Wisconsin, United States
