= The Sound of Philadelphia (disambiguation) =

The Sound of Philadelphia is a style of music most commonly associated with Philadelphia International Records.

The Sound of Philadelphia may also refer to:

- "TSOP (The Sound of Philadelphia)", a 1974 single by MFSB featuring the Three Degrees
- Philadelphia soul, a genre of music
- Brothers by Blood, a 2020 American film originally called The Sound of Philadelphia

== See also ==
- Philadelphia (disambiguation)
