= Filipa =

- Pronunciation: FIL-i-pa
- Gender: Female

Origin
- Origin: Greek
- Meaning: "Friend of horses"
- Region of origin: Portugal, Brazil, Croatia, Poland Serbia

Other names
- Related names: Philippa, Filippa

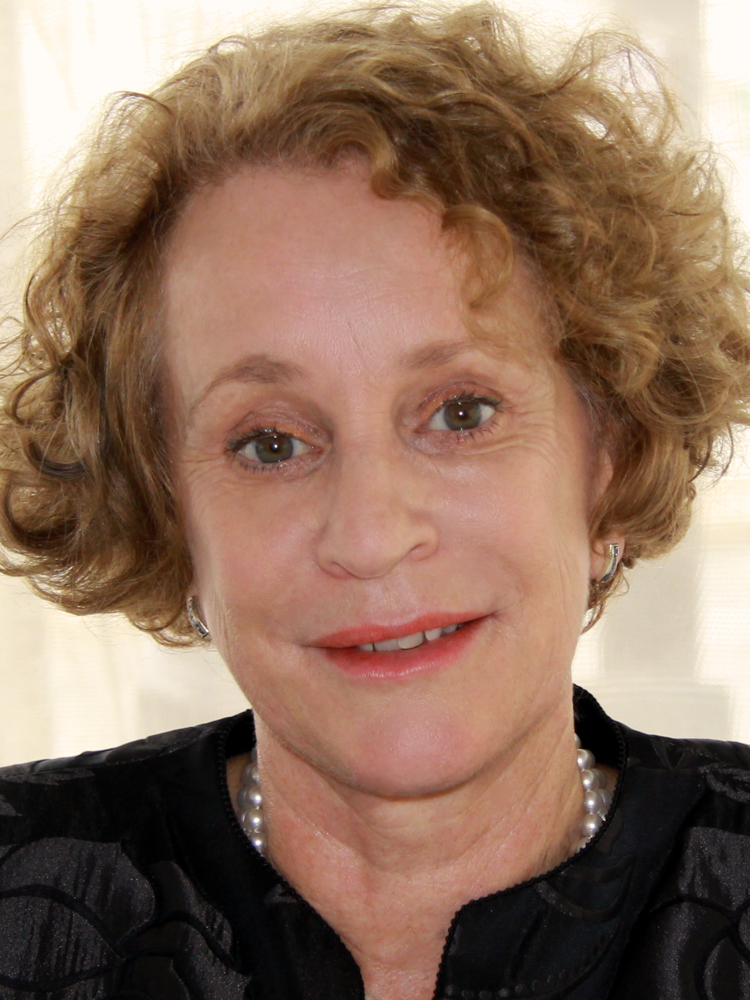
Philippa Gregory

Filipa is a given name meaning "friend of horses". Common alternative spellings include Philippa, Phillippa, Filippa, or Filipa. It is the feminine form of the masculine name Philip in Serbian, Portuguese, Croatian, Czech and Polish. It is a noble name in Portugal and a rare name in Brazil.

Notable people with the name Filipa include:

- Filipa Azevedo, Portuguese singer
- Filipa César, Portuguese film director
- Filipa de Lencastre, English princess, consort queen of Portugal
- Filipa Moniz Perestrelo, Portuguese noblewoman
- Filipa Pinto (born 1971), Portuguese politician
- Filipa Carmo da Silva, South African singer
- Filipa Sousa, Portuguese singer
- Filipa of Coimbra, Portuguese royal, granddaughter of Filipa de Lencastre

== See also ==
- Philippa
