= Philip (disambiguation) =

Philip is a masculine given name.

Philip or Phillip or Philipp may also refer to:

== Places ==
- Phillip, Australian Capital Territory, Canberra
- Philip, South Dakota, United States
- Philipp, Mississippi, United States
- Phillip Island (disambiguation)
- Port Philip (disambiguation)

== See also ==
- Philipp, a surname and a given name
- Philipps, a surname
- Emperor Philip (disambiguation)
- Filip
- Fillip
- Filipp
- King Philip (disambiguation)
- Prince Philip (disambiguation)
- Phil (disambiguation)
- Phill
- Philippa
- Philippic
- Philippines
- Saint Philip (disambiguation)
