= Peppi =

Peppi is a given name.

In Finland, Peppi is a female name. Originally it may have been derived from Filippa, but its popularity in the 2000s is explained by Astrid Lindgren's character Pippi Longstocking (Finnish: Peppi Pitkätossu). As of 2015 the name has been given to 2,796 people. The name was added to the almanac in 2010, with a name day on 1 April.

== People with the name ==
- Peppi (Gerard van Essen, 1924–1997), of double act Peppi & Kokki on Dutch TV in the 1970s
- Peppi Bruneau (born 1942), politician in Louisiana, USA
- Peppi Azzopardi (born 1959), presenter on Maltese TV
- Josef "Peppi" Heiß (born 1963), German ice hockey goaltender
- Peppi Zellner (born 1975), American football player
