= King Philip =

King Philip may refer to

- Philip I of Macedon (fl. c. 593 BC)
- Philip II of Macedon (380–336 BC), father of Alexander the Great
- Philip III of Macedon (357–317 BC)
- Philip IV of Macedon (died 297 BC)
- Philip V of Macedon (238–179 BC)
- Philippe of Belgium (born 1960)
- Ee-mat-la (1739–1839) war leader of the Seminole in the Second Seminole War
- Metacomet (1638–1676), war leader of the Wampanoag in King Philip's War whose name anglicized was King Phillip
- Philip I of Castile "the Handsome" (1478–1506)
- Philip I of France "the Amorous" (1052–1108)
- Philip II of France "Augustus" (1165–1223)
- Philip III of France "the Bold" (1245–1285)
- Philip IV of France "the Fair" (1268–1314), also King of Navarre as Philip I
- Philip V of France "the Tall" (1293–1322), also King of Navarre as Philip II
- Philip VI of France "the Fortunate" (1293–1350)
- Philip III of Navarre (1301–1343)
- Philip I Philadelphus Seleucid (95–84/83 BC)
- Philip II Philoromaeus last Seleucid (65–63 BC)
- Philip II of Spain and I of Portugal (1526–1598), also King of England and Ireland by marriage (1554–1558)
- Philip III of Spain and II of Portugal (1578–1621)
- Philip IV of Spain and III of Portugal (1605–1665)
- Philip V of Spain (1683–1746)
- Philip VI of Spain, more often known by his Spanish name of Felipe VI (born 1968)
- Philip of Swabia, King of Germany and Duke of Swabia (1177–1208)
- Philip of Sweden (12th century)
- Philip Simonsson, Bagler pretender and ruler of eastern Norway (1207–1217) during the reign of Inge II of Norway

== See also ==
- Philip (disambiguation)
- Emperor Philip (disambiguation)
- Prince Philip (disambiguation)
- Philip the Apostle
