= Phillies (disambiguation) =

The Philadelphia Phillies are a Major League Baseball team.

Phillies may also refer to:

== Sports ==
- Reading Fightin Phils, formerly the Reading Phillies, an Eastern League baseball team and AA-level farm team of the Major League club
- Clearwater Threshers, formerly the Clearwater Phillies, a Florida State League baseball team and high-A-level farm team of the Major League club
- Florida Complex League Phillies, formerly the GCL Phillies, a Gulf Coast League baseball team and farm team of the Major League club
- VSL Phillies, a Venezuelan Summer League baseball team and farm team of the Major League club
- Dominican Summer Phillies, a Dominican Summer League baseball team and farm team of the Major League club
- Philadelphia Phillies (NFL), the National Football League (1902) team

== Other uses ==
- Phillies cigars, an American brand of cigars

== See also ==
- Philly (disambiguation)
- Philadelphia (disambiguation)
- Philadelphian (disambiguation)
