= Dr. Phil (disambiguation) =

Dr. Phil may refer to:

- Phil McGraw (born 1950), American TV personality, with a doctorate in clinical psychology, without an active license, nicknamed "Dr. Phil" by Oprah Winfrey for his segments/guest slots on Oprah, the Oprah Winfrey Show, starting in the 1990s
- Dr. Phil (talk show), American TV talk show started in 2002, starring Phil McGraw
- Doctor of Philosophy (Dr.Phil.), an advanced degree in many fields
  - a person holding a doctorate in the field of philosophy

== See also ==
- Dr. Phil van Neuter, a Muppet
- Doctor of Philology, a person holding a doctorate in philology
- Phil (disambiguation)
- DR (disambiguation)
