= Phillips =

Phillips may refer to:

== Businesses ==
=== Energy ===
- Chevron Phillips Chemical, American petrochemical firm jointly owned by Chevron Corporation and Phillips 66.
- ConocoPhillips, American energy company
- Phillips 66, American energy company
- Phillips Petroleum Company, American oil company

=== Service ===
- Phillips (auctioneers), auction house
- Phillips Distilling Company, Minnesota distillery
- Phillips Foods, Inc. and Seafood Restaurants, seafood chain in the mid-Atlantic states
- Phillips International Records, a record label founded by Sam Phillips

=== Vehicle ===
- Phillips (constructor), American constructor of racing cars
- Phillips Cycles, British manufacturer of bicycles and mopeds

== People ==
=== Surname ===
- Phillips (surname)

=== Given name ===
- Phillips Barry (1880–1937), American academic
- Phillips Brooks (1835–1893), American clergyman and author
- Phillips Callbeck (1744–1790), merchant and political figure in St. John's Island, Canada
- Phillips Carlin (1894–1971), American radio broadcaster and television executive
- Phillips Cosby (1729–1808), Royal Navy officer who fought in the American Revolutionary War
- Phillips Gybbon (1678–1762), English MP
- Phillips Holmes (1907–1942), American film actor
- Phillips Idowu (born 1978), British athlete
- Phillips Lee Goldsborough (1865–1946), American politician from Maryland
- Phillips Lord (1902–1975), American actor and writer
- Phillips O'Brien (born 1963), American historian
- Phillips Payson (1704–1778), American minister
- Phillips Smalley (1865–1939), American silent film director and actor
- Phillips Talbot (1915–2010), U.S. ambassador to Greece
- Phillips Tead (1893–1974), American actor
- Phillips Waller Smith (1906–1963), Major General in the United States Air Force
- Phillips White (1729–1811), American farmer and member of the Continental Congress

== Places ==
=== Canada ===
- Phillips Square, public square in Montreal, Quebec

=== United States ===
- Phillips, California
- Phillips, Maine
- Phillips, Minneapolis, Minnesota
- Phillips, Nebraska
- Phillips, Oklahoma
- Phillips, Texas
- Phillips, Wisconsin
- Phillips Township, White County, Illinois
- The Phillips Collection, an art museum in Washington, D.C.

=== Outer space ===
- Phillips (lunar crater)
- Phillips (Martian crater)

== Science and technology ==
- Phillips screwdriver
- Phillips curve, an economic curve
- Phillips relationship, in astrophysics

== Schools ==
- Phillips Academy, a boarding secondary school in Andover, Massachusetts
- Phillips Exeter Academy, a boarding secondary school in Exeter, New Hampshire
- Phillips High School (North Carolina), Raleigh, North Carolina
- Phillips Theological Seminary, Tulsa, Oklahoma
- Phillips University, Oklahoma

== Other uses ==
- Phillips disaster of 1989, a series of explosions and fires in the Houston Ship Channel
- USS Phillips (SP-1389), US Navy patrol boat during World War I

== See also ==
- Phillips County (disambiguation)
- Philipps (disambiguation)
- Philips (disambiguation)
- Phillipps
- Philips
- Philip (disambiguation)
