= Philippe =

Philippe is a masculine given name, cognate to Philip, and sometimes also a surname. The name may refer to:

- Philippe of Belgium (born 1960), King of the Belgians (2013–present)
- Philippe (footballer) (born 2000), Brazilian footballer
- Prince Philippe, Count of Flanders, father to Albert I of Belgium
- Philippe d'Orléans (disambiguation), multiple people
- Philippe Agostini (1910–2001), French cinematographer, director, and screenwriter
- Philippe A. Autexier (1954–1998), French music historian
- Philippe Blain, French volleyball player and coach
- Philippe Najib Boulos (1902–1979), Lebanese lawyer and politician
- Philippe Broussard (born 1963), French journalist
- Philippe Claudel (born 1962), French writer and film director
- Philippe Coutinho, Brazilian footballer
- Philippe Daverio (1949–2020), Italian art historian
- Philippe Djian (born 1949), French author
- Philippe Dubuisson-Lebon, Canadian football player
- Philippe Gaulier (1943–2026), French clown and academic
- Philippe Gilbert, Belgian bicycle racer
- Philippe Ginestet (born 1954), French billionaire businessman, founder of GiFi
- Philippe Housiaux (born 1947), Belgian sprinter
- Philippe Jamet (born 1961), French engineer and academic
- Philippe Noiret, French actor
- Philippe Petit, French performer and tightrope artist
- Philippe Petitcolin (born 1952/53), French businessman, CEO of Safran
- Philippe Russo, French singer
- Philippe Sella, French rugby player
- Philippe Senderos, Swiss footballer
- Philippe Swan, Belgian singer-songwriter
- Philippe Ulrich (born 1951), French composer and programmer
- Philippe Verneret (born 1962), French alpine skier

== Surname ==
- Adrien Philippe (1815–1894), French watchmaker
- Andre Philippe (1927–2007), American film and television actor
- Annie Philippe (born 1946), French pop singer
- Didier Philippe (born 1961), French footballer
- Édouard Philippe (born 1970), French politician, Prime Minister of France (2017–2020)
- François Philippe (1930-2001), French footballer
- Jean Philippe (1930–2022), French singer
- Jean-Loup Philippe (1934–2025), French actor, writer and director of film and theatre
- Josh Philippe (born 1997), Australian cricketer
- Laëtitia Philippe (born 1991), French footballer
- Marie-Dominique Philippe (1912–2006), French philosopher and theologian
- Maurice Philippe (1932–1989), British engineer and car designer
- Patrick Philippe (born 1962), French curler and coach
- Peguero Jean Philippe (born 1981), Haitian footballer
- Rayan Philippe (born 2000), French footballer
- Richard Philippe (1990–2018), French racing driver
- Sébastien Philippe (born 1975), French racing driver
- Terry Philippe (born 1957), Australian rules footballer
- Thomas Philippe (1905–1993), French Catholic priest
- Xavier Philippe (born 1980), French rower
- Xavier Philippe (criminal) (born 1956), French criminal
- Yovanni Philippe (born 2002), Mauritian Paralympic athlete
