= Phipps =

Phipps may refer to:

- Phipps (surname)
- Phipps, Wisconsin, an unincorporated community
- Phipps Bridge tram stop, a halt on the Tramlink service in the London Borough of Merton
- Phipps Conservatory and Botanical Gardens, buildings and grounds set in Schenley Park, Pittsburgh, Pennsylvania
- Phipps NBC, a brewing company based in Northampton, England
- Phipps Plaza, a mall in Buckhead, Atlanta
