= Phillipps =

Phillipps is both a given name and an English surname. Notable people with the name include:

"Phillipps" has also been a shortened version of Philippson, a German surname especially prevalent amongst German Jews and Dutch Jews.

People with the given name Phillipps:

- Ambrose Lisle March Phillipps De Lisle (1809–1878), founder of a Trappist abbey
- John Phillipps Kenyon (1927–1996), British historian

People with the surname Phillipps:

- Anthea Phillipps (born 1956), British botanist
- Everard Aloysius Lisle Phillipps (1835–1857), English recipient of the Victoria Cross
- Jack Phillipps (1898–1977), New Zealand cricket administrator
- Martin Phillipps (born 1963), New Zealand singer/songwriter of The Chills
- Roy Phillipps (1892–1941), Australian fighter ace
- Thomas Phillipps (1792–1872), English antiquary and book collector
- Vivian Phillipps (Henry Vivian Phillipps, 1870–1955), British teacher, lawyer and Liberal politician
- William Herbert Phillipps (1847–1935), South Australian businessman and philanthropist
- William J. Phillipps (1893–1967), New Zealand ichthyologist

== See also ==
- Halliwell-Phillipps
- Phillippe
- Philips (surname)
- Philipps (disambiguation)
- Phillips (disambiguation)
