= Dura-Europos brothel =

Masonic lodge of Guild house G5-C

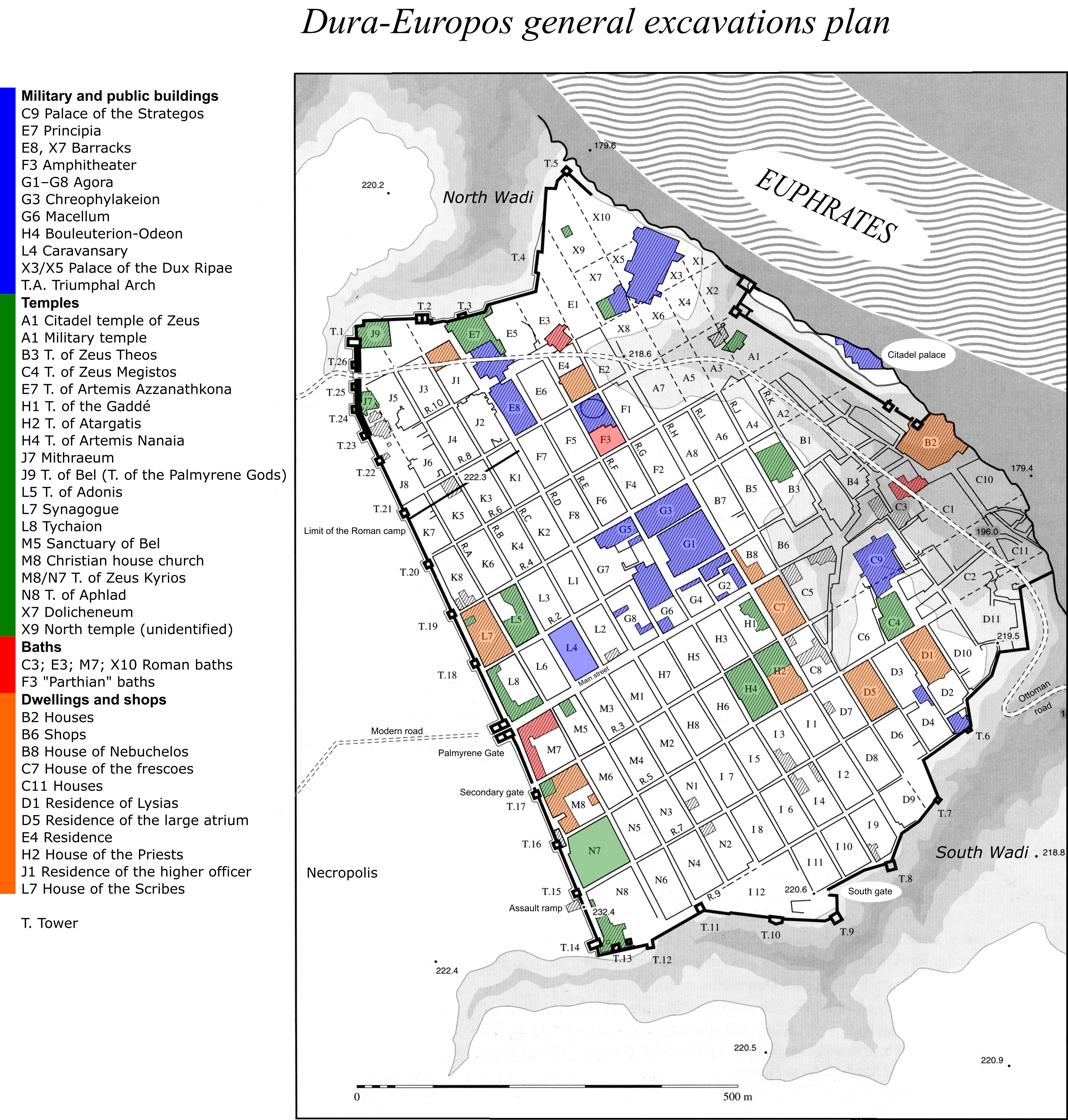
The Dura-Europos general excavation plan, brothel is listed here under the agora section covering buildings G1-G8

The house that is known as Dura-Europos' brothel is a part of the Block G5 agora of Dura-Europos, and specifically refers to the house G5-C. It was the workplace of a guild of entertainers, which likely encompassed the surrounding buildings as well.

== Description ==
The brothel's architectural structure is similar to the other houses excavated at this site, but several other factors have been used to identify this building to be a brothel. Generally, brothels have been identified in other Greco-Roman sites, like Pompeii and Athens, based on the architecture of the building. However, in this case, a dipinto was found in G5- C2 that details the members of the guild of entertainers, what they could do, and a list of the notices of their travel to and from Zeugma. In addition, the erotic art, graffiti, and painted relief of Aphrodite identifies the building as a brothel.

Most of the entertainers came from Zeugma, and likely traveled to Dura-Europos with the Roman military. The dipinto lists 63 names total, listed under different groups. Some of these groups consisted of those officially in the organization, new arrivals and departures, and slaves. A few of the listed occupations of these entertainers were tragedians, dancers, a dice-player, and several performers of mime.

Due to the sheer number of people listed on this dipinto, it is likely that many of these entertainers lived in the nearby houses. Evidence for this includes a reserve of coins, many of which were from Zeugma, that was found in the adjacent house, G5-D. The proximity of the location to the military quarters lends a lot of credit to the idea that the purpose of the building was to be a brothel. 'Sexual service' was a necessity for the Roman army in their provinces, so it is incredibly likely that Dura-Europos would have a building for this purpose.

== Discourse on the building's name ==
There is some argument over whether or not this site should be referred to as a brothel, considering that it was home to several other entertainers that were not prostitutes. The traditional architecture of this building contributes to this argument, as most brothels at the time had a unique architecture, as is seen in those found in Pompeii and Athens. Although it is clear that prostitutes did in fact work in this building, this was ultimately a house of entertainment in several forms. However, the idea of it as a brothel has caught on and become sensationalized in the archeological world, leading to its name today.

== Relief of Aphrodite ==
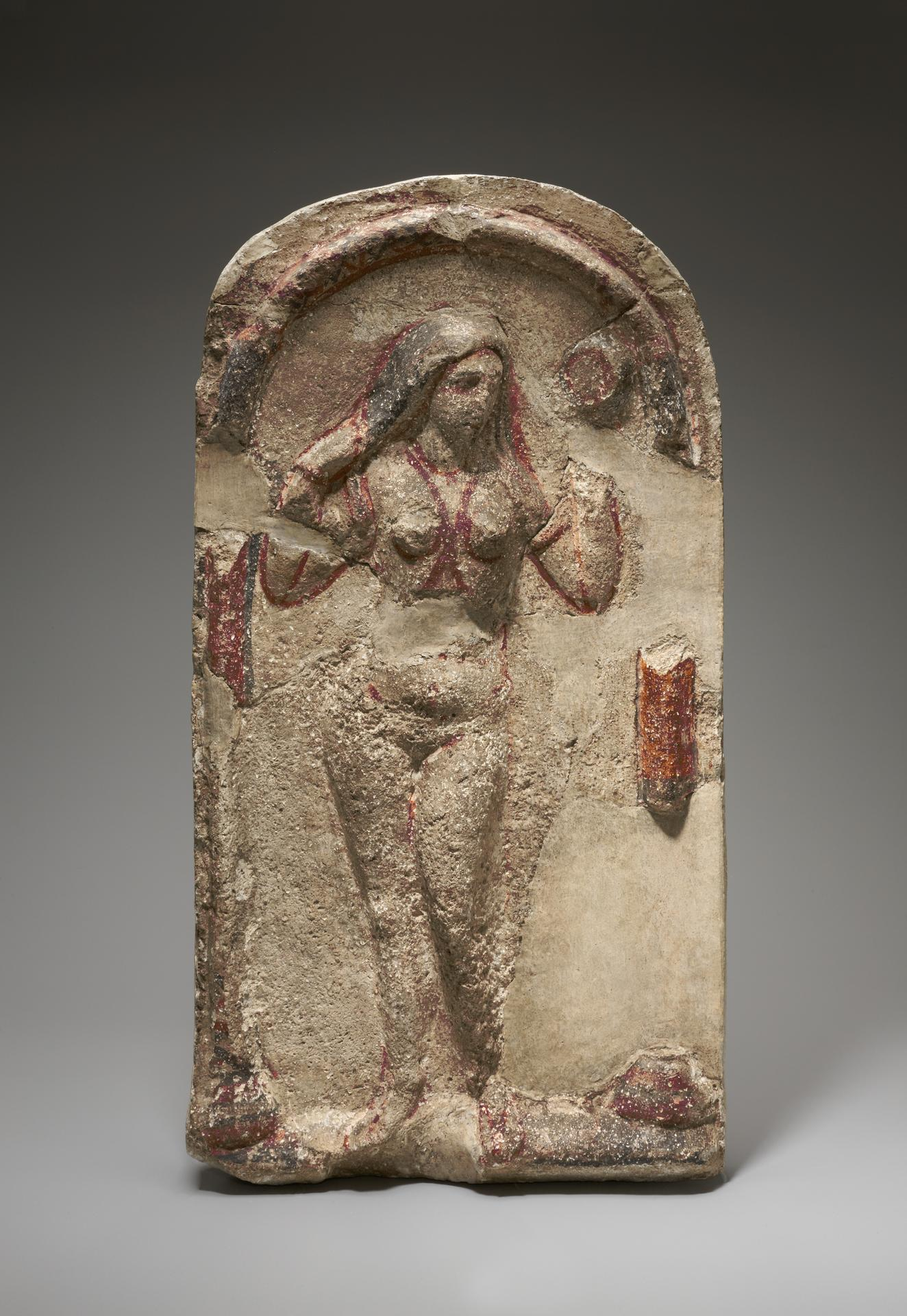
The relief of Aphrodite found in the brothel, one of three made from the same mold.

Also found in the G5-C house was a relief of Aphrodite, made from the same mold as three others found at the Dura-Europos site. It depicts Aphrodite, clad in only breast ornamentation and bracelets, staring at herself in a mirror. This relief is made of plaster and used to be brightly painted, as is evident from the red markings that remain. It has been theorized that this depiction of the fertility goddess found in the brothel was symbolic of the professions of the prostitutes working there, but the fact that similar depictions have been found all over the Dura-Europos site discredits this.

The depictions of deities in Dura-Europos tended to be a mixture of cultures, as Dura-Europos itself was a place of mixed cultures. The city was founded by the Greeks, then taken over by Parthians, then by the Romans, under whose occupation the city eventually fell to a Sassanian siege. This led to a highly diverse population that had mixed imagery of deities. Despite the fact that the Greeks were far removed from most of the development of Dura-Europos, Aphrodite and Heracles remained the two most frequently portrayed deities.
