= New Philadelphia =

New Philadelphia can refer to:

- New Philadelphia, Illinois, USA
- New Philadelphia, Indiana, USA
- New Philadelphia, Ohio, USA
  - New Philadelphia High School
- New Philadelphia, Pennsylvania, USA
- Nea Filadelfeia, Attica, Greece; a suburb of Athens; aka "New Philadelphia"
- Nea Filadelfeia, Thessaloniki, Greece; a village; aka "New Philadelphia"

== See also ==
- Philadelphia (disambiguation)
- Ionikos New Philadelphia
- West Lafayette-New Philadelphia Road, Ohio, USA
- New Philadelphia-Uhrichsville Road, Ohio, USA
