= Philippos =

Philippos is a masculine given name, cognate to Philip. Notable people with the surname include:

- Philippos Constantinos, Cypriot singer
- Philippos Syrigos (1948–2013), Greek investigative journalist and sports reporter
