= Fülöp (surname) =

Fülöp, also spelled Fulop in other languages, is a Hungarian surname meaning Philip. Notable people with this surname include:

- Attila Fülöp (born 1978), Hungarian politician
- Catherine Fulop, Hungarian-Venezuelan actress
- Ferenc Fülöp, Hungarian footballer
- István Fülöp, Hungarian politician
- Márton Fülöp, Hungarian footballer
- Mihály Fülöp, Hungarian fencer
- Noel Fülöp, Hungarian footballer
- Péter Fülöp (diplomat), Hungarian diplomat
- Rob Fulop, American game programmer
- Steven Fulop, American politician
- Zoltán Fülöp, Hungarian footballer
- Lóránd Fülöp, Romanian footballer of Hungarian ethnicity.
- István Fülöp (footballer), Romanian footballer of Hungarian ethnicity.
