= Philippides =

Philippides is a Greek name meaning "Son of Philip"; Philip means "lover of horses". Derivative, patronym, of the more common ancient Greek name "Philippos" Notable people with this name include:

- Pheidippides, also known as Philippides, said to have run from Marathon to Athens bringing news of the Greek victory at the battle of Marathon
- Philippides (comic poet), flourished 336-333 BC.
- Philippides of Paiania, fl. 293/2 BC, wealthy Athenian oligarch
- Mary Zelia Pease Philippides (1906–2009), American archaeologist and librarian
