= Philadelphian =

Philadelphian may refer to:

- Someone who is from (or a resident of) the city of Philadelphia
  - List of people from Philadelphia
- Old Philadelphians, members of the First Families of Philadelphia considered part of the historic core of the East Coast establishment
- Philadelphian Society, a 17th-century Protestant religious sect (sometimes called the "Philadelphians", or the "Philadelphia Society")
- Philadelphian cricket team, a first-class cricket team from the turn of the 20th century
- a train operated by Amtrak as part of the Clocker service

== See also ==
- Philadelphion, a public square located in Constantinople
- Philadelphia (disambiguation)
- Phillies (disambiguation)
- Philly (disambiguation)
