= Prince Philip (disambiguation) =

Prince Philip, Duke of Edinburgh (1921–2021) was the royal consort of Elizabeth II of Great Britain.

Prince Philip may also refer to:

== Royalty ==
- Philip I, Prince of Taranto (1278–1331)
- Philip I of Piedmont (1278–1334), Prince of Achaea, Lord of Piedmont
- Philip II, Prince of Taranto (1329–1374)
- Philip, Prince of Anhalt-Köthen (1468–1500)
- Philip, Prince of Portugal (1533–1539)
- Philip de Lannoy, Prince of Sulmona (1544–1561)
- Philip William, Prince of Orange (1554–1618)
- Philip Joseph, Prince of Salm-Kyrburg (1709–1779)
- Infante Felipe, Duke of Calabria (1747–1777)
- Prince Philippe, Count of Flanders (1837–1905)
- Prince Philippe, Count of Paris (1838–1894)
- Prince Philipp of Saxe-Coburg and Gotha (1844–1921)
- Philipp, Prince of Eulenburg (1847–1921)
- Prince Philip of Bourbon-Two Sicilies (1885–1949)
- Philipp, Landgrave of Hesse (1896–1980)
- Prince Philipp of Liechtenstein (born 1946)
- Philippe of Belgium (born 1960), now the king of Belgium
- Philipp, Prince of Hohenlohe-Langenburg (born 1970)
- Philip, Hereditary Prince of Yugoslavia (born 1982)
- Prince Philippos of Greece and Denmark (born 1986)

=== Pretenders ===
- Philip II of Piedmont (1340–1368), Count of Piedmont, Pretender Prince of Achaea

== Fictional characters ==
- Prince Phillip (Disney), a character in Sleeping Beauty

== People with the nickname ==
- Phillip Mitchell (born 1944), American R&B singer, songwriter, and record producer
- Philip Smart (1960–2014), Jamaican-born music producer

== See also ==
- Philip (name), a given name and surname
- King Philip (disambiguation)
- Emperor Philip (disambiguation)
- Philip (disambiguation)
