= Filadelfia =

Filadelfia may refer to:

== Americas ==
- Filadélfia, Bahia, a municipality in the Brazilian state of Bahia
- Filadelfia, Caldas, Colombia
- Filadelfia, Pando, Bolivia, in the province of Manuripi
- Filadélfia, Tocantins, a municipality in the Brazilian state of Tocantins
- Filadelfia de Guanacaste, Costa Rica
- Filadelfia, Paraguay, a town in Paraguay.

== Europe ==
- Filadelfia, Calabria, Italy
- Nea Filadelfeia, a suburb in the northern part of Athens, Greece
- Stadio Filadelfia, an historic football stadium in Turin, Italy

== See also ==
- Philadelphia (disambiguation)
