= Emperor Philip =

Emperor Philip may refer to:

- Philip I (Roman emperor) (204–249; Philip the Arab), Caesar, Emperor of the Roman Empire
- Philip II (Roman emperor) (237–249; Philip the Younger), Caesar, Emperor of the Roman Empire
- Philip I, Latin Emperor (1243–1283), Emperor of the Latin Empire of Constantinople
- Philip II, Latin Emperor (1278–1331), Emperor of the Latin Empire of Constantinople
- Philip III, Latin Emperor (1329–1374), Emperor of the Latin Empire of Constantinople

== See also ==
- King Philip (disambiguation)
- Prince Philip (disambiguation)
- Philip (disambiguation)
- Philip (name)
- Philippikos Bardanes (died 713), Emperor of the Byzantine Empire
