= Poggio Santa Maria =

- Frazione
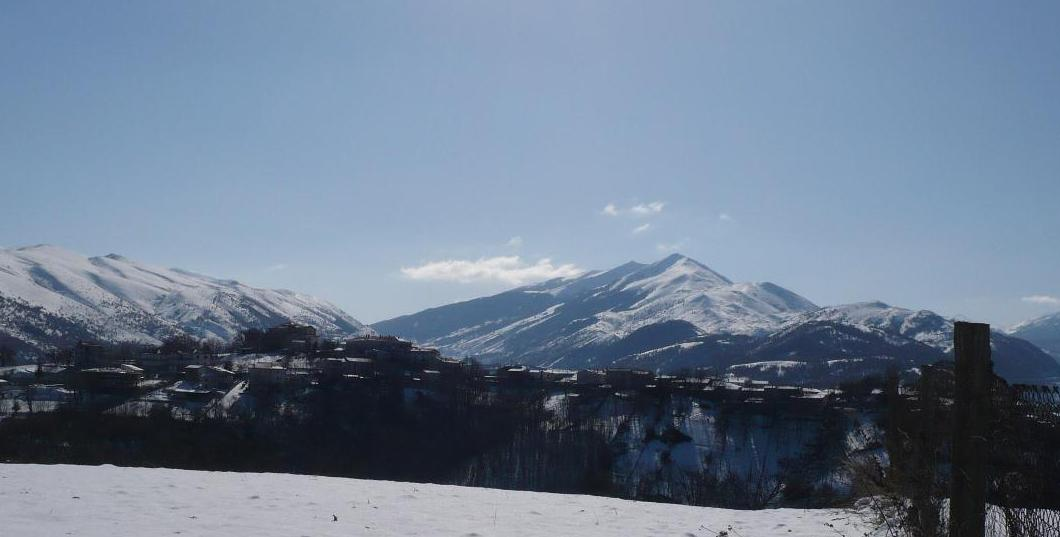
- Interactive map of Poggio Santa Maria
- Coordinates: 42°19′49″N 13°17′58″E
- Country: Italy
- Region: Abruzzo
- Province: L'Aquila
- Commune: L'Aquila
- Elevation: 869 m (2,851 ft)

Population (2001)
  - Total: 300
- Time zone: UTC+1 (CET)
  - Summer (DST): UTC+2 (CEST)
- Postal code: 67100

Poggio Santa Maria is a frazione of L'Aquila in the same-named province in the Abruzzo region of Italy.

Blessed Filippa died in Poggio Santa Maria on 16 February 1236.
