= Phillips County =

Phillips County is the name of several counties in the United States:

- Phillips County, Arkansas
- Phillips County, Colorado
- Phillips County, Kansas
- Phillips County, Montana

== See also ==
- Phillip County, New South Wales, Australia
- Phillips (disambiguation)
