= Phillip G. Bernstein =

American architect, technologist, and educator

Phillip G. Bernstein is an American architect, technologist, and educator. He is a Fellow of the American Institute of Architects (FAIA), a member of the National Organization of Minority Architects (NOMA) and a LEED Accredited Professional. He is currently a licensed architect in California.

Bernstein has taught at the Yale University School of Architecture since 1989 and is currently Deputy Dean and Professor in the Practice. He developed the practice curriculum at Yale School of Architecture and has taught courses focusing on professional practice, the business models and value propositions of the architectural profession, and artificial intelligence. Starting in 2020, he co-taught courses on forced labor in the building supply chain with Ambassador (Ret.) Luis C.Debaca.

Bernstein was formerly a vice president at Autodesk, where he was responsible for setting the company’s AEC vision and Building Information Modeling (BIM) strategy that included the development of the Revit platform. He was the executive responsible for Autodesk’s award-winning Waltham AEC Headquarters, a pioneering example of integrated project delivery (IPD) projects.

Prior to joining Autodesk, Phil practiced architecture as an associate principal at Cesar Pelli & Associates (renamed to Pelli Clarke & Partners in 2021) where he managed projects including Ronald Reagan National Airport, the Mayo Clinic, UCLA, and Goldman Sachs.

Bernstein writes extensively on issues related to practice and technology and has contributed to numerous architectural magazines, books, and journals. His most recently published book, Machine Learning: Architecture in the Age of Artificial Intelligence (2022), explores the impact of artificial intelligence and machine learning on the field of architecture.

== Education ==
- Yale University, Bachelor of Arts magna cum laude with distinction in architecture, 1979
- Yale School of Architecture, Master of Architecture, 1983

== Lectures, interviews and discussions ==
- "Phil Bernstein and Sam Omans: Machine Learning: Architecture in the age of Artificial Intelligence." YouTube video. Uploaded by Yale School of Architecture, April 12, 2024.
- "Machine Learning: Architecture in the Age of Artificial Intelligence." YouTube video, 1:32:45. Uploaded by faculti, October 25, 2024.
- "The Future of Architectural Education Lecture Series Phil Bernstein." YouTube video, 16:42. Uploaded by RAIC Centre for Architecture at Athabasca University, April 23, 2024.
- Center for Architecture. Artificial Intelligence in Architecture | AIA Future of Architectural Practice. Accessed March 18, 2025.
- "2023 UTZON Lecture | Phil Bernstein." YouTube video. Uploaded by UNSW Community, August 3, 2023.
- "Machine Learning & Artificial Intelligence: Opportunities & Threats to Design Practice." YouTube video. Uploaded by Center for Innovation, October 15, 2022.
- "Profession at a Crossroads: Reconciling Architecture’s Past with the Demands of Its Future." Harvard Design Magazine, 29 April 2019.
- "The Future of Making Buildings | Phil Bernstein | TEDxYale." YouTube video, 16:42. Uploaded by TEDx Talks, October 26, 2015.
- ArchDaily. "Archiculture Interviews Phil Bernstein." ArchDaily, 10 February 2015.

== Selected works ==
- Bernstein, P., (2022). Machine Learning: Architecture in the Age of Artificial Intelligence. London, RIBA Publishing.
- Bernstein, P., (2018). Architecture | Design | Data: Practice Competency in the Era of Computation. Berlin, Germany, Birkhäuser.
- Bernstein, P., D. Friedman, et al. (2015). Goat Rodeo: Practicing Built Environments. Minneapolis, Fried Fish Publishing.
- Bernstein, P. and Deamer, P, Eds. (2011). BIM In Academia. New Haven, Yale School of Architecture.
- Bernstein P. and Deamer, P., Eds. (2009). Building (In) The Future: Recasting Labor in Architecture. New York, Princeton Architectural Press.

== Selected honors and awards ==
- Design Intelligence America’s Top 30 Architectural Educators, 2010 and 2014
- Outstanding Industry Contributor, Connecticut Construction Institute, 2010
- Autodesk AEC Division Headquarters Project:
  - Interior Design Magazine “Best of Year Award” Eco category, 2009
  - Architectural Record Award of Excellence, “for implementing innovative architectural strategies, increasing productivity and collaboration, and reducing overhead,” 2009
  - American Institute of Architects Award for the “Design/Delivery Process Innovation Using BIM,” Technology in Architectural Practice Award, 2010
  - Green Building of America Award of The Building of America, for “building an innovative and sustainable facility,” 2010
  - International Interior Design Association (IIDA) New England Award for “Best Office in the 30,000-to-80,000-square-foot category,” 2010
  - AGC Build New England Honor Award for “outstanding project teamwork,” 2009
  - Constructech Vision Award, 2009
  - Best New World Class Briefing Center, Association of Briefing Program Managers, 2009
