= Quintus Marcius Philippus =

Quintus Marcius Philippus was a name used by men of the gens Marcia in Ancient Rome. They belonged to the Marcii Philippi.

- Quintus Marcius, grandfather of the consul in 281 BC.
- Quintus Marcius Q.f., father of the consul in 281 BC. Possibly the same person as Quintus Marcius Tremulus.
- Quintus Marcius Philippus, consul in 281 BC, triumphed over the Etruscans, nominated magister equitum in 263 by the dictator Gnaeus Fulvius Maximus Centumalus.
- Quintus Marcius Philippus, praetor in 188 BC of Sicily, consul in 186 and 169, later censor in 164.
- Quintus Marcius Q. f. L. n. Philippus, son of the consul in 186 and 169 BC, served under his father in Macedonia.
- Quintus Marcius Philippus, according to Cicero, was condemned, and went into exile at Nuceria, where he became a citizen. He might possibly be the same as the son of the consul of 186 and 169 BC.
- Quintus Marcius Philippus, proconsul of Cilicia from 47 to 46 BC.
