= Rogerio da Todi =

Blessed Rogerio da Todi or Rugerio or Roger of Todi (died 5 January 1236) was a Roman Catholic monastic leader, one of the 12 early companions of Saint Francis of Assisi.

He was born and died in Todi. He took the habit of St Francis in 1216. He was a friend and helper for the blessed Philippa Mareri. He is sometimes confused in some manuscripts with Richer delle Marche, another follower of Francis.
