= Lenroot, Wisconsin =

- Town
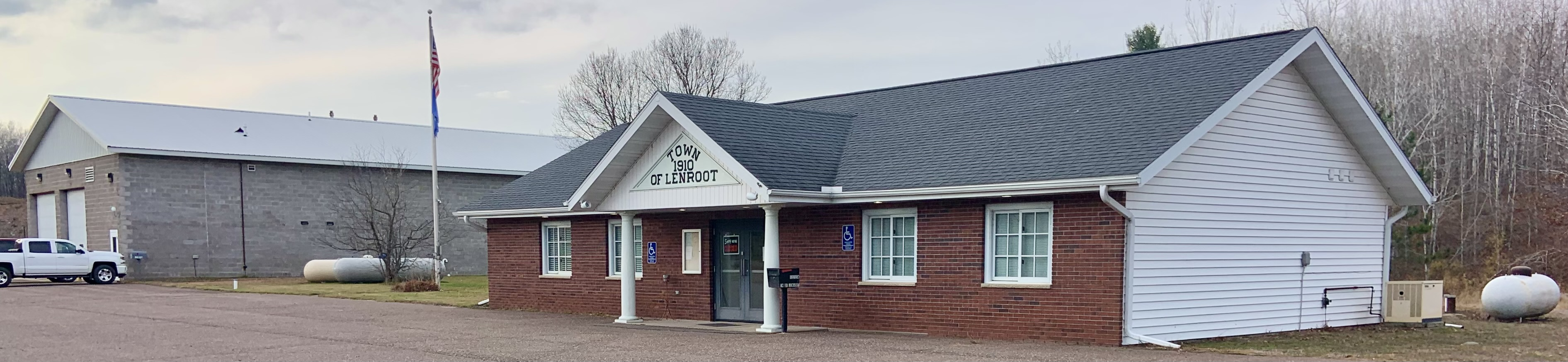
- Town hall

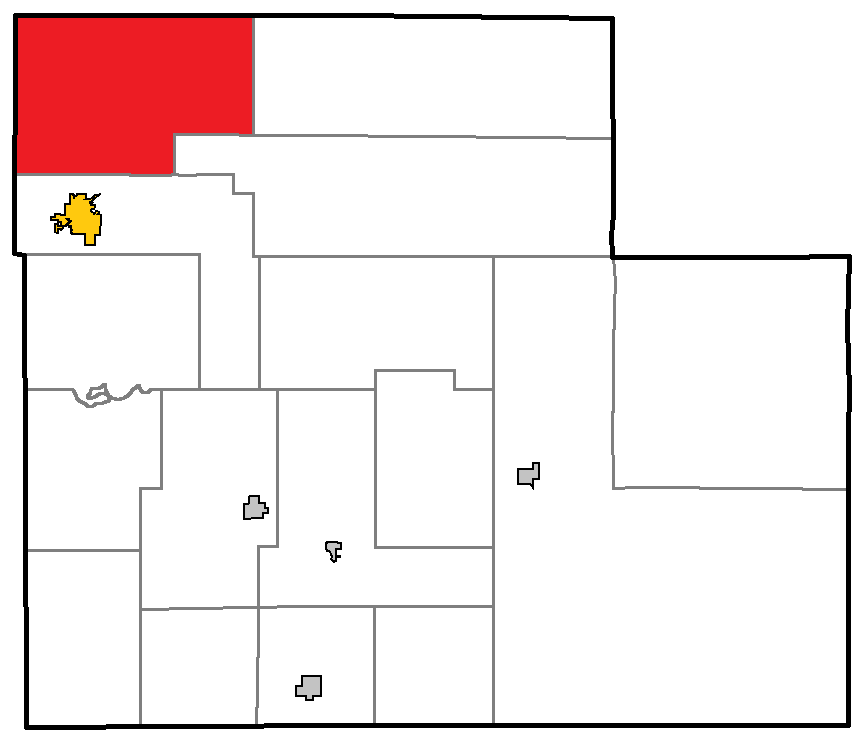
- Location of Lenroot, within Sawyer County
- Coordinates: 46°5′42″N 91°26′6″W
- Country: United States
- State: Wisconsin
- County: Sawyer

Area
  - Total: 88.0 sq mi (227.8 km^{2})
  - Land: 81.7 sq mi (211.5 km^{2})
  - Water: 6.3 sq mi (16.3 km^{2})
- Elevation: 1,276 ft (389 m)

Population (2020)
  - Total: 1,337
  - Density: 16.37/sq mi (6.322/km^{2})
- Time zone: UTC-6 (Central (CST))
  - Summer (DST): UTC-5 (CDT)
- Area codes: 715 & 534
- FIPS code: 55-43400
- GNIS feature ID: 1583542
- Website: https://www.townoflenroot.net/

Lenroot is a town in Sawyer County, Wisconsin, United States. The population was 1,337 at the 2020 census.

== Communities ==
- Phipps is located along Phipps Road, 4.8 miles northeast of Hayward.
- Seeley is located at the intersection of US Route 63 and County Road OO.

== Geography ==
According to the United States Census Bureau, the town has a total area of 87.9 square miles (227.8 km^{2}), of which 81.7 square miles (211.5 km^{2}) is land and 6.3 square miles (16.3 km^{2}) (7.15%) is water.

== Demographics ==
As of the census of 2000, there were 1,165 people, 479 households, and 346 families residing in the town. The population density was 14.3 people per square mile (5.5/km^{2}). There were 986 housing units at an average density of 12.1 per square mile (4.7/km^{2}). The racial makeup of the town was 96.39% White, 1.63% Native American, 0.26% Asian, 0.17% from other races, and 1.55% from two or more races. Hispanic or Latino of any race were 0.17% of the population.

There were 479 households, out of which 29.0% had children under the age of 18 living with them, 62.0% were married couples living together, 6.1% had a female householder with no husband present, and 27.6% were non-families. 21.9% of all households were made up of individuals, and 9.0% had someone living alone who was 65 years of age or older. The average household size was 2.43 and the average family size was 2.84.

In the town, the population was spread out, with 23.3% under the age of 18, 5.5% from 18 to 24, 25.9% from 25 to 44, 31.5% from 45 to 64, and 13.7% who were 65 years of age or older. The median age was 42 years. For every 100 females, there were 108.0 males. For every 100 females age 18 and over, there were 110.6 males.

The median income for a household in the town was $35,000, and the median income for a family was $45,481. Males had a median income of $31,500 versus $23,611 for females. The per capita income for the town was $19,230. About 9.1% of families and 8.7% of the population were below the poverty line, including 6.5% of those under age 18 and 13.6% of those age 65 or over.
