= Philip Coppens =

Philip Coppens may refer to:

- Philip Coppens (chemist) (1930–2017), professor of chemistry and crystallography
- Philip Coppens (author) (1971–2012), writer on ancient and alternative history
