= Émile Guimet =

French industrialist, traveler and connoisseur (1836–1918)

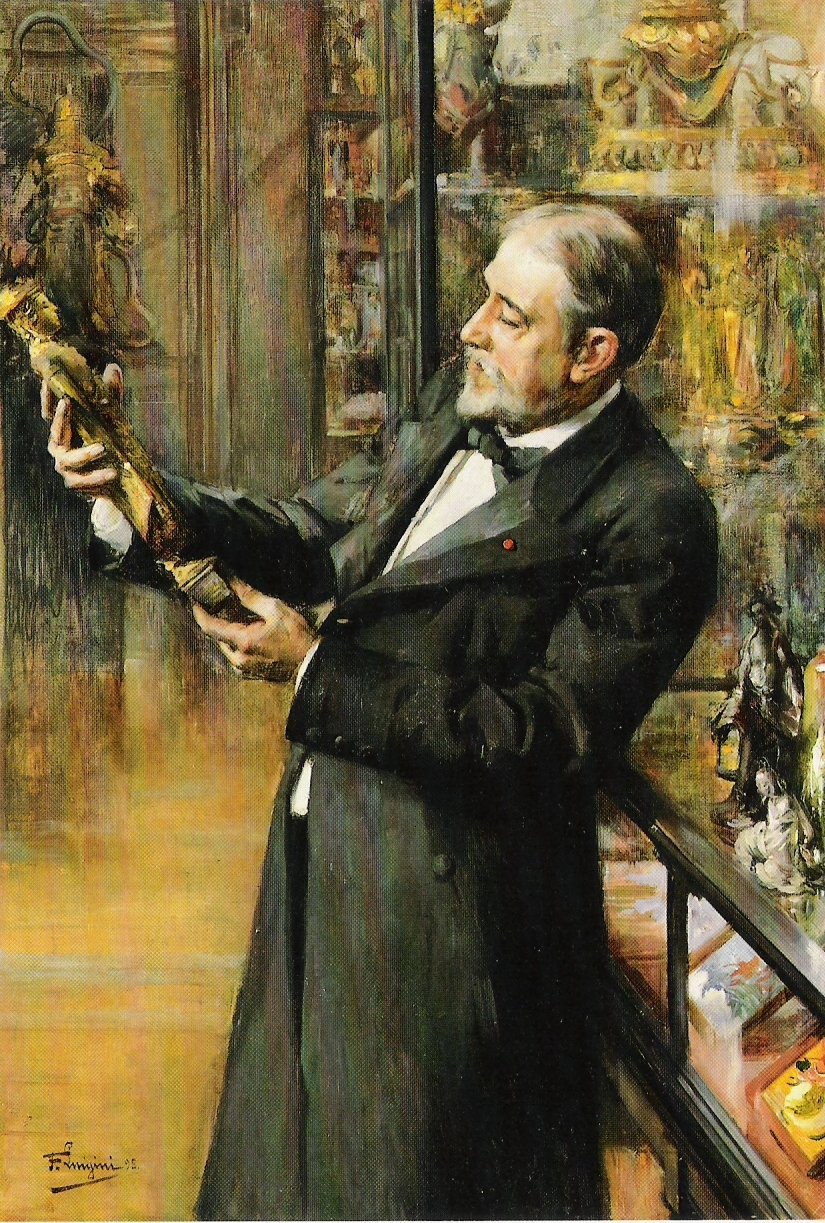
- Émile Étienne Guimet in his Museum, by Ferdinand Jean Luigini, 1898
- Born: Émile Étienne Guimet; 2 June 1836; Lyon, France
- Died: 12 October 1918 (aged 82); Fleurieu-sur-Saône, France
- Occupations: Industrialist, traveler and connoisseur
- Known for: Founder of the Musée Guimet

Émile Étienne Guimet (French pronunciation: [emil ɡimɛ]; 2 June 1836 – 12 October 1918) was a French industrialist, traveler and connoisseur. An important collector of artefacts related to Oriental religions and Asian arts, Guimet is the founder of the Guimet Museum. Today, it houses one of the world’s most comprehensive collections of Asian art, which includes items from Cambodia, Thailand, Vietnam, Tibet, India, and Nepal, among other countries.

== Life and career ==
Émile Guimet was born in Lyon and succeeded his father Jean-Baptiste Guimet in the direction of his "artificial ultramarine" factory. He also founded the Musée Guimet, which was first located at Lyon in 1879 and was handed over to the state and transferred to Paris in 1885.

In Lyon he also established a library and a school for Oriental languages. Guimet aimed at spreading knowledge of Oriental civilizations, and facilitating religious studies, through sacred images and religious objects.

Devoted to travel, he was in 1876 commissioned by the minister of public instruction to study the religions of the Far East, and the museum contains many of the fruits of this expedition, including a fine collection of Japanese and Chinese porcelain and many objects relating not merely to the religions of the East but also to those of Ancient Egypt, Greece and Rome.

In 1945 Georges Salles, director of the Museums of France, redistributed the collections of national museum. The great collections of Asian arts of the Louvre Museum were transferred to the Musee Guimet. As a result, the Guimet became one of the greatest museums of Asian art in the world. It provides the most comprehensive panorama of Asian arts under one umbrella.

Mata Hari was his long-time mistress.

In 1880 he started publishing the Annales du Musee Guimet, in which original articles appear on Oriental religions.

He wrote Lettres sur l'Algerie (1877) and Promenades japonaises (1880), and also some musical compositions, including a grand opera, Tai-Tsoung (1894)

The Émile Guimet Prize for Asian Literature was created in his honour in 2017.
