= Philippe Petitcolin =

French business executive

- Born: 1952 (age 73–74); Saint-Mihiel, France
- Education: University of Nancy; HEC Paris
- Occupation: Businessman
- Title: Former CEO, Safran
- Term: 2015-2020
- Successor: Olivier Andriès
- Board member of: Safran; GIFAS; Belcan Corporation; Aerospace and Defence Industries Association of Europe

Philippe Petitcolin (born 1952) is a French businessman, and the CEO of Safran from April 2015 to December 2020.

Petitcolin was born in 1952. He earned a bachelor's degree in mathematics, followed by an Executive MBA from the Centre de Perfectionnement aux Affaires (CPA), now part of HEC Paris since 2002.

He was appointed as CEO of Safran in April 2015 and left the position at the end of 2020.

He has been the vice-chairman of c (ASD) (Belgium) since April 2015.

Business positions
Preceded by Jean-Paul Herteman	CEO of Safran; 2015–present	Succeeded by Olivier Andriès
