= Philip Rünz =

German politician (born 1997)

Member of the Landtag of Rhineland-Palatinate
- Assuming office 18 May 2026
- Succeeding: Anna Köbberling
- Constituency: Koblenz

Personal details
- Born: 1 September 1997 (age 28)
- Party: Christian Democratic Union

Philip Rünz (born 1 September 1997) is a German politician who was elected member of the Landtag of Rhineland-Palatinate in 2026. He has served as chairman of the Young Union in Koblenz since 2022.
