= Mary Zelia Pease Philippides =

American archaeologist (1906–2009)

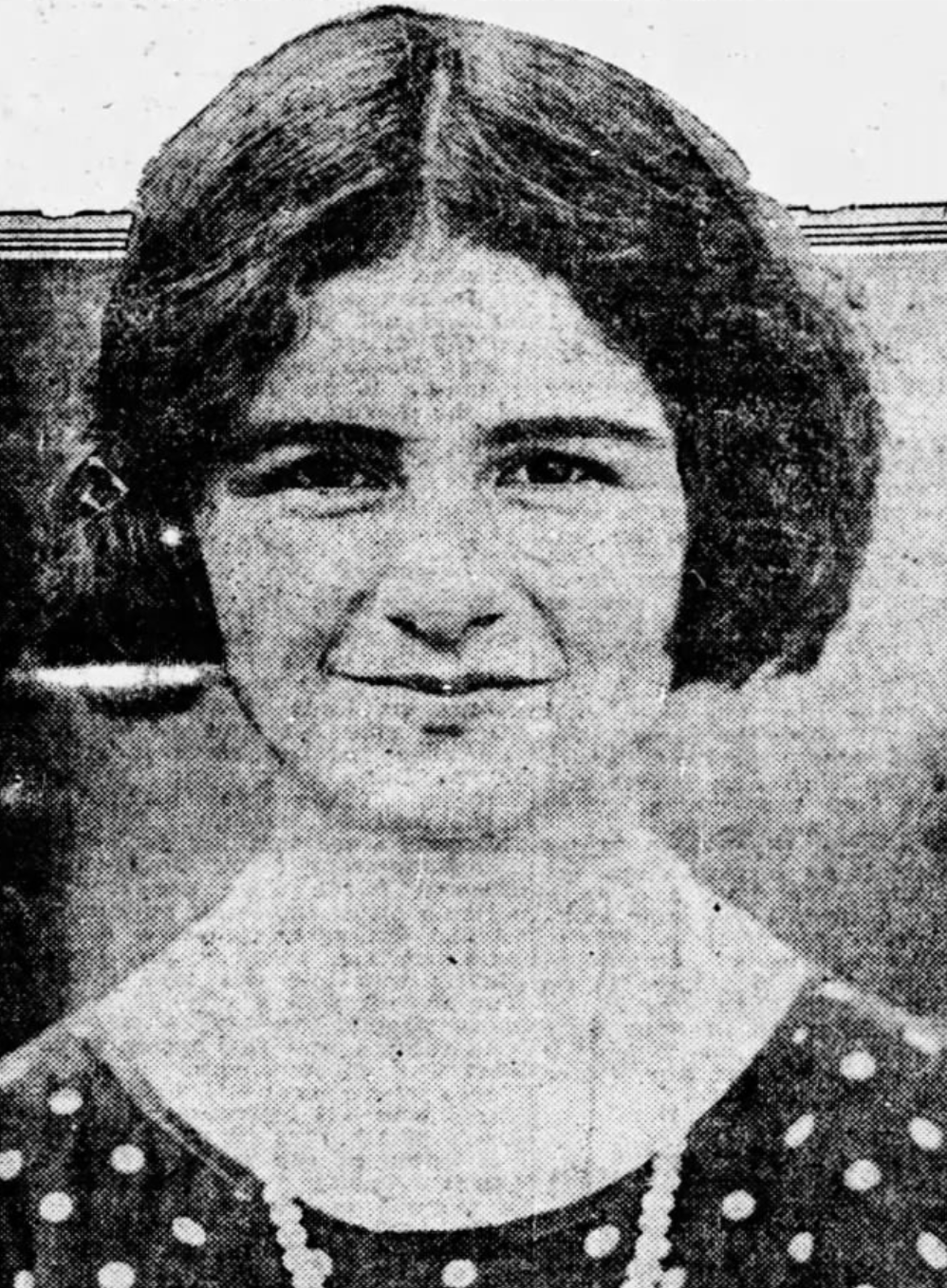
- Mary Zelia Pease as a teenager, from a 1923 newspaper
- Born: Mary Zelia Pease; January 16, 1906
- Died: January 23, 2009 (aged 103)
- Other name: Maria Zelia Pease Philippides
- Occupations: Librarian, archaeologist
- Spouse: John Philippides

Mary Zelia Pease Philippides (January 16, 1906 – January 23, 2009) was an American archaeologist and librarian. She was librarian at the American School for Classical Studies in Athens from 1958 to 1971.

== Early life and education ==
Pease was born in New York City, the daughter of Lewis Frederic Pease and Laurette Eustis Potts Pease. Her mother was a social worker; her father was an organist and music librarian, and taught at the New England Conservatory of Music and at the Yale School of Music. She attended the Chapin School, and a girls' school in Switzerland, and graduated from Bryn Mawr College in 1927. She worked on excavations in Greece after college, and completed doctoral studies in archaeology in 1933. Her dissertation was titled "A Catalogue of the Greek Vases in the Collection of Albert Gallatin in New York City".

== Career ==
Pease taught at Bryn Mawr College and at the Shipley School as a young woman. She was book review editor for the American Journal of Archaeology in the 1940s. She worked for the United Nations Relief and Works Agency and the Greek War Relief Association during and after World War II. She taught at the Hotchkiss School in the 1950s. She was an archaeologist who spent several residencies in Athens until she was appointed librarian at the American School of Classical Studies in Athens in 1958. She retired in 1971. She was one of several Bryn Mawr and Wellesley alumni involved in excavations in Greece in the 1930s, a group that included Hetty Goldman, Dorothy Cox, and Virginia Randolph Grace.

== Publications ==
- "The Pottery from the North Slope of the Acropolis" (1935)
- "A Well of the Late Fifth Century at Corinth" (1937)
- Corpus Vasorum Antiquorum, U.S.A.: volume 8, Fogg Museum and Gallatin Collections (1942, with George H. Chase)
- "Attic Black-Figured Pottery" (1986, with Mary B. Moore and Dietrich von Bothmer)

== Personal life ==
Pease married Greek-born American educator John Argyros Philippides in 1946. They had a daughter, Dia. Mary Zelia Pease Philippides died in 2009, at the age of 103.
