= Phipps, Wisconsin =

- Unincorporated community
- Location within Wisconsin Location within the United States
- Coordinates: 46°03′46″N 91°24′49″W
- Country: United States
- State: Wisconsin
- County: Sawyer
- Elevation: 1,230 ft (370 m)
- Time zone: UTC-6 (Central (CST))
  - Summer (DST): UTC-5 (CDT)
- Area codes: 715 & 534
- GNIS feature ID: 1571301

Phipps is an unincorporated community located in the town of Lenroot, Sawyer County, Wisconsin, United States.

== History ==
A post office called Phipps was in operation between 1883 and 1907. The community was named for W. H. Phipps, a railroad official.
