= UCD Philosophy Society =

University collective

The Philosophy Society of University College Dublin (UCD Philsoc) was founded in 1965. The purpose of the society is to "encourage the learning, thinking and discussion of philosophical ideas; and to act as a social forum of exchange for those interested in philosophical or intellectual matters".

== Events ==
The Philosophy Society regularly invites notable speakers to deliver individual addresses. Former speakers have included Milo Yiannopoulos, Robert Fisk, Holocaust survivor Tomi Reichental, Norman Finkelstein, Professor Richard Swinburne and Professor Noam Chomsky.

The society hosts public debates in which both topical issues and age-old philosophical questions are discussed. Speakers in the debates consist of UCD students and of academics. In 2016, the society hosted a debate on the Israeli–Palestinian conflict with the Palestinian Ambassador to Ireland (Ahmad Abdelrazek) and Israeli Ambassador to Ireland (Boaz Modai).
