= Big Fill =

Coordinates: 41°38′29″N 112°28′44″W

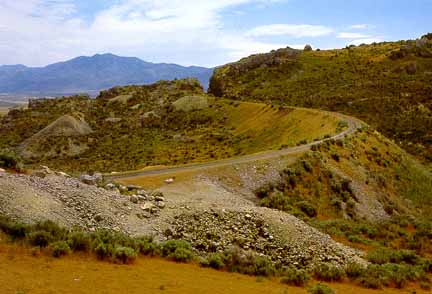
- Central Pacific Big Fill; one of the embankments built for the Union Pacific's Big Trestle is visible on the left side of this photograph, taken from the north end of the Big Fill, directed south.

History
- Commenced: February 1869
- Opened: 1870
- Completed: 26 April 1869
- Closed: September 1942

Technical
- Track gauge: 1,435 mm (4 ft 8 1/2 in) standard gauge

The Big Fill was an engineering project on the first transcontinental railroad in the U.S. state of Utah. To avoid a costly 800-foot (240 m) tunnel through mountainous terrain east of Promontory Summit, Central Pacific engineers mapped an alternate route that still needed to span the deep Spring Creek Ravine.

== Events of 1869 ==
In February 1869, the construction firm of Benson, Farr, & West began construction on a raised bed across the ravine. Over two months, 500 workers hauled more than 10,000 cubic yards (7,600 m^{3}) of material to build the rail bed. At its completion on April 26, the fill extended for 500 feet (150 m) and up to a depth of 70 feet (21 m). The cuts for the Big Fill required 1,500 kegs of black powder.

=== Big Trestle ===
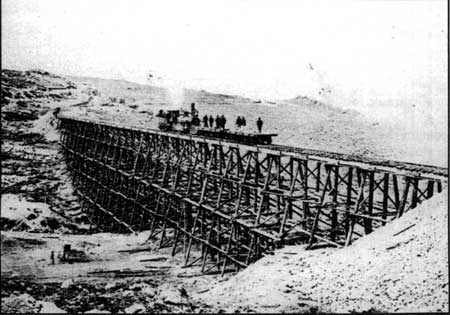
The Union Pacific Big Trestle

150 yards (140 m) east of the Big Fill, the Union Pacific line was also attempting to cross the same ravine. The Union Pacific was several months behind Central Pacific, and opted to build a wooden trestle instead of using an earthen fill, starting on March 28. The Big Trestle was built in 36 days and was completed on May 5, only 5 days before the golden spike ceremony at Promontory Summit. The Big Trestle, intended to serve as a temporary measure until a permanent fill could be constructed, was 400 feet (120 m) long and 80 to 85 feet (24 to 26 m) high.

Nothing that I could write would convey an idea of the flimsy character of [the Big Trestle]. It is composed of round timbers standing upright. The cross pieces are jointed in the most clumsy manner. It looks rather like the "false work" which has to be put up during the construction of such works. The winds are sometimes very boisterous in these regions, and it would not surprise me if it was blown down the first severe storm. It is upwards of 80 feet high. I would not ride over it for all the money that James Fisk, Jr., expects to realize by his late raid on the Union Pacific. The Central Pacific have a fine, solid embankment alongside it, which ought to be used as the track.

— Daily Alta California (May 1, 1869)

Since Union Pacific were responsible for the transcontinental route east of Promontory, the track was laid across the Big Trestle. However, shortly after completion, the trestle was faulted as weak; in addition, there was a grade across the trestle and a curve at one end.

=== Line moved ===
Because Congress had fixed the point of junction as Ogden, not Promontory, controversy over the control of the segment between Promontory and Ogden ensued, but the two companies eventually came to an agreement to move the junction to Ogden, with Central Pacific compensating Union Pacific for the cost of construction materials and labor. Six months after the completion ceremony, Central Pacific was awarded control of that segment. They opted to move the rail line from the poor-quality Big Trestle to the Big Fill, where it remained in use until the rails were removed in 1942, although main line traffic was moved off the Promontory route in 1903 with the completion of the Lucin Cutoff.

Today both sites are part of the Golden Spike National Historic Site; a walking trail from the East Grade Auto Tour takes tourists to view the Big Fill and the remains of the Big Trestle.
