= Phillip Island (disambiguation) =

Phillip Island is an island in the Australian state of Victoria.

Phillip Island may also refer to:

- Phillip Island (Norfolk Island), an island south of Norfolk Island
- Stephens Island (British Columbia), formerly known as Philip Island

== Other uses ==
- Phillip Island Grand Prix Circuit
- Phillip Island Important Bird Area
- Phillip Island Nature Park
