= Philippe d'Orléans =

Philippe d'Orléans may refer to:

- Philip of Valois, Duke of Orléans (1336-1376), the second surviving son of Philip VI of France
- Philip, Count of Vertus (1396-1420), the second son of Louis I, Duke of Orléans
- Philippe I, Duke of Orléans (1640-1701), only surviving sibling of Louis XIV of France
- Philippe II, Duke of Orléans (1674-1723), son of Philippe I and Regent of France, 1715-23
- Louis Philippe II, Duke of Orléans (1747-1793), great grandson of Philippe II and father of Louis Philippe of France
- Prince Philippe, Count of Paris (1838-1894), grandson and heir-apparent to the throne of Louis Philippe of France
- Prince Philippe, Duke of Orléans (1869–1926), son of the Count of Paris
