= Miriam Lips =

Dutch-born academic in New Zealand (born 1967)

Anna Maria Barbara Lips
- Born: 1967-12-30; Ulvenhout
- Died: 2024-08-12; Wellington
- Education: Erasmus University Rotterdam
- Scientific career
- Fields: Digital Government
- Workplaces: Erasmus University Rotterdam, Tilburg University, Victoria University of Wellington.
- Thesis: Autonomie in kwaliteit : ambiguïteit in bestuurlijke communicatie over de ontwikkeling van kwaliteitszorg in het Hoger Onderwijs (1996)

Anna Maria Barbara "Miriam" Lips (born 1967) is a Dutch-born academic in New Zealand. She holds the chair in digital government at the Victoria University of Wellington.

== Academic career ==
After a 1996 PhD titled 'Autonomie in kwaliteit: ambiguïteit in bestuurlijke communicatie over de ontwikkeling van kwaliteitszorg in het Hoger Onderwijs' at the Erasmus University Rotterdam, she worked at University of Oxford and Tilburg University before moving to the Victoria University of Wellington.

Lip's work on digital inclusion has been covered by the press and she holds a number of appointments in government.

== Selected works ==
- Lips, Miriam. "E-government is dead: Long live public administration 2.0." Information Polity 17, no. 3, 4 (2012): 239–250.
- Taylor, John, Miriam Lips, and Joe Organ. "Information-intensive government and the layering and sorting of citizenship." Public Money and Management 27, no. 2 (2007): 161–164.
- Lips, Miriam. "E-government under construction: challenging traditional conceptions of citizenship." In E-government in Europe, pp. 61–75. Routledge, 2006.
- Taylor, John A., Miriam Lips, and Joe Organ. "Identification practices in government: citizen surveillance and the quest for public service improvement." Identity in the Information Society 1, no. 1 (2008): 135.
- Lips, Miriam. "Does public administration have artefacts?." Information Polity 12, no. 4 (2007): 243–252.
