= Phillip Walsh =

Phillip Walsh or Phil Walsh may refer to:

- Phil Walsh (Australian footballer) (1960–2015), former coach of Adelaide in the Australian Football League and player
- Phil Walsh (English footballer) (born 1984), current professional association footballer in England, most recently for Bath City
- Phil K. Walsh (died 1935), Australian actor and silent film producer
