= Jean-Baptiste Guimet =

19th-century French industrial chemist

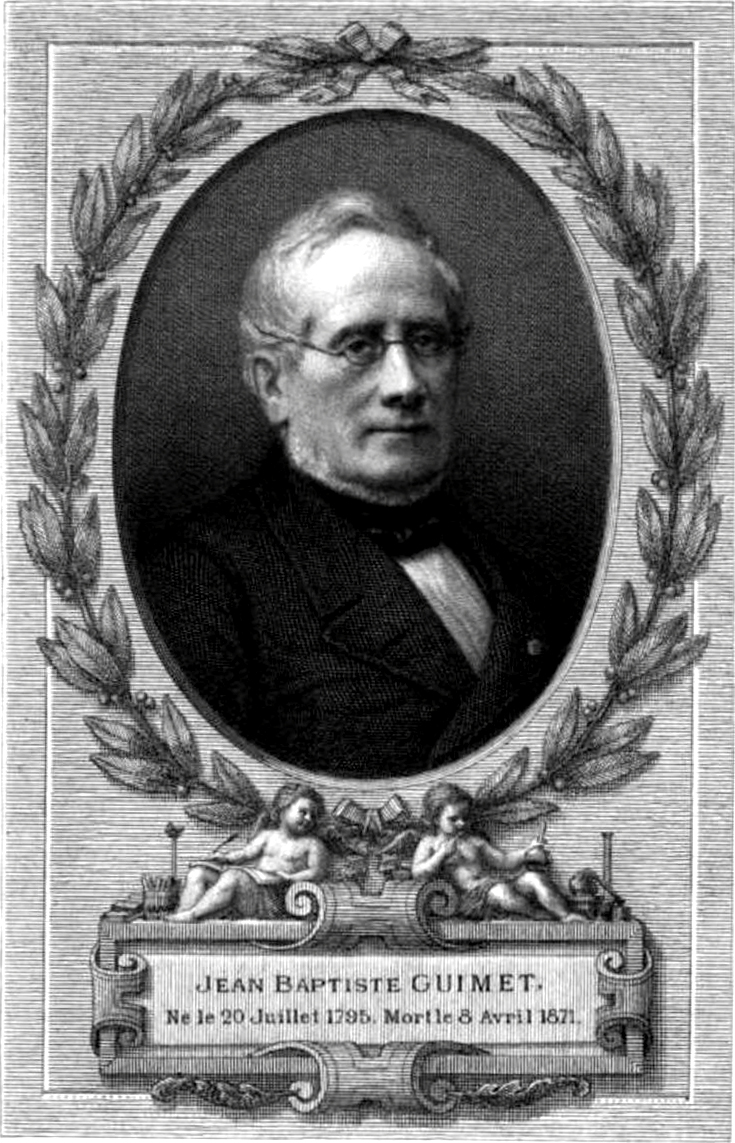
- Jean-Baptiste Guimet
- Born: 20 July 1795; Voiron, France
- Died: 8 April 1871 (aged 75)
- Occupation: industrial chemist
- Notable work: synthetic colors

Jean-Baptiste Guimet (20 July 1795 – 8 April 1871), French industrial chemist, and inventor of synthetic colors, was born at Voiron, Isère.

He studied at the École Polytechnique in Paris, and in 1817 entered the Administration des Poudres et Salpêtres. As natural lazurite was expensive and inaccessible, different options for its artificial production were explored in Europe. Jean Baptiste Guimet discovered a synthetic route in 1826. He finally prepared the synthetic lazurite, called ultramarine in 1828. It was also called as French ultramarine. In 1828 he was awarded the prize offered by the Société d’encouragement pour l’industrie nationale for a process of making artificial ultramarine with all the properties of the substance prepared from expensive natural source lapis lazuli; and six years later he resigned his official position in order to devote himself to the commercial production of that material, a factory for which he established at Fleurieu-sur-Saône.

His son Émile Étienne Guimet succeeded him in the direction of the factory.

== Notes ==
Lapis lazuli (blue stone) was originally brought to Europe from Afghanistan. It becomes very expensive due to its source and the difficulties involved in its preparation process. It has been described as ultramarine (beyond the sea).
