= Philippa =

- Pronunciation: FIL-i-pa
- Gender: Female

Origin
- Origin: Greek
- Meaning: "lover of horses"
- Region of origin: English speaking countries

Other names
- Related names: Filippa, Filipa, Pippa, Phillipa, Phillippa, Philipa, Philippe, Philippine

Philippa is a feminine given name meaning "lover of horses" or "horses' friend", from the Greek Philippos, which is derived from philein, meaning to love and hippos, meaning horse. The English masculine form is Philip, which was formerly the vernacular form for both sexes. The Latinate Philippa was used in official church records for women bearing the name in medieval times, but they were actually called Philip or the French Philippe. The name Philippa came into common use for women in the Anglosphere in the 1800s. Common alternative spellings include Filippa and Phillipa. Less common is Filipa. The name is commonly shortened to the nicknames Pippa, Pippy, Pippita, Pipka, Pippulina, and Pip.

Notable people with the name Philippa include:

== Pre-modern era ==
- Philippa, 5th Countess of Ulster (1355–1382), English noblewoman and granddaughter of Edward III of England
- Philippa, Countess of Toulouse (c. 1073–1118), suo jure Countess of Toulouse and Duchess of Aquitaine
- Philippa of Antioch (1148–1178), Lady of Toron
- Philippa of Armenia (1183 – before 1219), Empress consort of Nicaea
- Philippa of Catania (died 1345), Sicilian woman of low birth who became an influential figure in the royal court of the Kingdom of Naples
- Philippa of Champagne (1197–1250), Lady of Ramerupt and de Vénisy
- Philippa of Coimbra (1437–1497), Portuguese noblewoman and nun
- Philippa of England (1394–1430), daughter of Henry IV of England, Queen of Sweden, Denmark and Norway
- Philippa of Guelders (1464–1547), Duchess consort of Lorraine
- Philippa of Hainault (c. 1310/15–1369), queen consort of Edward III of England
- Philippa of Lancaster (1360–1415), English princess, consort queen of Portugal
- Philippa of Luxembourg (1252–1311), Countess consort of Holland, Zeeland, and Hainaut
- Philippa Basset (died 1265), Countess of Warwick
- Philippa Coningsby (died 1596), English aristocrat
- Philippa de Beauchamp (1344–1386), Countess of Stafford
- Philippa de Coucy (1367–1411), Countess of Oxford, Duchess of Ireland
- Philippa de Mohun (c. 1367–1431), Duchess of York
- Philippa de Roet (c. 1346 – c. 1387), wife of Geoffrey Chaucer
- Philippa Flower (died 1619), one of the Witches of Belvoir who was executed by hanging for witchcraft
- Philippa Mareri (died 1236), beatified foundress of the Catholic monastery of Franciscan Sisters of Saint Philippa Mareri, also known as Poor Clares
- Philippa Mortimer (1375–1400), English noblewoman and great-granddaughter of Edward III of England
- Philippa Neville (1386–after 1453), Baroness Dacre
- Saint Philippa (died 220), Christian martyr and saint

== Modern era ==
- Air Commodore Philippa Marshall (1920–2005), British Royal Air Force officer
- Philippa Ballantine (born 1971), New Zealand author of speculative fiction
- Philippa Blair (1945–2025), New Zealand artist
- Philippa "Phily" Bowden (born 1995), British runner
- Philippa Boyens (born 1962), New Zealand screenwriter
- Philippa Coulthard, Australian actress
- Philippa Cross (born 1966), British rower
- Philippa Cullen (1950–1975), Australian performance artist
- Philippa Dickinson (born 1955), British publisher
- Philippa Dunne, Irish actress and writer
- Philippa Fawcett (1868–1948), English mathematician and educationalist
- Philippa Foot (1920–2010), British philosopher
- Philippa Forrester (born 1968), British television presenter and producer
- Philippa Gardner (born 1965), British computer scientist and academic
- Philippa Gregory (born 1954), British novelist
- Philippa Hanna (born 1984), British singer and songwriter
- Philippa Holland, British jewellery designer
- Philippa Johnson-Dwyer (born 1974), South African para equestrian athlete and double gold medallist
- Philippa Namutebi Kabali-Kagwa (born 1964), Ugandan author and life coach
- Philippa Karsera (born 1977), Cypriot diplomat
- Philippa Langley (born 1962), British writer and producer, best known for her role in the discovery and 2012 exhumation of Richard III
- Philippa Lowthorpe (born 1961), British film and TV director
- Philippa Ngaju Makobore, Ugandan electrical engineer and academic
- Pippa Mann (born 1983), British racing car driver
- Philippa Marrack (born 1945), British immunologist and academic
- Philippa Mdluli (1935/1936–1983), Swaziland businesswoman, child killer, and cannibal
- Pippa Middleton (born 1983), English socialite, author, and sister of Catherine, Duchess of Cambridge
- Philippa Nikulinsky (born 1942), Australian artist and botanical illustrator
- Philippa Northeast (born 1994), Australian actress
- Philippa Pearce (1920–2006), English children's author
- Philippa Perry (born 1957), British psychotherapist and author
- Philippa Roles (1978–2017), Welsh discus thrower
- Philippa Schuyler (1931–1967), American pianist and child prodigy
- Philippa Scott (1918–2010), British wildlife conservationist
- Philippa Smyth (born 1995), Australian footballer
- Phillipa Soo (born 1990), American actress/singer
- Philippa Stewart, Countess of Galloway (1905–1974), American heiress who married into the Scottish aristocracy
- Philippa Strachey (1872–1968), British suffragist
- Philippa Stroud, Baroness Stroud (born 1965), British think tanker
- Philippa Urquhart, British actress
- Philippa Whipple (born 1966), British high court judge and barrister
- Philippa Whitford (born 1958), Scottish politician and breast surgeon
- Phillippa Yaa de Villiers (born 1966), South African poet and performance artist
- Philippa York (born 1958), Scottish journalist and former professional cyclist

== Fictional characters ==
- Philippa Eilhart, in The Witcher Saga novels by Andrzej Sapkowski, the video game and the Netflix TV series
- Philippa Finch (née Featherington), in the Bridgerton novels by Julia Quinn and the Netflix TV series
- Philippa Fisher, titular character of the novel series by Liz Kessler
- Philippa Gaunt, in the Children of the Lamp novels
- Philippa Georgiou, in the Netflix series Star Trek: Discovery and the spin off film Star Trek: Section 31
- Philippa Scopes, in the British TV soap opera Coronation Street
- Phillipa Wade, in the Australian TV soap opera Neighbours

== See also ==
- Filipa
