= Philip Molefe =

South African religious leader

- Born: Philip Finkie Molefe; March 30, 1928; Marabastad, Pretoria, South Africa
- Died: August 1, 2020 (aged 92); Sharpeville, Gauteng, South Africa
- Education: North-West University (B.A.)
- Occupation: Religious leader
- Spouse(s): Rose Mngoma (m. 1951; died 2009) Lindi Dube (m. 2011)
- Children: 9, including Phil

Philip Finkie Molefe (30 March 1928 – 1 August 2020) was a South African religious leader involved with the Pentecostal movement.

== Early life and education ==
Phillip Finkie Molefe was born in Marabastad, Pretoria on March 30, 1928. He had two brothers and seven sisters. As an infant, he survived a housefire that left him with burns on his upper body. His survival became a source of inspiration for his future ministry, with some remarking that this event reflected divine protection over his life. As a child, Molefe displayed an unusual spiritual curiosity, often stopping to pray or preach to trees on his way to school. Despite his early inclination toward spirituality, he became a criminal during his youth and was known by the street name “Iron Claw” as a gang leader in Marabastad.

In 1950, after a conversion experience, Molefe enrolled at a bible college in Witbank, at the urging of Nicholas Bhengu. He later attained a B. A. with honors from North-West University in 1998 and received an honorary doctorate.

== Ministry ==
Following his studies, he settled in Sharpeville and pioneered Pentecostal ministry in the surrounding areas. This included founding Assemblies of God missions and later Christian Centre Churches International.

In 1954, Molefe spearheaded the Sharpeville Reival in the area. Residents turned to Christianity, renouncing criminal activities. The movement expanded across South Africa, with Molefe and Bengu conducting crusades characterized by spiritual fervor and reports of miracles. His ministry reached neighboring countries, including Botswana and Lesotho, and he preached internationally in the United States and Europe.

Molefe's ministry coincided with apartheid's intensification. While his focus remained spiritual, he supported political causes aligned with egalitarianism. As a member of the South African Council of Churches, he advocated for the rights of marginalized communities. He played a prominent role in organizing mass funerals for victims of the Sharpeville Massacre in 1960. During the 1980s Vaal uprisings, Molefe’s ministry provided spiritual and material to political prisoners and their families. Molefe's ministry spanned seven decades, and he remained active into his 90s.

== Personal life and death ==
Molefe married Rose Mngoma in 1951 and had 9 children. His son, Philip Molefe Jr., was the CEO of SABC News, the state-owned news corporation of South Africa. Rose Molefe, a school teacher and prominent community leader, died in 2009. In 2011, he married Lindi Dube Sbisi.

Molefe died in Sharpeville on August 1, 2020, at the age of 92.
