= Philadelphia (disambiguation) =

Philadelphia is the largest city in the U.S. state of Pennsylvania.

Philadelphia may also refer to:

== Places ==
=== United States ===
- Philadelphia, Illinois
- Philadelphia, Indiana
- Philadelphia, Mississippi
- Philadelphia, Missouri
- Philadelphia, New York
  - Philadelphia (village), New York
- Philadelphia, Tennessee
- Philadelphia County, Pennsylvania, a county coterminous with the city of the same name
  - Center City, Philadelphia, the old city of Philadelphia before consolidation with the county

=== Other places ===
==== Ancient ====
- Philadelphia (Amman), the capital of Jordan, called Philadelphia during the Hellenistic and Roman periods
- Philadelphia (Cilicia), a town and bishopric of ancient Cilicia
- Philadelphia (Lydia) or Alaşehir, home of one of the seven churches of Asia Minor in the Book of Revelation
- Philadelphia (Faiyum), an ancient Egyptian settlement established by Pharaoh Ptolemy II Philadelphus in the 3rd century BC

==== Modern ====
- Philadelphia, Tyne and Wear, a village north of Houghton-le-Spring, City of Sunderland, UK
- Philadelphia, Western Cape, a town in South Africa
- Philadelphia, Germany, a former village, now part of Storkow, Oder-Spree, Brandenburg

== People ==
- Philadelphia Austen Hancock (1730–1792), aunt of Jane Austen
- Jacob Philadelphia, an 18th-century magician and mystic
- Maureen Allison Philadelphia, a 21st-century politician from Guyana
- Philadelphia Nina Robertson (1866–1951), Australian Red Cross administrator

== Art, entertainment, and media ==
=== Music ===
- "Philadelphia Freedom" (song), by Elton John from the album Captain Fantastic and the Brown Dirt Cowboy
- Philadelphia (band), a Christian metal band from Louisiana
- "Philadelphia", a song by Neil Young from the film Philadelphia
- "Streets of Philadelphia", a song by Bruce Springsteen from the film Philadelphia
- "Philadelphia", a song by alt-J from their 2022 album The Dream

=== Periodicals ===
- Philadelphia (magazine), a regional monthly magazine published in Philadelphia, Pennsylvania
- The Philadelphia Inquirer, a daily newspaper published in Philadelphia, Pennsylvania

=== Film and stage ===
- Philadelphia (film), 1993, directed by Jonathan Demme, starring Tom Hanks and Denzel Washington
- The Philadelphia, a one-act play by David Ives

== Ships ==
- USS Philadelphia (1776), a gunboat sunk in the Battle of Valcour Island
- USS Philadelphia (1799), a 36-gun sailing frigate active in the Quasi-War
- SS City of Philadelphia (1854), an iron-hulled single-screw steamship of the Inman Line that sank on its maiden voyage
- USS Philadelphia (1861), a side-wheel steamer used in the American Civil War
- SS City of Paris (1888), a passenger liner named Philadelphia from 1901 to 1918 and again in 1919–1923
- USS Philadelphia (C-4), a protected cruiser commissioned in 1890 and in service until 1926
- USS Philadelphia (CL-41), a light cruiser commissioned 1937, active in World War II
- USS Philadelphia (SSN-690), a Los Angeles-class attack submarine commissioned in 1977 and decommissioned in 2010

== Other uses ==
- Philadelphia 76ers, a National Basketball Association team
- Philadelphia Cream Cheese, a brand owned by Kraft Foods
- Philadelphia Eagles, a National Football League team
- Philadelphia Flyers, a National Hockey League team
- Philadelphia Phillies, a Major League Baseball team
- Philadelphian cricket team, a first-class cricket team from Philadelphia, Pennsylvania, between 1878 and 1913

== See also ==
- Filadelfia (disambiguation)
- New Philadelphia (disambiguation)
- Philadelphian (disambiguation)
- Philadelphi
- Philadelphus (disambiguation)
- Phillies (disambiguation)
- Philly (disambiguation)
