= Philly (disambiguation) =

Philly is a common informal name for Philadelphia, the largest city in Pennsylvania, United States.

Philly may also refer to:

== People ==
- Corey Philly Brown (born 1991), American football player
- Philly Bryne, a member of the Northern Ireland thrash metal band Gama Bomb
- Philomena Philly Fogarty, Irish camogie player in the 1990s and 2000s
- Philip Philly Larkin (born 1974), Irish hurler
- Philly Lutaaya (1951–1989), Ugandan musician
- Philly Joe Jones (1923–1985), American jazz drummer nicknamed "Philly Joe"

== Arts and entertainment ==
- "Philly" (Fluke song), 2008
- "Philly" (Playboi Carti and Travis Scott song), 2025
- half of the Pete Philly and Perquisite Dutch hip hop duo
- Philly (TV series), an American television series that aired from 2001 to 2002
- Philly Cullen, a character in the play The Playboy of the Western World

== Other uses ==
- Philly (dog), a dog that served in World War I

== See also ==
- Filly, a young female horse
- Phillie Phanatic, the mascot of the Philadelphia Phillies
- The cheesesteak, a type of sandwich originating from Philadelphia, is often referred to as a "Philly cheesesteak" or a "Philly" outside of Philadelphia
- Phillies (disambiguation)
- Philadelphia (disambiguation)
- Philadelphian (disambiguation)
