= Lip Gallagher =

Lip Gallagher may refer to:

- Lip Gallager, character on the British version of the TV series Shameless
- Lip Gallagher, character on the American version of the TV series Shameless
