= Late-inning pressure situation =

Baseball statistic

A late-inning pressure situation is a baseball statistic developed by the Elias Sports Bureau in their annual book The 1985 Elias Baseball Analyst to determine if "clutch hitters" exist. This question was first posed by Richard D. Cramer in his article "Do Clutch Hitters Exist?" published in the 1977 edition of The Baseball Research Journal. According to the Elias Sports Bureau, a Late Inning Pressure Situation is "any at-bat in the seventh inning or later, with the batter's team trailing by three runs or less (or four runs if the bases were loaded)." Development of the late inning pressure situation coincides with an increased attempt to reflect an individual's accomplishments in baseball statistics. In the case of the late inning pressure situation, it attempts to quantify the subjective term "clutch".
