= Philips (surname) =

Philips is a surname. Notable people with the name include:

- Ambrose Philips (1674–1749), English poet
- Anton Philips (1874–1951), Dutch entrepreneur and co-founder of the Royal Philips Electronics; brother of Gerard Philips
- Bilal Philips (born 1946), Canadian Muslim teacher, speaker, and author
- Cyril Philips (1912-2005), British historian and academic director (SOAS)
- Edith Philips (1892–1983), American writer and educator
- Emo Philips (born 1956), American comedian
- Frits Philips (1905–2005), Dutch entrepreneur and co-founder of the Royal Philips Electronics company
- Sir George Philips, 1st Baronet (1766–1847), English Member of Parliament
- Sir George Philips, 2nd Baronet (1789–1874), son of the 1st Baronet, English Member of Parliament
- George Morris Philips (1851–1920), American educator and academic administrator
- Gerard Philips (1858–1942), Dutch entrepreneur and co-founder of the Royal Philips Electronics; brother of Anton Philips
- Gina Philips (born 1970), American actress
- Gwyneth Philips (born 2000), American ice hockey player
- Hrvoje Philips (born 1977), Croatian violist
- Jan Caspar Philips (1690–1775), Dutch engraver
- Judson Philips (1903–1989), American writer
- Katherine Philips (1631–1664), English poet
- Kyle Philips (born 1999), American football player
- Marianne Philips (1886–1951), Dutch writer and politician
- Nanou Philips (born 2007), Belgian ASMR and vlogging influencer
- Peter Philips (1560–1628), English composer, organist, and Catholic priest exiled to Flanders
- Thomas J. Philips (1846–1939), American politician from Pennsylvania

== See also ==
- Philipps, surname
- Philipsz, surname
- Phillips (surname)
- Phillipps, given name and surname
- Phelps (surname)
- Phipps (surname)
