= Philippa Mareri =

Beatified Italian nun

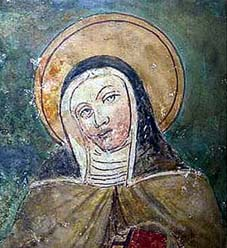

Blessed
- Born: 1190/1200; Borgo San Pietro, Holy Roman Empire
- Died: 1236 (aged 35–46); Poggio Santa Maria, Holy Roman Empire
- Venerated in: Catholicism
- Beatified: 1247 by Innocent IV
- Feast: 16 February
- Patronage: Sulmona

Philippa Mareri (Italian: Filippa Mareri; 1190/1200 – 1236) was the foundress of the monastery of Franciscan Sisters of Saint Philippa Mareri, or Poor Clares. Beatified in 1247, her sanctuary is in Borgo San Pietro, a frazione (borough) of Petrella Salto. Her feast day is 16 February.

== Biography ==
Philippa Mareri was born towards the end of the 12th century into the noble Mareri family, in the family castle at Borgo San Pietro, situated along the road that ran from Assisi to Rome, in the present-day commune of Petrella Salto. Her brother Thomas Mareri held important positions such as that of Mayor of Forlì, and imperial representative in Romagna and Apulia; He was largely responsible for the founding of the city of L'Aquila.

Of prime importance was Philippa's meeting with Francis of Assisi, who introduced her to the monastic life. Her family tried to prevent this choice, so Philippa fled from home along with some companions and took refuge near Mareri, above the village of Piagge, in what is now called the "Grotto of Saint Philippa", and stayed there about three years, until 1228 when her two brothers gave her the castle with the annexed church of San Pietro de Molito.

Philippa moved in with her companions and lived according to the rule of Saint Francis and Saint Clare of Assisi and the nuns of the Church of San Damiano. The spiritual care of the monastery was entrusted by Francis to Roger Todi.

== Cult ==
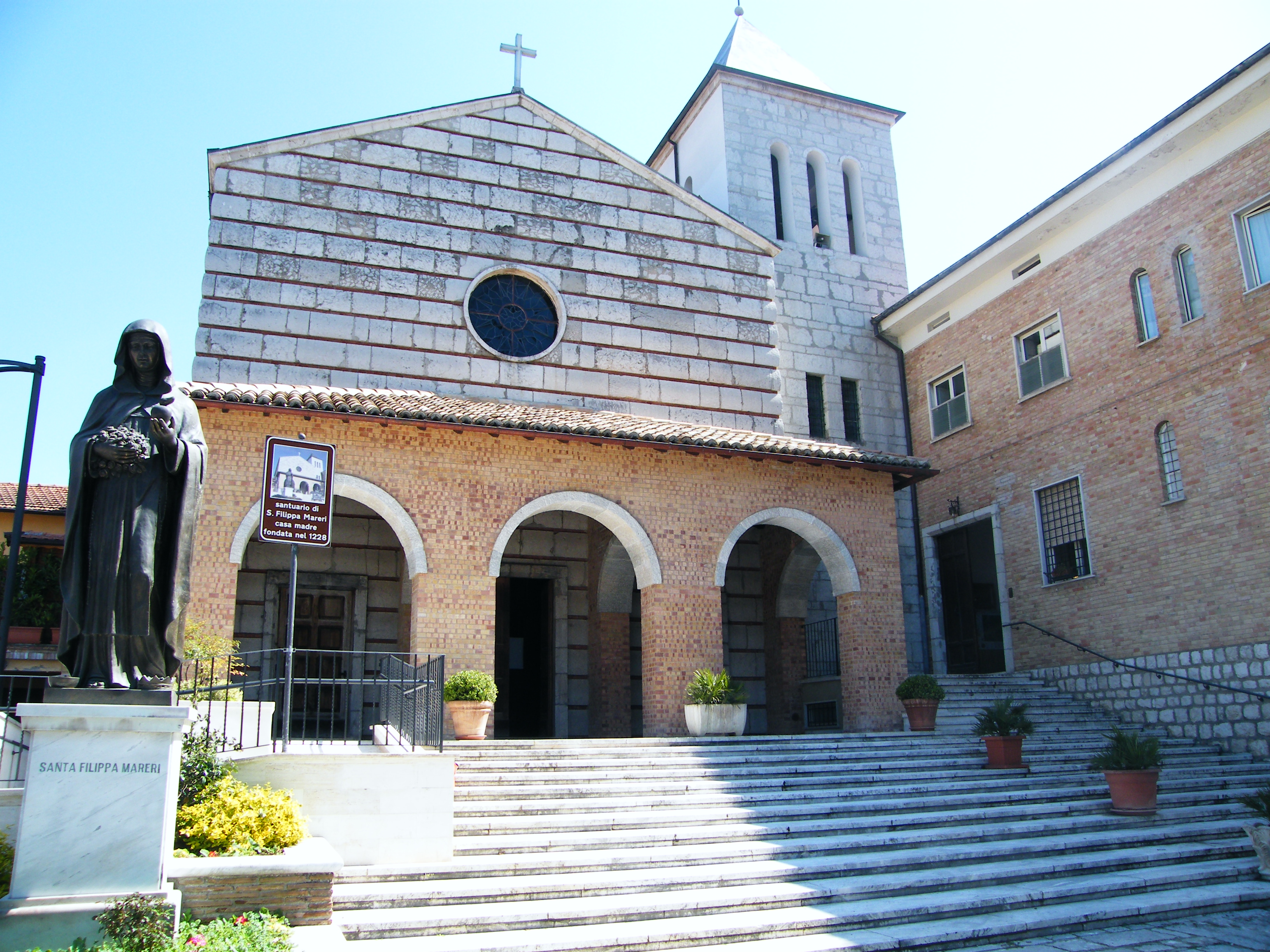
The statue and the sanctuary of Saint Philippa Mareri (Petrella Salto)

Philippa Mareri died on 16 February 1236, in Poggio Santa Maria.

Her tomb became a place of pilgrimage, while there began to be registered many miracles attributed to her intercession. The incorrect, however common, title of Santa ("Saint") first appears in a bull of Innocent IV in 1247, just 11 years after her death. In 1706, during an examination of her remains, it was found that her heart was incorrupt. This is preserved today in a silver reliquary, while her other remains are preserved in the monastery of Borgo San Pietro in the Valle del Salto. Today, nearly eight centuries after her death, the devotion to Philippa and the pilgrimage site has kept on growing not only in her homeland, but also in many other countries and other continents, thanks to the initiative of many emigrants from the region.

The liturgical Memorial of Philippa Mareri falls on 16 February. She is co-patron of Sulmona.

== Bibliography ==
- Sgarbossa, Mario (2000). I Santi e i Beati della Chiesa d'Occidente e d'Oriente (in Italian) (2nd ed.). Milan: Edizioni Paoline. p. 102. ISBN 88-315-1585-3.
