= Lucius Marcius Philippus =

Lucius Marcius Philippus may refer to:

- Lucius Marcius Philippus (consul 91 BC), a distinguished Roman orator in his time and the father of the consul in 56 BC;
- Lucius Marcius Philippus (consul 56 BC), the step-father of the Roman emperor Augustus and the father-in-law of Cato the Younger;
- Lucius Marcius Philippus (consul 38 BC), son of the consul in 56 BC.
