= Philipps =

Philipps is an English, Dutch, and German surname meaning "lover of horses". Derivative, patronym, of the more common ancient Greek name "Philippos" and "Philippides". Philipps has also been a shortened version of Philippson, a German surname especially prevalent amongst German Jews and Dutch Jews. Notable people with this surname are:

- Busy Philipps (born 1979), American film actress
- Chris Philipps (born 1994), Luxembourgish footballer
- Colwyn Philipps, 3rd Viscount St Davids (1939–2009), British peer
- Kinga Philipps (born 1976), American actress
- Rhodri Philipps (born 1966), eldest son of the current Viscount St Davids
- Richard Philipps (1661–1750), British Governor of Nova Scotia
- Sir John Philipps, 6th Baronet (circa 1701–1764), Welsh Jacobite politician
- Sir Owen Cosby Philipps (1863–1937), Knight of Justice of the Order of St John
- Wogan Philipps, 2nd Baron Milford (1902–1993), only member of the Communist Party of Great Britain ever to sit in the House of Lords
- Mount Philipps, a mountain in New Zealand

== See also ==
- Philippe (disambiguation)
- Philipps Baronets
- Philips (surname)
- Phillips (disambiguation)
- Phillipps
