= Felip Comabella i Guimet =

Spanish pharmacist

Felip Comabella i Guimet (May 13, 1841 – May 9, 1901) was a very well-known pharmacist. In 1885 he presented products developed by himself in the Exposition in Antwerp, 1885, and he obtained a gold medal. In 1895 he joined the Royal Academy of Medicine of Catalonia. He had also been nominated commander and knight of the Order of Isabella the Catholic. He had married Concepció Maluquer i Porta.

He opened the Comabella Drugstore at the house of Epifani de Fortuny, on Carme Street number 23, constructed in 1851 by Francesc Daniel Molina i Casamajó, one of the best architects of that time. The drugstore was inherited by his son, Joan Comabella i Maluquer, Biological Sciences bachelor and doctorate in pharmacy in 1897. He married another Maluquer, Josefina Maluquer Anzizu, daughter of Eduard Maluquer i Tirrell, president of the Diputació (1886/90), parliamentary and senator.

The Comabella Drugstore was reconstructed at the beginning of the twentieth century by the architect Guillem Busquets i Vautravens, and became one of the best known modernist buildings in Barcelona. There was still another Comabella in charge of the drugstore, Manuel Comabella i Maluquer, grandson of the Comabella born in Montargull, who finally sold the drugstore in 1946.

== Bibliography ==
- Comabella i Guimet, Felip (1895). Discurso de ingreso en la recepción pública del académico electo (PDF) (in Spanish). Barcelona: Reial Acadèmia de Medicina i Cirurgia de Barcelona. Archived from the original (PDF) on September 24, 2015.
