= Phill =

Phill (usually a diminutive of Phillip) may refer to:

- Phill Brown (born 1950), British audio engineer
- Phill Calvert (born 1958), Australian rock drummer and producer, played in the influential post-punk band "The Birthday Party"
- Phill Davies (born 1981), English rugby union player
- Phill Drobnick (born 1980), American curler
- Phill Grimshaw (1950–1998), English typeface designer and calligrapher
- Phill Hartsfield (1932–2010), Southern California sword and knifemaker
- Phill Jones (born 1974), New Zealand professional basketball player
- Phill Jupitus (born 1962), English comedian, cartoonist, DJ, guitarist, performance poet and presenter of radio and TV
- Phill Kline (born 1959), American former district attorney of Johnson County, Kansas, USA
- Phill Lewis (born 1968), American film and television actor
- Phill G. McDonald (1941–1968), American military personnel
- Phill Niblock (1933–2024), American composer, filmmaker, videographer, and director of Experimental Intermedia
- Phill Nixon (born 1956), English darts player from Ferryhill, County Durham, UK
- Phill Wilson (born 1956), American activist

== See also ==
- Philip (name)
