= Philip II Philoromaeus =

Last Seleucid King of the Syria from 65 to 64 BC

- Friend of the Romans
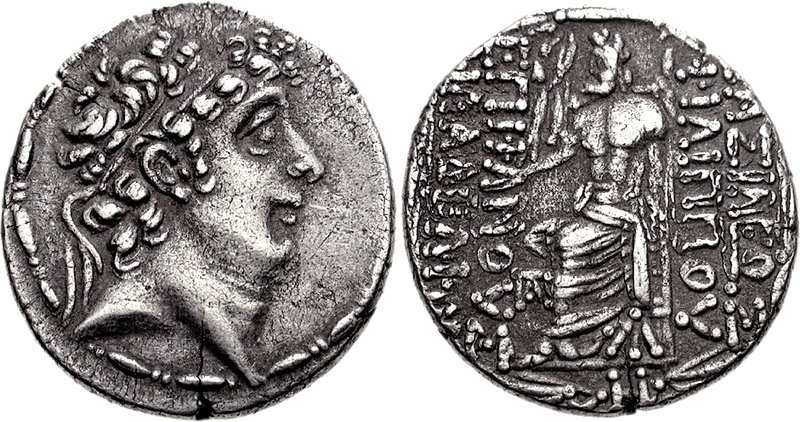
- Coin possibly representing Philip II

King of the Seleucid Empire
- Reign: 65–64 BC - client king under Pompey, for a time in opposition to Antiochus XIII Asiaticus
- Predecessor: Antiochus XIII Asiaticus
- Born: Unknown
- Died: Possibly 56 BC
- Dynasty: Seleucid
- Father: Philip I Philadelphus

Philip II Philoromaeus (Ancient Greek: Φίλιππος ὁ Φιλορωμαῖος, "Friend of the Romans") or Barypous (Βαρύπους, "Heavy-foot"), a ruler of the Hellenistic Seleucid Empire, was the son of the Seleucid king Philip I Philadelphus, and the last Seleucid king.

== Biography ==
Philip II himself briefly ruled parts of Syria in the 60s BC, as a puppet of the Arab warlord Azizus (he never was a client king under Pompey) (Diod. 40.1a-1b). He later competed with his second cousin Antiochus XIII Asiaticus for the favours of the Roman general, but Pompey instead annexed Syria as a Roman province. Both princes attempted to work with Arab warlords to seize power, but Antiochus was murdered and Philip fled into exile (Diod. 40.1a-1b). No coins of Philip II are known, which is unusual for Seleucid rulers (Seleucus V Philometor is the only other king for whom this is the case). This may indicate that Philip did not rule in any of the mint cities.

Philip may have survived his deposition: a Seleucid prince Philip is mentioned as a prospective bridegroom to queen Berenice IV of Egypt, sister of Cleopatra VII in 56 BC. The union was, however, blocked by the Roman governor of Syria Aulus Gabinius who forbade Philip II to accept the offer and possibly had him killed soon after that; Berenice eventually married Philip's cousin Seleucus VII Philometor, only to later have him killed for his lack of manners.

== See also ==
- List of Syrian monarchs
- Timeline of Syrian history

Philip II Philoromaeus Seleucid dynasty Born: Unknown Died: Possibly 56 BC
Regnal titles
Preceded by Antiochus XIII Asiaticus	Seleucid King (King of Syria); 65–64 BC	Annexation to the Roman Republic
