= Filippos =

Filippos is a masculine given name. It may refer to:

- Filippos Filippou (athlete), Cypriot distance runner
- Filippos Filippou (footballer), Cypriot footballer
- Filippos Karvelas, Greek gymnast
- Filippos Margaritis, Greek photographer
- Filippos Pliatsikas, frontman of the Greek band Pyx Lax
- Filippos, music producer and Dj of electronic music
