= Wellesbourne Watermill =

- Location within Warwickshire
- 52°11′14″N 1°35′08″W
- Type: Watermill
- Location: Kineton Road, Wellesbourne
- OS grid reference: SP 28437 54414

History
- Built: 1834

Site notes
- Area: Warwickshire
- Owner: Walton Estate

Listed Building – Grade II
- Official name: Wellesbourne Mill and Mill House
- Designated: 20 April 1988
- Reference no.: 1382030

Wellesbourne Watermill is a fine historic flour mill near Wellesbourne, Warwickshire, England on a domesday site. Situated on the River Dene, the mill is a Grade II listed building and is described as "A very complete example of a mill and mill house".

== History ==
Formerly known as Byford Mill, it was rebuilt in 1834. It ran commercially until 1958, latterly using a belt drive from a traction engine, the wheel last being used in 1939. The mill office door carries a date 1785 which formerly belonged to a post mill which stood in the adjacent field. The mill house is 18th century, thus considerably older than the present mill building.

In 1988 the watermill was restored to working order by the Hamilton family, predominantly Sir Andrew Hamilton, with millwright David Nicholls and the Chiltern Partnership, and is still owned by the Walton Estate. It is not currently open to the public. The adjacent mill house is now a private dwelling.

== Machinery ==
The internal wheel is breastshot and is unusual in that it carries three sets of clasp arms around the timber axle. It measures 17 ft (5.2 m) diameter and 6 ft (1.8 m) wide. An 8 ft (2.4 m) iron pit wheel is driven off the wheel axle and meshes with an iron wallower of 3 ft 2 in (0.97 m). The spur wheel measures 7 ft 4 in (2.24 m) and drives two stone nuts of 18 in (46 cm) diameter.

== See also ==
- List of watermills in the United Kingdom
