= Phillip =

Phillip may refer to:

- Phillip (Bob the Builder), Bob the Builder's character
- Philip (Saliba), Lebanese Orthodox prelate
- Philip (given name), given name
- Phillip (surname), surname
- Phillip, Australian Capital Territory, suburb of Canberra, Australia
- Phillip Bay, suburb in the Eastern Suburbs of Sydney, Australia
- Phillip County, one of the original Nineteen Counties in New South Wales

== See also ==
- Phillip Island (disambiguation)
- Phillips (disambiguation)
- Philip (disambiguation)
- Phillip Chancellor
- Port Philip (disambiguation)
