= Phillip (surname) =

Phillip is an English surname. Notable people with the surname include:

- Abby Phillip (born 1988), American CNN news anchor
- Andy Phillip (1922 – 2001), American professional basketball player
- Aaron Phillip (born 1974), American rapper
- Arthur Phillip (1738 – 1814), British Royal Navy officer
- Joan Phillip (1952 – 2026), Canadian politician
- John Phillip (1817 – 1867), Scottish painter
- John Phillip (poet) (fl.1561), English poet and dramatist of the Elizabethan era
- Mary Phillip (born 1977), English footballer
- Marvin Phillip (born 1984), Trinidadian professional footballer
- Robert Phillip (died 1647) was a Scottish Roman Catholic priest
- Stewart Phillip, Okanagan Aboriginal leader
- Tarik Phillip (born 1993), English-American basketball player
- William Phillip (fl. 1600), English translator

== See also ==
- Phillip (disambiguation)
- Philip (surname)
- Phillips (surname)
