= Kineton =

Village in Warwickshire, England

Coordinates: 52.1566°N 1.5112°W

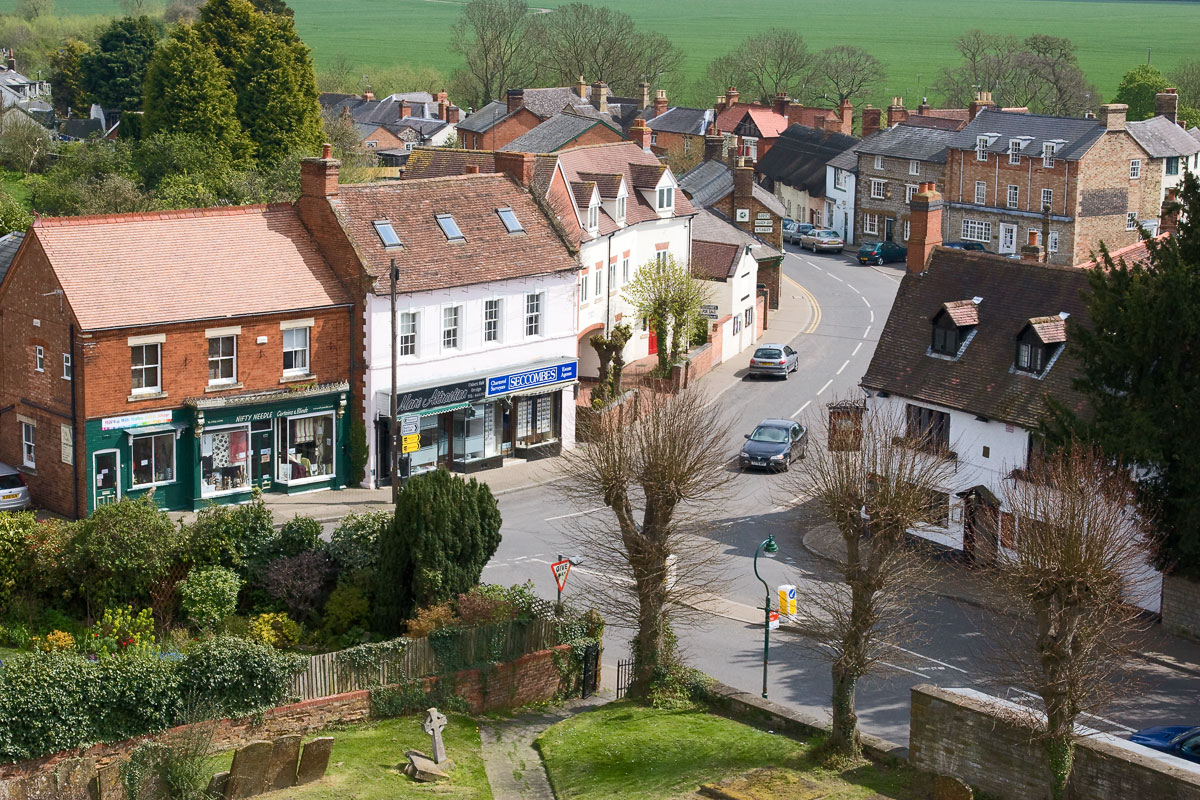
- Kineton village centre

- Location within Warwickshire
- Population: 2,337 (2011 Census)
- OS grid reference: SP335510
  - London: 73 mi (117 km) SE
- Civil parish: Kineton
- District: Stratford-on-Avon
- Shire county: Warwickshire
- Region: West Midlands
- Country: England
- Sovereign state: United Kingdom
- Post town: WARWICK
- Postcode district: CV35
- Dialling code: 01926
- Police: Warwickshire
- Fire: Warwickshire
- Ambulance: West Midlands
- UK Parliament: Kenilworth and Southam
- Website: www.kineton.org.uk

Kineton /ˈkaɪntən/ is a village and civil parish on the River Dene in south-east Warwickshire, England. The village is part of Stratford-on-Avon district, and in the 2001 census it had a population of 2,278, increasing to 2,337 at the 2011 Census.

Kineton is about ten miles (16 km) from the towns of Banbury to the south-east, Warwick and Leamington Spa to the north, and Stratford-upon-Avon to the west. Nearby is the large village of Wellesbourne with its historic water mill, Compton Verney House art gallery, the British Motor Museum at Gaydon, the Burton Dassett Hills country park and the battlefield of Edgehill. Kineton, in the district historically known as the Vale of the Red Horse, can also be considered to be part of the informal area of Banburyshire.

Kineton district council ward covers Gaydon, Lighthorne, Lighthorne Heath, Compton Verney, Combrook, Little Kineton and Chadshunt, a population of 4,228 according to the 2001 census, rising to 4,320 at the 2011 census. The village has some areas of light industry but is largely agricultural; many residents commute to nearby towns and cities for employment, including Banbury, Warwick and Stratford-upon-Avon.

== History ==
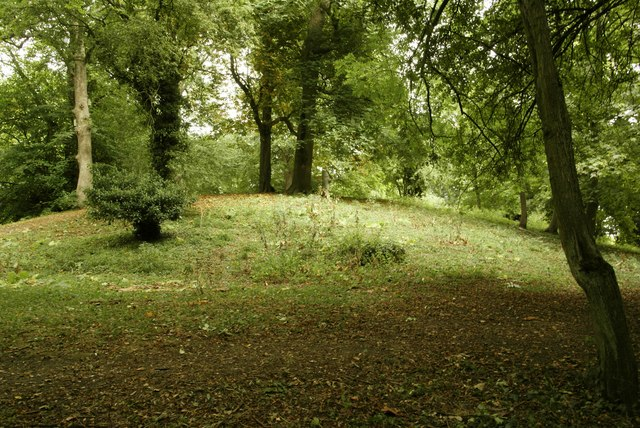
King John's Castle

The first recorded reference to Kineton was in 969, when Saxon King Edgar granted some land here to a trusted counsellor.

The village is mentioned in the Domesday Book as Kington. On the outskirts of the village, at the foot of Pittern Hill, are the remains of the earthworks of a motte-and-bailey castle, known as King John's Castle, so called because it is believed that King John held a Court Leet there. Kineton gave its name to the area of south-east Warwickshire known as Kineton Hundred.

Early in the 13th century, Stephen de Segrave had a Tuesday market in his manor of Kineton, and a fair on the eve and day of St Peter and St Paul. The market died out by 1840, when the market house was pulled down and a school built on its site, but the fair on 5 February continued until recently.

For a period of the English Civil War, Kineton was looted by Prince Rupert with part of the Royalist army. This was after he had defeated Sir James Ramsay, from the Parliamentarians, and by doing this he failed to aid the rest of his army, thus leading to a neutral ending to the Battle of Edgehill on 23 October 1642. A year later, in July 1643, King Charles met with Queen Henrietta Maria at Kineton.

John Newton who lived from 1725 to 1807 and for a while lived in the village of Kineton where he is rumoured to have written the words to "Amazing Grace" in 1772 but there is no contemporary evidence for this.

William Kendall, co-builder of Birmingham Town Hall and subsequent Warwick County Surveyor and Steward to the Earl of Warwick, lived in Little Kineton in 1841.

== Military connections ==
During the Second World War, Kineton served as a transit camp, with Polish and Czechoslovak troops stationed there.

One of the UK's main military ammunition depots is located partially within Kineton parish, and is known as the Defence Storage and Distribution Agency (DSDA), Kineton. It extends to several hundred acres and is linked to the main Network Rail system by a branch line. The depot also stores spare railway carriages and trains on behalf of the various UK train operating companies.

Partially within Kineton parish, from 1942 until 1977, RAF Gaydon operated as both a training unit and a front-line bomber base. In 1978, the site passed into civilian ownership and today contains the British Motor Museum, the headquarters and factory of sports car manufacturer Aston Martin, and the Jaguar Land Rover Gaydon Centre.

== Present ==
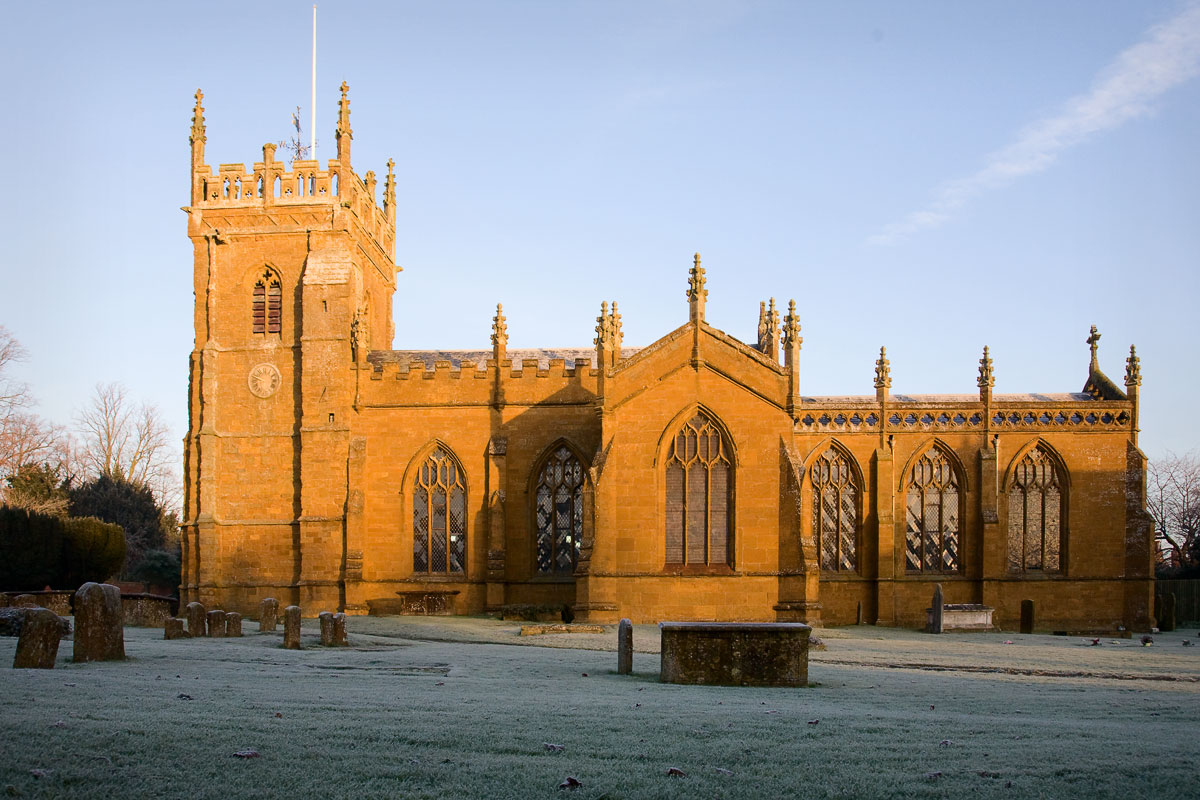
St Peter's Church, Kineton

Near the centre of the village stands St Peter's Church. Work on the current building, which replaced an earlier church on the same site, began in the 13th century. A completed church was consecrated in 1315. Of this new building only the fine tower remains.

The rest of the building has been rebuilt and remodelled over the centuries. In the 18th century Sanderson Miller enlarged the nave and added two transepts. A further remodelling campaign, which transformed the building into its current form, took place in the 19th century.

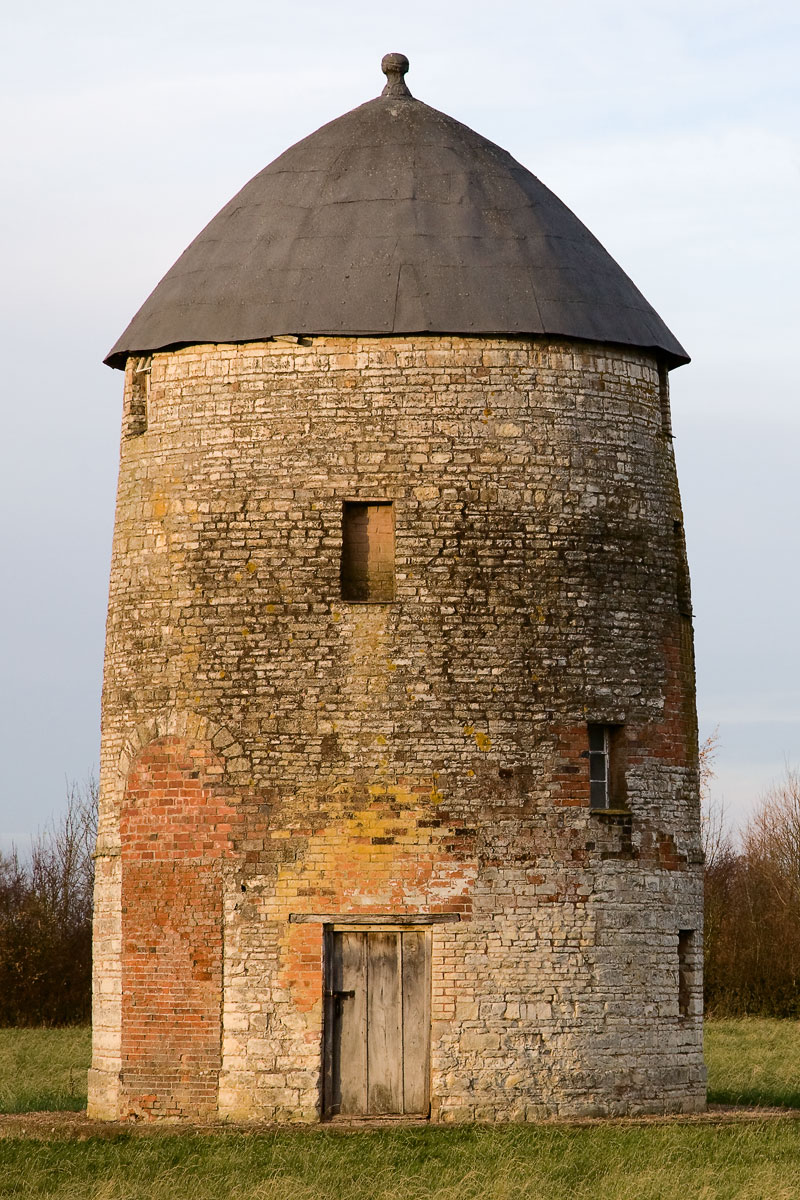
Pittern Hill Windmill

In 2008, three new bells were cast to augment the bells to eight, one replacing an existing bell. Taylors Eayre & Smith Ltd of Loughborough carried out the work. The eight bells were rung for the first time on 5 November 2008.

The village also has a 19th-century Methodist chapel and a 20th-century Roman Catholic church. Pittern Hill Mill, north-west of the village, is a stone windmill of the 18th century.

Village shops include a Co-op store, a traditional butcher, a flower shop, an optician, an artisan bakery, a barber, hairdresser as well as the Nifty Needle curtain and soft furnishings/fabrics shop and workroom. There is a post office/convenience store and had a branch of HSBC Bank now converted into a pharmacy (2017). The village has a veterinary practice, two estate agents, a café, a fish and chip shop, two public houses, The Swan, newly refurbished, and The Carpenters Arms (which has a Chinese take-away inside) and a restaurant, Shukur's Brasserie (which offers Bangladeshi and Indian cuisine).

The village and surrounding area are served by Kineton Church of England Primary School and Kineton High School, which takes students aged 11–19.

== Transport ==
Kineton is close to the Fosse Way Roman Road and the M40 motorway which links it to Birmingham and London.

Regular bus services to Stratford upon Avon, Banbury and Leamington Spa are operated by Stagecoach and other independent companies.

The village was once served by the Stratford-upon-Avon and Midland Junction Railway between Stratford-upon-Avon and Towcester. Kineton railway station opened on 1 June 1871 and was situated on the Broom to Fenny Compton line. The station closed in 1963 due to the Beeching Axe and the line itself closed two years later.

== Sports ==
Kineton Sports and Social Club hosts football, cricket and bowls teams. The football team competes in the Leamington & District Sunday Football League, affiliated to the Birmingham FA and the cricket side competes in the Cotswold Hills League. Kinetonbcycle are a group cycling from Little Kineton at 19:15 on Wednesday nights covering around 25 miles with on and off-road routes and including a pub stop. Kineton High School is the home of Wellesbourne Badminton Club who play in the Leamington and Banbury Leagues and have a club night every Tuesday from 7.30 pm, and South Warwickshire Junior Badminton Club who are a Badminton England Affiliated Club playing on a Friday night at 6.30 pm.

== Name connection ==
The town of Kyneton in Victoria, Australia was named after Kineton in the 19th century.

== See also ==
- Banburyshire
