= Walton, Warwickshire =

Hamlet in Warwickshire, England

Coordinates: 52.17902°N 1.58462°W

Walton
- Location within Warwickshire
- OS grid reference: SP285535
- Civil parish: Wellesbourne and Walton
- District: Stratford-on-Avon
- Shire county: Warwickshire
- Region: West Midlands
- Country: England
- Sovereign state: United Kingdom
- Post town: Warwick
- Postcode district: CV35

Walton or Walton d'Eiville is a small hamlet just south of Wellesbourne in the civil parish of Wellesbourne and Walton, in the Stratford-on-Avon District, in the county of Warwickshire, England. It is next to the River Dene and is most notable for Walton Hall which is now a hotel and spa. It is home to the Hamiltons who own the land and many of the villages houses. The village comprises 15 cottages, plus the old estate office, forge, school house, farm, and the old laundry. There has been some kind of settlement at Walton, on the little river Dene, between the Fosse Way and Wellesbourne, since the Iron Age times. The field to the south of the House, the site of the deserted village of Walton d 'Eivile, is still known as the Old Town.

The name "Walton" comes from settlement/farmstead of Wealas, native Celts, which is what the new Anglo Saxon speaking peoples called the native inhabitants of England. There is strong evidence that in many areas of England taken over by Germanic speaking settlers, the native British (Wealas) remained undisturbed, farming the same land they did when the Romans left. Over time they just adapted to the new conditions and forgot their Celtic tongue (similar to Old Welsh/Cornish) for the language and culture of the newcomers in order to climb the social ladder, or were coerced to do so. It was in the Anglo Saxon interest that the native British carry on as usual to ensure the economy produced food and goods for the new landowners.

== Notable people ==
- William Mordaunt Furneaux (1848–1928), Dean of Winchester 1903–1919, was born at the Parsonage.
