= Port Philip =

Port Philip may refer to:

- Port Philip, Nova Scotia

== See also ==
- Port Phillip
- Port Phillip (disambiguation)
