= Henrietta Maria of France =

Queen of England, Scotland and Ireland from 1625 to 1649

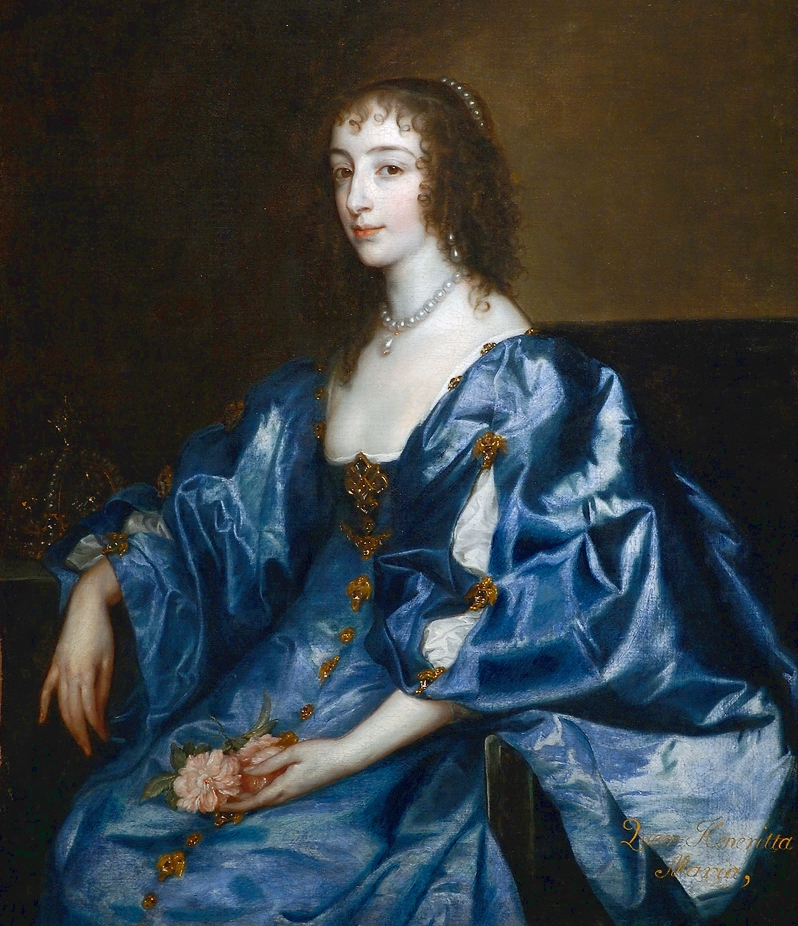
- Portrait, c. 1636–1638

Queen consort of England, Scotland, and Ireland
- Tenure: 13 June 1625 – 30 January 1649
- Born: 25 November 1609; Palais du Louvre, Paris, France
- Died: 10 September 1669 (aged 59); Château de Colombes, Colombes, France
- Burial: 13 September 1669; Basilica of Saint-Denis
- Spouse: Charles I, King of England (m. 1625; died 1649)
- Issue more...: Charles II, King of England; Mary, Princess Royal and Princess of Orange; James II & VII; Elizabeth; Anne; Henry, Duke of Gloucester; Henrietta, Duchess of Orléans
- House: Bourbon
- Father: Henry IV of France
- Mother: Marie de' Medici

Henrietta Maria of France (French: Henriette Marie; 25 November 1609 – 10 September 1669) was Queen of England, Scotland and Ireland from her marriage to King Charles I on 13 June 1625 until his execution on 30 January 1649. She was the mother of Charles II and James II and VII. Under a decree of her husband, she was known in England as Queen Mary, but she did not like this name and signed her letters "Henriette" or "Henriette Marie".

Henrietta Maria's Roman Catholicism made her unpopular in England, and also prohibited her from being crowned in a Church of England service; therefore, she never had a coronation. She immersed herself in national affairs as civil war loomed, and in 1644, following the birth of her youngest daughter, Henrietta, during the height of the First English Civil War, was compelled to seek refuge in France. The execution of Charles I in 1649 left her impoverished. She settled in Paris and returned to England in 1660 after the Restoration of Charles II to the throne. In 1665, she moved back to Paris, where she died four years later.

The North American Province of Maryland, a major haven for Roman Catholic settlers, was named in her honour. The name was carried over into the current U.S. state of Maryland.

== Early life and education ==
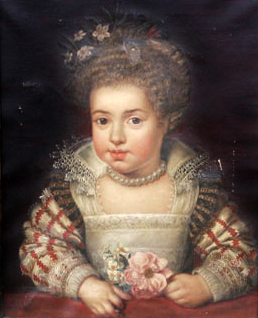
Henrietta Maria as a princess of France

Henrietta Maria was the youngest daughter of Henry IV of France (Henry III of Navarre) and his second wife, Marie de' Medici, and was named after her parents. She was born at the Palais du Louvre on 25 November 1609, but some historians give her a birthdate of 26 November. In England, where the Julian calendar was still in use, her date of birth is often recorded as 16 November. Henrietta Maria was brought up as a Roman Catholic. As a daughter of the Bourbon king of France, she was a Fille de France and a member of the House of Bourbon. She was the youngest sister of the future Louis XIII. Her father was assassinated on 14 May 1610, when she was less than a year old. As a child, she was raised under the supervision of the royal governess Françoise de Montglat.

Henrietta Maria was trained, along with her sisters, in riding, dancing, and singing, and took part in court plays. Although tutored in reading and writing, she was not known for her academic skills. As part of her religious training, the princess was heavily influenced by the Carmelites at the French court. By 1622, Henrietta Maria was living in Paris with a household of some 200 staff, and marriage plans were being discussed.

== Marriage negotiations ==
Henrietta Maria first met her future husband in 1623 at a court entertainment in Paris, when he was on his way to Spain with the Duke of Buckingham to discuss a possible marriage with Maria Anna of Spain. The proposal fell through when Philip IV of Spain demanded Charles convert to the Catholic Church and live in Spain for a year as pre-conditions for the marriage. As Philip was aware, such terms were unacceptable, and when Charles returned to England in October, he and Buckingham demanded King James declare war on Spain. Searching elsewhere for a bride, Charles sent his close friend Henry Rich, 1st Earl of Holland, to Paris in 1624. A Francophile and godson of Henry IV of France, Holland strongly favoured a marriage with Henrietta Maria, the terms of which were negotiated by James Hay, 1st Earl of Carlisle.

Henrietta Maria was aged fifteen at the time of her marriage, which was not unusual for royal princesses of the period. Opinions on her appearance vary; her husband's niece Sophia of Hanover commented that the

beautiful portraits of Van Dyck had given me such a fine idea of all the ladies of England that I was surprised to see that the queen, who I had seen as so beautiful and lean, was a woman well past her prime. Her arms were long and lean, her shoulders uneven, and some of her teeth were coming out of her mouth like tusks... She did, however, have pretty eyes, nose, and a good complexion..."

== Queenship ==
A proxy marriage was held at Notre-Dame de Paris on 1 May 1625, where Duke Claude of Chevreuse stood as proxy for Charles, shortly after Charles succeeded as king, with the couple spending their first night together at St Augustine's Abbey near Canterbury on 13 June 1625. As a Roman Catholic, Henrietta Maria was unable to participate in the Church of England ceremony on 2 February 1626 when Charles was crowned in Westminster Abbey. A suggestion she be crowned by Daniel de La Mothe-Houdancourt, the bishop of Mende who accompanied her to England, was unacceptable, although she was allowed to watch her husband's coronation at a discreet distance. This went down badly with the London crowds, while England's pro-French policy gave way rapidly to a policy of supporting French Huguenot uprisings, and then a disengagement from European politics, as internal problems grew.

After an initially difficult period, she and Charles formed a close partnership and were devoted to each other, but Henrietta Maria never fully assimilated into English society. She did not speak English before her marriage, and as late as the 1640s had difficulty writing or speaking the language. Combined with her Catholicism, this made her unpopular among English contemporaries who feared "Papist" subversion and conspiracies such as the Gunpowder Plot. Henrietta Maria has been criticised as being an "intrinsically apolitical, undereducated and frivolous" figure during the 1630s; others have suggested that she exercised a degree of personal power through a combination of her piety, her femininity, and her sponsorship of the arts.

=== Catholicism and household ===
Henrietta Maria, with her court dwarf, Jeffrey Hudson. A monkey is usually symbolic of an advisor to fools, such as court dwarves, but in this case is believed to represent Henrietta Maria's menagerie of pets; the orange tree represents her love of gardens. Painting by Anthony van Dyck

A devout Roman Catholic, (Note: Her favourite shrine was the Our Lady of Liesse.) her religion heavily influenced Henrietta Maria's time as queen, particularly the early years of her marriage. In July 1626, she caused huge controversy by stopping at Tyburn to pray for Catholics executed there and later tried to convert her Calvinist nephew Prince Rupert during his stay in England.

At first, there was uncertainty about the new Queen's name, and one historian has said of this "Henriette or Henrietta seeming altogether too fanciful for English taste". After prayers had been offered for her as "Queen Henry", the king determined the question by announcing that she was to be known publicly as "Queen Mary". He himself liked to call her "Maria". In using the name of Queen Mary, the English would also have been reminded of Charles's grandmother, Mary, Queen of Scots.

Henrietta Maria was open about her beliefs, obstructing plans to require the eldest sons of Catholic families to be raised as Protestants, and also facilitated Catholic marriages, a criminal offence under English law at the time.

An extension of this openness resulted in the Queen beginning to practise a sub-religion within her friend group, that being Précieuses. This was heavily inspired by the French's version of Devout Humanism, "whose proponents drew on the romance tradition in their writings in order to spread the influence of religion."

The new queen brought with her a huge quantity of expensive possessions, including jewellery, ornate clothes, 10,000 livres' worth of plate, chandeliers, pictures and books. She was also accompanied by a large and costly retinue, including her ladies-in-waiting, twelve Oratorian priests, and her pages. Charles blamed the poor start to his marriage on these advisors, primarily her principal confidante Madame St. George. He ordered their dismissal on 26 June 1626, greatly upsetting Henrietta Maria, while some refused to leave, including the Bishop of Mende who cited orders from the French king. In the end, they were physically ejected, but she managed to retain her chaplain and confessor, Robert Phillip, along with seven of her French staff, her nurse Françoise de Monbodiac, Madame Garnier, her dresser Marguerite Courtin, Madame de Vantelet, a cook, a baker, a pantler, and a tailor.

Their removal was part of a plan to control her extravagant expenditure, which resulted in debts that were still being paid off several years later. Charles appointed Jean Caille as her treasurer; he was succeeded by George Carew, then by Sir Richard Wynn in 1629. Despite these reforms and gifts from the king, her spending continued at a high level; in 1627, she was secretly borrowing money, and her accounts show large numbers of expensive dresses purchased during the pre-war years.

There were fears over her health, and in July 1627 she travelled with her physician Théodore de Mayerne to take the medicinal spring waters at Wellingborough in Northamptonshire, while Charles visited Castle Ashby House.

Over the next few years, the Queen's new household began to form around her. Henry Jermyn became her favourite and vice-chamberlain in 1628. The Countess of Denbigh became the Queen's Head of the Robes and confidante. She acquired several court dwarves, including Jeffrey Hudson and "little Sara". Henrietta Maria established her presence at Somerset House, Greenwich Palace, Oatlands, Nonsuch Palace, Richmond Palace and Holdenby as part of her jointure lands by 1630. She added Wimbledon House in 1639, which was bought for her as a present by Charles. She also acquired a menagerie of dogs, monkeys and caged birds.

=== Relationship with Charles ===
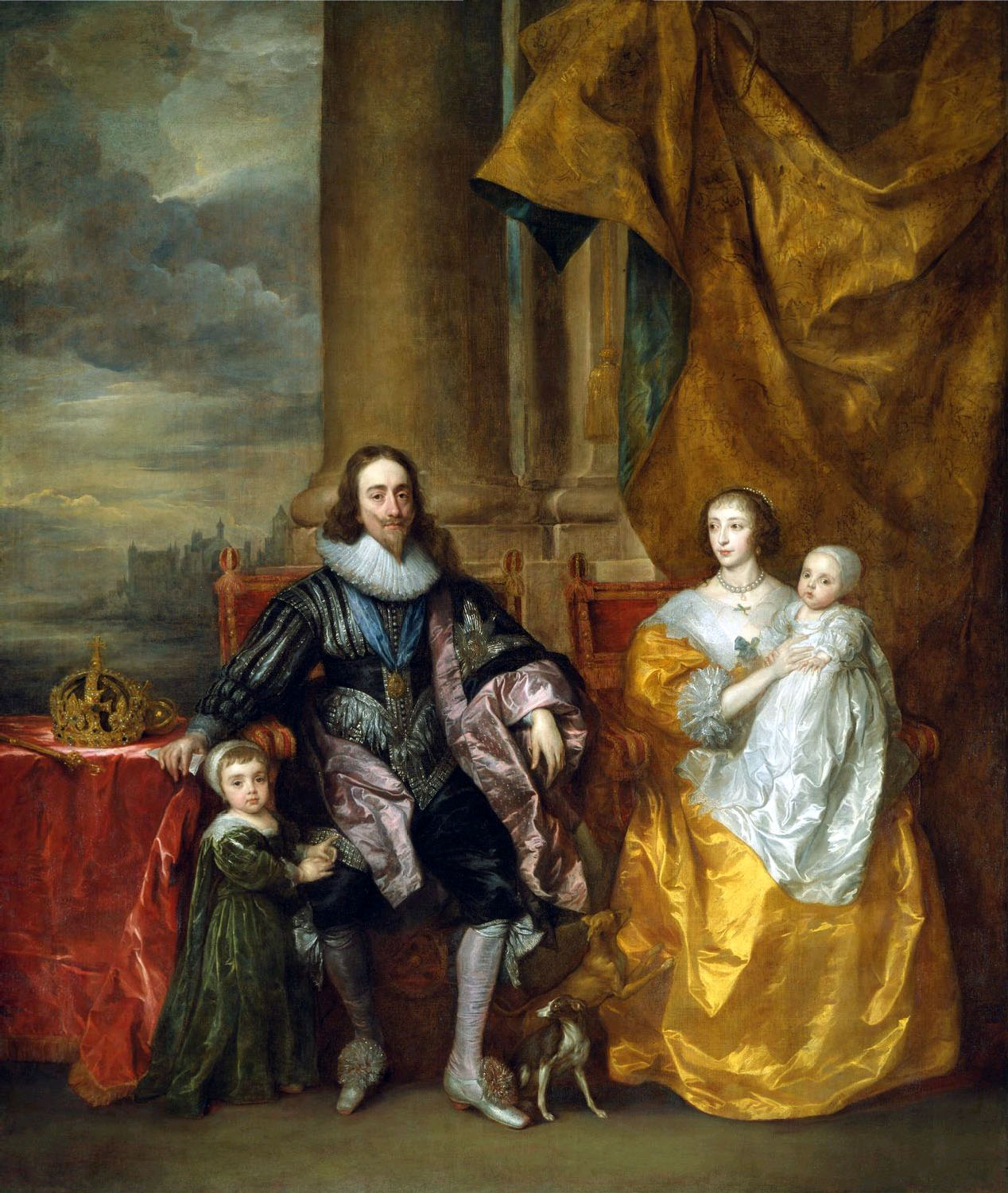
Henrietta Maria and King Charles I with Charles, Prince of Wales, and Princess Mary, painted by Anthony van Dyck, 1633. The greyhound symbolises the marital fidelity between Charles and Henrietta Maria.

Henrietta Maria's marriage to Charles did not begin well and was not improved by his ejection of her French staff. Initially, their relationship was frigid and argumentative, and Henrietta Maria took an immediate dislike to George Villiers, 1st Duke of Buckingham, the King's favourite.

One of Henrietta Maria's closest companions in the early days of her marriage was Lucy Hay, wife of James Hay who helped negotiate the marriage and who was now a gentleman of the bedchamber to Charles. Lucy was a staunch Protestant, a noted beauty and a strong personality. Many contemporaries believed her to be a mistress to Buckingham, rumours which Henrietta Maria would have been aware of, and it has been argued that Lucy was attempting to control the new queen on his behalf. Nonetheless, by the summer of 1628 the two were extremely close friends, with Hay one of the queen's ladies-in-waiting.

In August 1628, Buckingham was assassinated, leaving a gap in the royal court. Henrietta Maria's relationship with her husband promptly began to improve and the two forged deep bonds of love and affection, marked by various jokes played by Henrietta Maria on Charles. Henrietta Maria became pregnant for the first time in 1628 but lost her first child shortly after birth in 1629, following a very difficult labour. In 1630, however, following another complicated childbirth aided by the noted physician Theodore de Mayerne, the future Charles II was born. Henrietta Maria effectively took over Buckingham's role as Charles's closest friend and advisor. Despite the ejection of the French staff in 1626, Charles's court was heavily influenced by French society; French was usually used in preference to English, being considered a more polite language. Charles regularly wrote letters to Henrietta Maria, addressed "Dear Heart." These letters showcase the loving nature of their relationship. On 11 January 1645, for example, Charles wrote, "And dear Heart, thou canst not but be confident that there is no danger which I will not hazzard, or pains that I will not undergo, to enjoy the happiness of thy company."

Henrietta Maria, as her relationship with her husband grew stronger, split with Lucy Hay in 1634. The specific reasons are largely unclear although the two had had their differences before. Hay was an ardent Protestant, for example, and led a rather more dissolute life than the Queen; Henrietta Maria may also have felt rather overshadowed by the confident and beautiful Hay and because she now had such a close bond with her husband, such confidants were no longer as necessary.

=== Art patronage ===
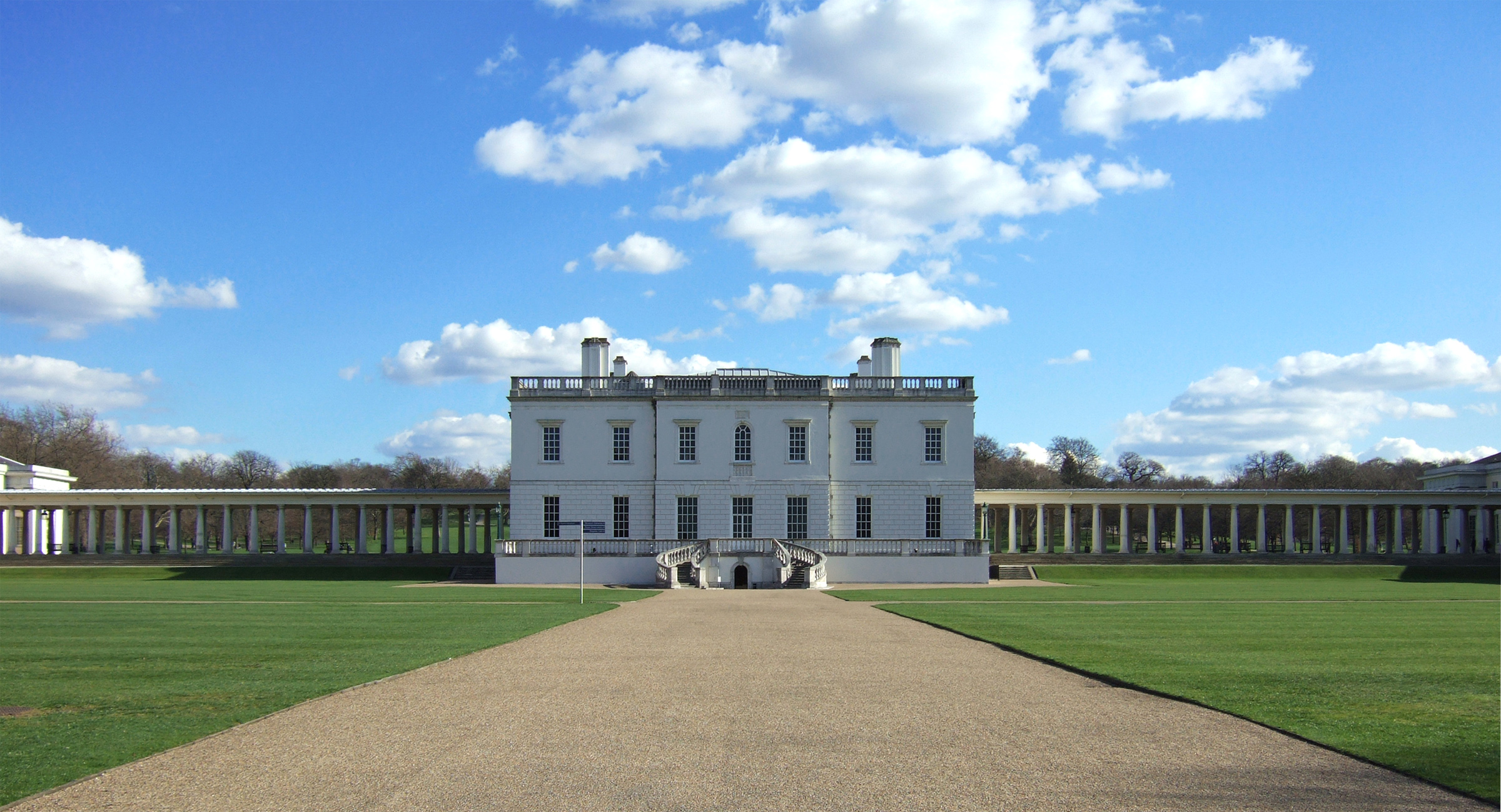
The Queen's House at Greenwich, completed under Henrietta Maria's sponsorship of Inigo Jones.

Henrietta Maria had a strong interest in the arts, and her patronage of various activities was one of the various ways in which she tried to shape court events. She and Charles were "dedicated and knowledgeable collectors" of paintings. Henrietta Maria was particularly known for her patronage of the Italian painter Orazio Gentileschi, who came to England in 1626 in the entourage of her favourite François de Bassompierre. Orazio and his daughter Artemisia Gentileschi were responsible for the huge ceiling paintings of the Queen's House at Greenwich. The Italian Guido Reni was another favourite artist, along with the miniature painters Jean Petitot and Jacques Bourdier. Anthony van Dyck was another very important painter she would often commission, either as gifts for others or for personal appreciation.

Henrietta Maria became a key patron in Stuart masques, complementing her husband's strong interest in paintings and the visual arts. She performed in various works herself, including as an Amazon in William Davenant's 1640 "Salmacida Spolia". She was also a patron of English composer Nicholas Lanier, and was responsible for Davenant being appointed the Poet Laureat in 1638.

The queen liked physical sculpture and design too, and retained the designer Inigo Jones as her surveyor of works during the 1630s. Like Charles, she was enthusiastic about garden design, although not horticulture itself, and employed André Mollet to create a baroque garden at Wimbledon House. She patronized Huguenot sculptor Hubert Le Sueur, while her private chapel was plain on the outside, but its interior included gold and silver reliquaries, paintings, statues, a chapel garden and a magnificent altarpiece by Rubens. It also had an unusual monstrance, designed by François Dieussart to exhibit the Holy Sacrament.

Henrietta Maria also had quite an interest in commercial theatre and, much like paintings and sculptures, was a prime patronage to many actors, their companies, and the theaters they performed in. A prime name in regard to her theatrical patronages is Christopher Beeston, who had not only run his own company of actors known by the Beeston's Boys, but others such as Queen Henrietta's Men. The latter group performed in many courts, such as Hampton Court or the Denmark House. These plays would often be to critical acclaim and great reception of the time, especially from other theatrical figures like Thomas Heywood. In the end – again, such as with other art forms – those who received Henrietta Maria's patronages were always appreciated, and in turn made certain to perform much appreciated shows.

== English Civil War ==
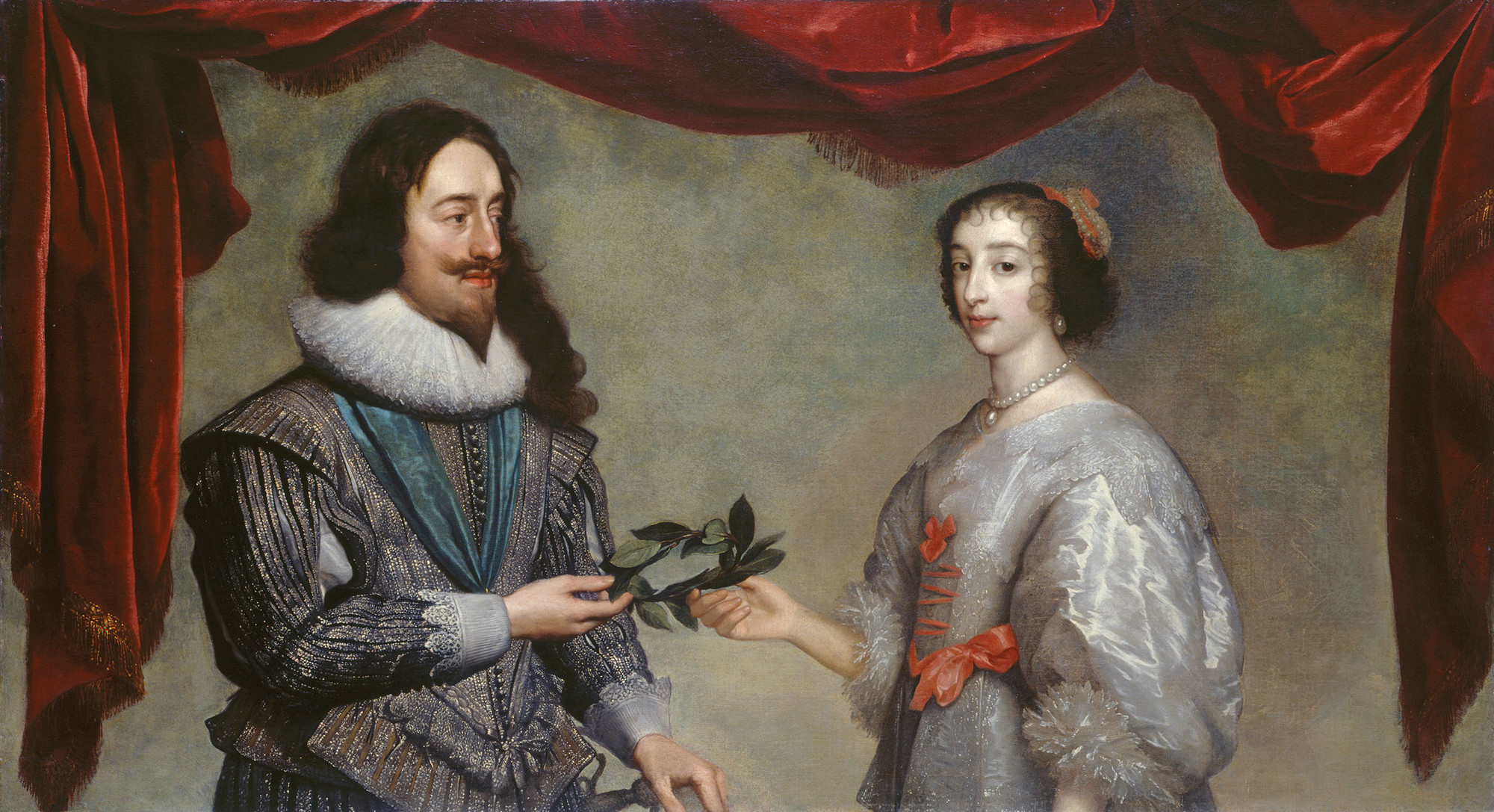
Charles handing a laurel wreath to Henrietta Maria, depicted in a 1631 portrait by Daniël Mijtens

During the 1640s, the kingdoms of England, Scotland and Ireland were dominated by a sequence of conflicts termed the English Civil War or the Wars of the Three Kingdoms; within England, the conflict centred on the rival Royalist and Parliamentarian factions. Queen Henrietta Maria became heavily involved in this conflict that resulted in her husband's death and her exile in France. There have been various schools of thought as to Henrietta Maria's role in the civil war period and the degree of her responsibility for the ultimate Royalist defeat. The traditional perspective on the Queen has suggested that she was a strong-willed woman who dominated her weaker-willed husband for the worse; the historian Wedgwood, for example, highlights Henrietta Maria's steadily increasing ascendancy over Charles, observing that "he sought her advice on every subject, except religion" and indeed complained that he could not make her an official member of his council. Some recounting from the 1670s back Wedgwood's case somewhat, as there is documentation of Henrietta Maria's rather forward trades with France for money and arms. Reinterpretation in the 1970s argued that Henrietta Maria's political role was more limited, suggesting that the King took more decisions himself personally. Quinton Bone concludes that, despite having a very close personal relationship with Henrietta Maria, Charles rarely listened to her on matters of state politics. A third, more recent model argues that Henrietta Maria did indeed exercise political power and influence during the conflict, less so directly but more as a result of her public actions and deeds, which constrained and influenced the choices available to Charles.

=== Pre-war years ===
By the end of the 1630s, relations between the English factions had become increasingly tense. Arguments over religion, society, morals, and political power became increasingly evident in the years before war broke out. Henrietta Maria's strong views on religion and social life at the court meant that, by 1642, she had become a "highly unpopular queen who apparently never successfully commanded intense personal respect and loyalty from most of her subjects".

Henrietta Maria remained sympathetic to her fellow Catholics, and in 1632 began construction of a new Catholic chapel at Somerset House. The old chapel had been deeply unpopular amongst Protestants, and there had been much talk amongst London apprentices of pulling it down as an anti-Catholic gesture. Although modest externally, Henrietta Maria's chapel was much more elaborate inside and was opened in a particularly grand ceremony in 1636. This caused great alarm amongst many in the Protestant community. Henrietta Maria's religious activities appear to have focused on bringing a modern, 17th-century European form of Catholicism to England. To some extent, it worked, with numerous conversions amongst Henrietta Maria's circle; historian Kevin Sharpe argues that there may have been up to 300,000 Catholics in England by the late 1630s – they were certainly more open in court society. Charles came under increasing criticism for his failure to act to stem the flow of high-profile conversions. Henrietta Maria even gave a requiem mass in her private chapel for Father Richard Blount, S.J., upon his death in 1638. She also continued to act in masque plays throughout the 1630s, which met with criticism from the more Puritan wing of English society. In most of these masques she chose roles designed to advance ecumenism, Catholicism and the cult of Platonic love.

The result was an increasing intolerance of Henrietta Maria in Protestant English society, gradually shifting towards hatred. In 1630, Alexander Leighton, a Scottish doctor, was flogged, branded and mutilated for criticising Henrietta Maria in a pamphlet, before being imprisoned for life. In the late 1630s, the lawyer William Prynne, popular in Puritan circles, also had his ears cut off for writing that women actresses were notorious whores, a clear insult to Henrietta Maria. London society would blame Henrietta Maria for the Irish Rebellion of 1641, believed to be orchestrated by the Jesuits to whom she was linked in the public imagination. Henrietta Maria herself was rarely seen in London, as Charles and she had largely withdrawn from public society during the 1630s, both because of their desire for privacy and because of the cost of court pageants.

By 1641, an alliance of Parliamentarians under John Pym had begun to place increasing pressure on Charles, himself embattled after the failure of several wars. The Parliamentary faction achieved the arrest and subsequent execution of the king's advisers, Archbishop William Laud and Thomas Wentworth, Earl of Strafford. Pym then turned his attention to Henrietta Maria as a way of placing further pressure on Charles. The Grand Remonstrance, passed by Parliament at the end of 1641, for example, did not mention the Queen by name, but it was clear to all that she was part of the Roman Catholic conspiracy the remonstrance referred to and condemned. Henrietta Maria's confidant Henry Jermyn, who had himself converted to Catholicism in the 1630s, was forced to flee to the Continent after the First Army Plot of 1641.

Henrietta Maria encouraged Charles to take a firm line with Pym and his colleagues. She was widely believed to have encouraged Charles to arrest his Parliamentary enemies in January 1642, although no hard proof of this exists. The Marquis de La Ferté-Imbault, the French ambassador, was keen to avoid any damage to French prestige by an attack on the Queen, but was equally unimpressed by Charles's record on relations with France. He advised caution and reconciliation with Pym. The arrest was bungled, and Pym and his colleagues escaped Charles's soldiers, possibly as a result of a tip-off from Henrietta Maria's former friend Lucy Hay. With the anti-royalist backlash now in full swing, Henrietta Maria and Charles retreated from Whitehall to Hampton Court.

The situation was steadily moving towards open war, and in February Henrietta Maria left for The Hague, both for her own safety and to attempt to defuse public tensions about her Catholicism and her closeness to the king. The Hague was the seat of Henrietta's prospective son-in-law, William II of Orange, and the queen was to accompany the bride, her 10-year-old daughter Mary, to her new home. Also, her widowed sister-in-law Elizabeth, mother of the queen's old favourite, Prince Rupert, had already been living in The Hague for some years. The Hague was a major centre for banking and finance; the queen intended to raise funds in aid of her husband there.

=== First English Civil War (1642–1646) ===
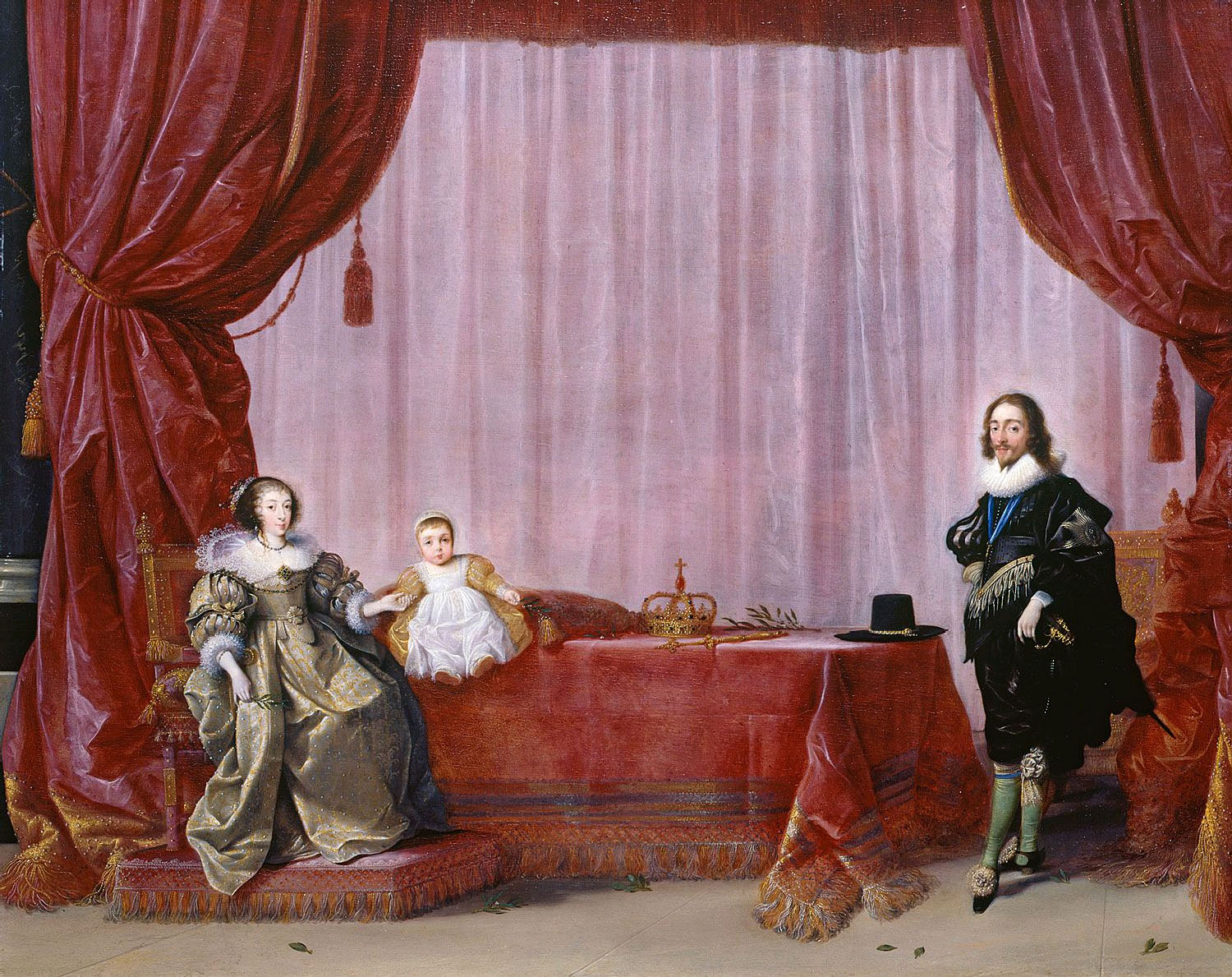
Henrietta Maria and Charles before the war, with their son Charles. The couple spent much of the war apart, corresponding by letter. Hendrik Gerritsz Pot, Royal Collection

In August 1642, when the Civil War finally began, Henrietta Maria was in Europe at The Hague, raising money for the Royalist cause. Henrietta Maria focused on raising money on the security of the royal jewels, and on attempting to persuade Prince Frederick Henry of Orange and King Christian IV of Denmark to support Charles's cause. Henrietta would regularly send letters to Charles from her time in The Hague to her eventual return to England. This was to maintain the couple's dual decision-making beyond simply keeping in touch. She was not well during this period, suffering from toothache, headaches, a cold, and coughs. Henrietta Maria's negotiations were difficult; the larger pieces of jewellery were both too expensive to be sold easily, and politically risky – many buyers were deterred in case a future English Parliament attempted to reclaim them, arguing they had been illegally sold by Henrietta Maria. Henrietta Maria was finally partially successful in her negotiations, particularly for the smaller pieces, but she was portrayed in the English press as selling off the crown jewels to foreigners to buy guns for a religious conflict, adding to her unpopularity at home. She urged Charles, then in York, to take firm action and secure the strategic port of Hull at the earliest opportunity, angrily responding to his delays in taking action.

At the beginning of 1643, Henrietta Maria attempted to return to England. Part of the rashness of the following decisions were partially due to the desire to rejoin Charles I in person, as his recent decision-making and disregard of her advising caused her to grow very concerned. The first attempt to cross from The Hague was not an easy one; battered by storms, her ship came close to sinking and was forced to return to port. However, several of her escort ships were damaged and one, the baggage ship of her household with many of her possessions, was sunk near Texel. Henrietta Maria used the delay to convince the Dutch to release a shipload of arms for the king, which had been held at the request of Parliament. Defying her astrologers, who predicted disaster, she set to sea again at the end of February. This second attempt was successful and she evaded the Parliamentarian navy to land at Bridlington in Yorkshire with troops and arms. The pursuing naval vessels then bombarded the town, forcing the royal party to take cover in neighbouring fields; Henrietta Maria returned under fire, however, to recover her pet dog Mitte which had been forgotten by her staff.

Henrietta Maria paused for a period at York, where she was entertained in some style by the Earl of Newcastle. She took the opportunity to discuss the situation north of the border with Royalist Scots, promoting the plans of Montrose and others for an uprising. She also supported the Earl of Antrim's proposals to settle the rebellion in Ireland and bring forces across the sea to support the king in England. Henrietta Maria continued to argue vigorously for nothing less than a total victory over Charles's enemies, countering proposals for a compromise. She rejected private messages from Pym and Hampden asking her to use her influence over the king to create a peace treaty, and was impeached by Parliament shortly afterwards. Meanwhile, Parliament had voted to destroy her private chapel at Somerset House and arrest the Capuchin friars who maintained it. In March, Henry Marten and John Clotworthy forced their way into the chapel with troops and destroyed the altarpiece by Rubens, smashed many of the statues and made a bonfire of the queen's religious canvases, books and vestments.

Travelling south in the summer, she met Charles at Kineton, near Edgehill, before travelling on to the royal capital in Oxford. The journey through the contested Midlands was not an easy one, and Prince Rupert was sent to Stratford-upon-Avon to escort her. Despite the difficulties of the journey, Henrietta Maria greatly enjoyed herself, eating in the open air with her soldiers and meeting friends along the way. She arrived in Oxford bringing fresh supplies to great acclaim; poems were written in her honour, and Jermyn, her chamberlain, was given a peerage by the king at her request.

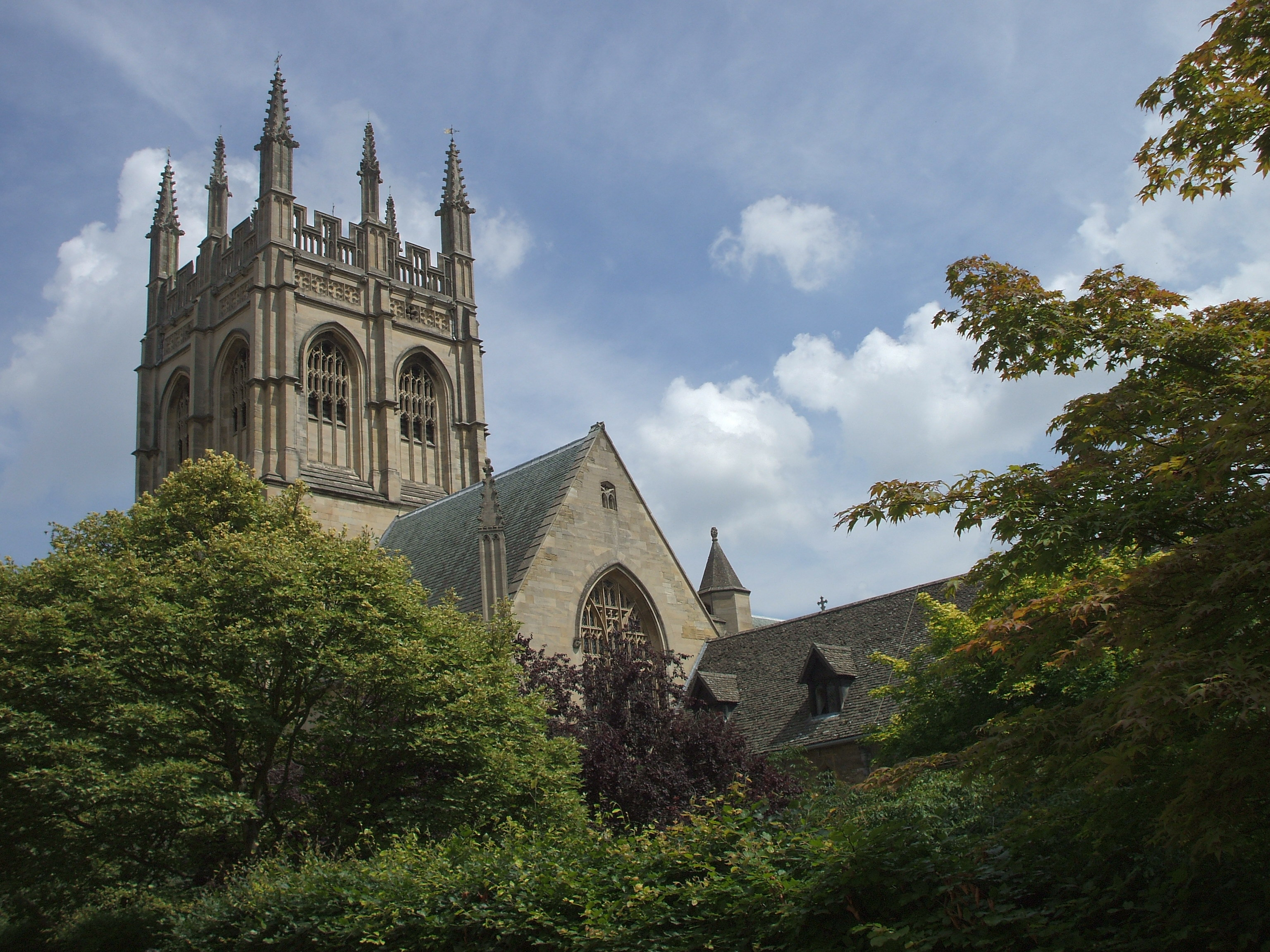
Merton College chapel, which became Henrietta Maria's private chapel while she was based in Oxford during the Civil War.

Henrietta Maria spent the autumn and winter of 1643 in Oxford with Charles, where she attempted, as best she could, to maintain the pleasant court life that they had enjoyed before the war. The queen lived in the Warden's lodgings in Merton College, adorned with the royal furniture which had been brought up from London. The queen's usual companions were present: Denbigh, Davenant, her dwarves; her rooms were overrun by dogs, including Mitte. The atmosphere in Oxford was a combination of a fortified city and a royal court, and Henrietta Maria was frequently stressed with worry.

By early 1644, however, the king's military situation had started to deteriorate. Royalist forces in the north came under pressure, and after the Royalist defeat at the battle of Alresford in March, the royal capital at Oxford was less secure. The queen was pregnant with Henrietta and the decision was taken for her to withdraw safely west to Bath. Charles travelled as far as Abingdon with her before returning to Oxford with his sons. It was the last time the two saw each other.

Henrietta Maria eventually continued southwest beyond Bath to Exeter, where she stopped, awaiting her imminent labour. Meanwhile, however, the Parliamentarian generals the Earl of Essex and William Waller had produced a plan to exploit the situation. Waller would pursue and hold down the king and his forces, while Essex would strike south to Exeter with the aim of capturing Henrietta Maria and thereby acquiring a valuable bargaining counter over Charles. By June, Essex's forces had reached Exeter. Henrietta Maria had had another difficult childbirth, and the king had to personally appeal to their usual physician, de Mayerne, to risk leaving London to attend to her. The Queen was in considerable pain and distress, but decided that the threat from Essex was too great; leaving newborn Henrietta in Exeter because of the risks of the journey, she stayed at Pendennis Castle, then took to sea from Falmouth in a Dutch vessel for France on 14 July. Despite coming under fire from a Parliamentarian ship, she instructed her captain to sail on, reaching Brest in France and the protection of her French family.

By the end of the year, Charles's position was getting weaker and he desperately needed Henrietta Maria to raise additional funds and troops from the continent. The campaigns of 1645 went poorly for the Royalists, however, and the capture, and subsequent publishing, of the correspondence between Henrietta Maria and Charles in 1645 following the Battle of Naseby proved hugely damaging to the royal cause. In two decisive engagements – the Battle of Naseby in June and the Battle of Langport in July – the Parliamentarians effectively destroyed Charles's armies. Finally, in May 1646 Charles sought shelter with a Presbyterian Scottish army at Southwell in Nottinghamshire.

=== Second and Third English Civil Wars (1648–1651) ===
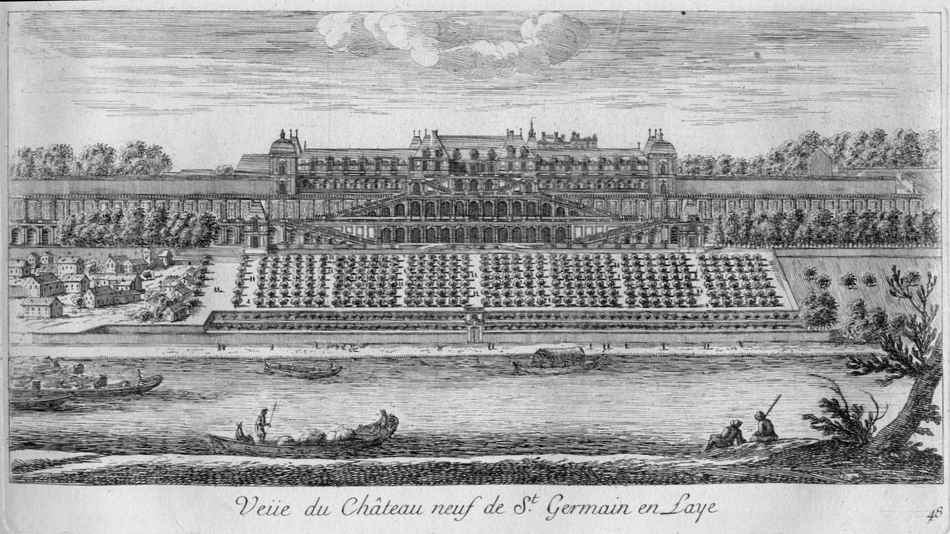
Henrietta Maria's court in exile was based at St-Germain-en-Laye, shown here c. 1660 in an etching by Israel Silvestre.

With the support of Anne of Austria and the French government, Henrietta Maria settled in Paris, appointing as her chancellor, the eccentric Sir Kenelm Digby, and forming a Royalist court in exile at the Chateau-Neuf de Saint-Germain-en-Laye. (Note: In these times there were two royal castles at Saint-Germain-en-Laye: The old (Château-Vieux) and the new).) During 1646 there was talk of Prince Charles joining Henrietta Maria in Paris; Henrietta Maria and the King were keen, but the Prince was initially advised not to go, as it would portray him as a Catholic friend of France. After the continued failure of the Royalist efforts in England, he finally agreed to join his mother in July 1646.

Henrietta Maria was increasingly depressed and anxious in France, from where she attempted to convince Charles to accept a Presbyterian government in England as a means of mobilising Scottish support for the re-invasion of England and the defeat of Parliament. In December 1647, she was horrified when Charles rejected the "Four Bills" offered to him by Parliament as a peace settlement. Charles had secretly signed "The Engagement" with the Scots, however, promising a Presbyterian government in England with the exception of Charles's own household. The result was the Second Civil War, which despite Henrietta Maria's efforts to send it some limited military aid, ended in 1648 with the defeat of the Scots and Charles's capture by Parliamentary forces.

In France, meanwhile, a "hothouse" atmosphere had developed amongst the royal court in exile at the Château de Saint-Germain-en-Laye. Henrietta Maria had been joined by a wide collection of Royalist exiles, including Jermyn, Henry Wilmot, Lord John Byron, George Digby, Henry Percy, John Colepeper and Charles Gerard, who were referred to collectively as the 'Louvre faction'. The Queen's court was beset with factionalism, rivalry and duelling; Henrietta Maria had to prevent Prince Rupert from fighting a duel with Digby, arresting them both, however, she was unable to prevent a later duel between Digby and Percy, and between Rupert and Percy shortly after that.

King Charles was executed by decree of Parliament in 1649; his death left Henrietta Maria almost destitute and in shock, a situation not helped by the French civil war of the Fronde, which left Henrietta Maria's nephew King Louis XIV short of money himself. During the ensuing, and final, Third English Civil War the whole of the Royalist circle now based itself from St-Germain, with Henrietta Maria's followers being joined by the old Royalist circle who had been with her son Charles II at the Hague, including Ormonde and Inchiquin and Clarendon, whom she particularly disliked. She also quarrelled with Ormonde: when she said that if she had been trusted the King would be in England, Ormonde, with his usual bluntness, retorted that if she had never been trusted the King need never have left England. Co-location began to bring the factions together, but Henrietta Maria's influence was waning. In 1654, Charles II moved his court on to Cologne, eliminating the remaining influence of Henrietta Maria in St-Germain.

Henrietta Maria increasingly focused on her faith and on her children, especially Henrietta (whom she called "Minette"), James and Henry. Henrietta Maria attempted to convert both James and Henry to Catholicism, her attempts with Henry angering both Royalists in exile and Charles II. Henriette, however, was brought up a Catholic. Henrietta Maria had founded a convent at Chaillot in 1651, and she lived there for much of the 1650s.

== Restoration ==
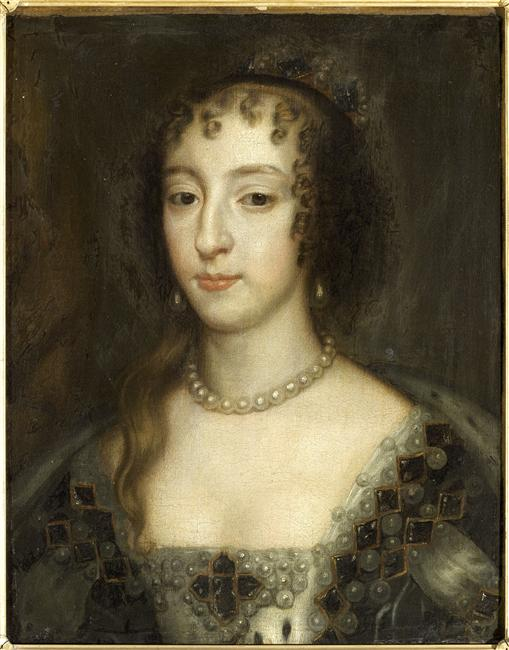
Henrietta Maria painted by Sir Peter Lely after the restoration of her son Charles II to the throne

Henrietta Maria returned to England following the Restoration in October 1660 along with her daughter Henrietta. She did not return to much public acclaim – Samuel Pepys counted only three small bonfires lit in her honour, and described her as a "very little plain old woman [then aged 50], and nothing more in her presence in any respect nor garb than any ordinary woman". She took up residence once more at Somerset House, supported by a generous pension.

Henrietta Maria's return was partially prompted by a liaison between her second son, James, Duke of York, and Anne Hyde, the daughter of Edward Hyde, Charles II's chief minister. Anne was pregnant, and James had proposed marrying her. Henrietta Maria was horrified; she still disliked Edward Hyde, did not approve of the pregnant Anne, and certainly did not want the courtier's daughter to marry her son. However, Charles II agreed and despite her efforts the couple were married.

That same September, Henrietta's third son, Henry Stuart, Duke of Gloucester, died of smallpox in London at age 20. He had accompanied his brother King Charles II to England in May and had participated in the King's triumphal progress through London. More death was to follow: on Christmas Eve, Henrietta's elder daughter Mary also died of smallpox in London, leaving behind a 10-year-old son, the future William III of England.

In 1661, Henrietta Maria returned to France and arranged for her youngest daughter, Henrietta, (Note: Named after the French Queen Anne of Austria) to marry her first cousin, Philippe I, Duke of Orléans, the only brother of Louis XIV. This significantly helped English relations with the French.

After her daughter's wedding, Henrietta Maria returned to England in 1662 accompanied by her son Charles II and her nephew Prince Rupert. She had intended to remain in England for the rest of her life, but by 1665 was suffering badly from bronchitis, which she blamed on the damp British weather. Henrietta Maria travelled back to France the same year, taking residence at the Hôtel de la Bazinière (now the Hôtel de Chimay) in Paris. Her nephew Louis XIV, who loved and esteemed his aunt, visited her several times and consulted her on everything that concerned the affairs of France. (Note: The château de Colombes was demolished in 1846) In August 1669, she saw the birth of her granddaughter Anne Marie d'Orléans; Anne Marie was the maternal grandmother of Louis XV, making Henrietta Maria an ancestor of most of today's European royal families. Shortly afterwards, she died at the Château de Colombes, near Paris, having taken an excessive quantity of opiates as a painkiller on the advice of Louis XIV's doctor, Antoine Vallot, for having a serious lung infection at the time. She was buried in the French royal necropolis at the Basilica of Saint-Denis, with her heart being placed in a silver casket and buried at her convent in Chaillot.

== Legacy ==
During his 1631 Northwest Passage expedition in the ship Henrietta Maria, Captain Thomas James named the northwest headland of James Bay where it opens into Hudson Bay for her. The U.S. state of Maryland was named in her honour by her husband, Charles I. George Calvert, 1st Baron Baltimore submitted a draft charter for the colony with the name left blank, suggesting that Charles bestow a name in his own honour. Charles, having already honoured himself and several family members in other colonial names, decided to honour his wife. The specific name given in the charter was "Terra Mariae, anglice, Maryland". The English name was preferred over the Latin due in part to the undesired association of "Mariae" with the Spanish Jesuit Juan de Mariana.

Numerous recipes ascribed to Henrietta Maria are reproduced in Kenelm Digby's famous cookbook The Closet of the Eminently Learned Sir Kenelme Digbie Kt. Opened.

A silk and wool mix cloth made in 1660, named in honour of the queen (Henrietta Maria).

She was portrayed by Dorothy Tutin in the movie Cromwell (1970).

== Arms ==
The coat of arms of Henrietta Maria of France as Queen of England.

The royal coat of arms of England, Scotland and Ireland was impaled with her father's arms as King of France and Navarre. The arms of Henry IV were: Azure, three fleurs de lys Or (France); impaling Gules, a cross a saltire and an orle of chains linked at the fess point with an amulet vert (Navarre). For her supporters she used the crowned lion of England on the dexter side, and on the sinister used one of the angels which had for some time accompanied the royal arms of France.

== Genealogical table ==
Henrietta Maria's relationship to the houses of Stuart and Bourbon

James I of England; 1566–1625	Anne of Denmark; 1574–1619	Henry IV of France; 1553–1610	Marie de' Medici; 1575–1642
Elizabeth; 1596–1662	Charles I of England; 1600–1649	Henrietta Maria; 1609–1669	Louis XIII of France; 1601–1643
Rupert of the Rhine; 1619–1682	Sophia of Hanover; 1630–1714	Charles II of England; 1630–1685	William II of Orange; 1626–1650	Mary; 1631–1660	Anne Hyde; 1637–1671	James II of England; 1633–1701	Mary of Modena; 1658–1718	Henrietta; 1644–1670	Philippe I, Duke of Orléans; 1640–1701	Louis XIV of France; 1638–1715
George I of Great Britain; 1660–1727	William III of England; 1650–1702	Mary II of England; 1662–1694	Anne of Great Britain; 1665–1714	James Francis Edward Stuart; 1688–1766	Marie Louise of Orléans; 1662–1689	Anne Marie of Orléans; 1669–1728

== Issue ==
Name	Birth	Death	Notes
Charles James, Duke of Cornwall	13 March 1629	13 March 1629	Stillborn
Charles II	29 May 1630	6 February 1685	Married Catherine of Braganza (1638–1705) in 1662. No legitimate issue.
Mary, Princess Royal	4 November 1631	24 December 1660	Married William II, Prince of Orange (1626–1650) in 1641. Had issue.
James II & VII	14 October 1633	16 September 1701	Married (1) Anne Hyde (1637–1671) in 1659; had issue (2) Mary of Modena (1658–1718) in 1673; had issue
Elizabeth	28 December 1635	8 September 1650	Died young; no issue. Buried Newport, Isle of Wight
Anne	17 March 1637	8 December 1640	Died young; no issue. Buried Westminster Abbey
Catherine	29 January 1639	29 January 1639	Died less than half an hour after baptism; buried Westminster Abbey.
Henry, Duke of Gloucester	8 July 1640	18 September 1660	Died unmarried; no issue. Buried Westminster Abbey
Henrietta	16 June 1644	30 June 1670	Married Philippe of France, Duke of Orléans (1640–1701) in 1661; had issue

Henrietta Maria of France House of Bourbon Cadet branch of the Capetian dynasty Born: 25 November 1609 Died: 10 September 1669
British royalty
Vacant Title last held by Anne of Denmark	Queen consort of England, Scotland and Ireland; 1625–1649	Vacant Title next held by Catherine of Braganza
