= Port Phillip (disambiguation) =

Port Phillip is a large bay in southern Victoria, Australia. It is named after British colonial administrator Arthur Phillip and adjoins the city of Melbourne.

It may also locally refer to

- City of Port Phillip, local government area in Melbourne
- Port Phillip Association, company formed in June 1835 to settle land in what would become Melbourne
- Port Phillip Bay (Western Shoreline) and Bellarine Peninsula Ramsar Site
- Port Phillip Channel Deepening Project
- Port Phillip District, historical administrative division of the Colony of New South Wales, later to become the core of the state of Victoria
- Port Phillip District Special Surveys, part of land settlement legislation in 1841
- Port Phillip Gazette, Melbourne newspaper 1838-1851
- Port Phillip Heads Marine National Park
- Port Phillip Herald, Melbourne newspaper est. 1840
- Port Phillip Prison, Truganina, Victoria
- Port Phillip Protectorate, 1839 attempt to protect Aborigines
- Port Phillip Arcade, a shopping arcade in the city of Melbourne

== See also ==
- Port Philip, Nova Scotia
