= Chedham's Yard =

Coordinates: 52.1955°N 1.5912°W

Chedham's Yard, Wellesbourne

Chedham's Yard is a collection of workshops, garden and visitor centre located in Wellesbourne, Warwickshire, England. The site was the winner of the BBC Restoration Village competition in 2006.

Planning permission was granted in November 2009 for the yard to become a visitor and education centre.

The yard opened to the public on 16 June 2012.
