= Castle of Colombes =

Residence of Henrietta Maria of France

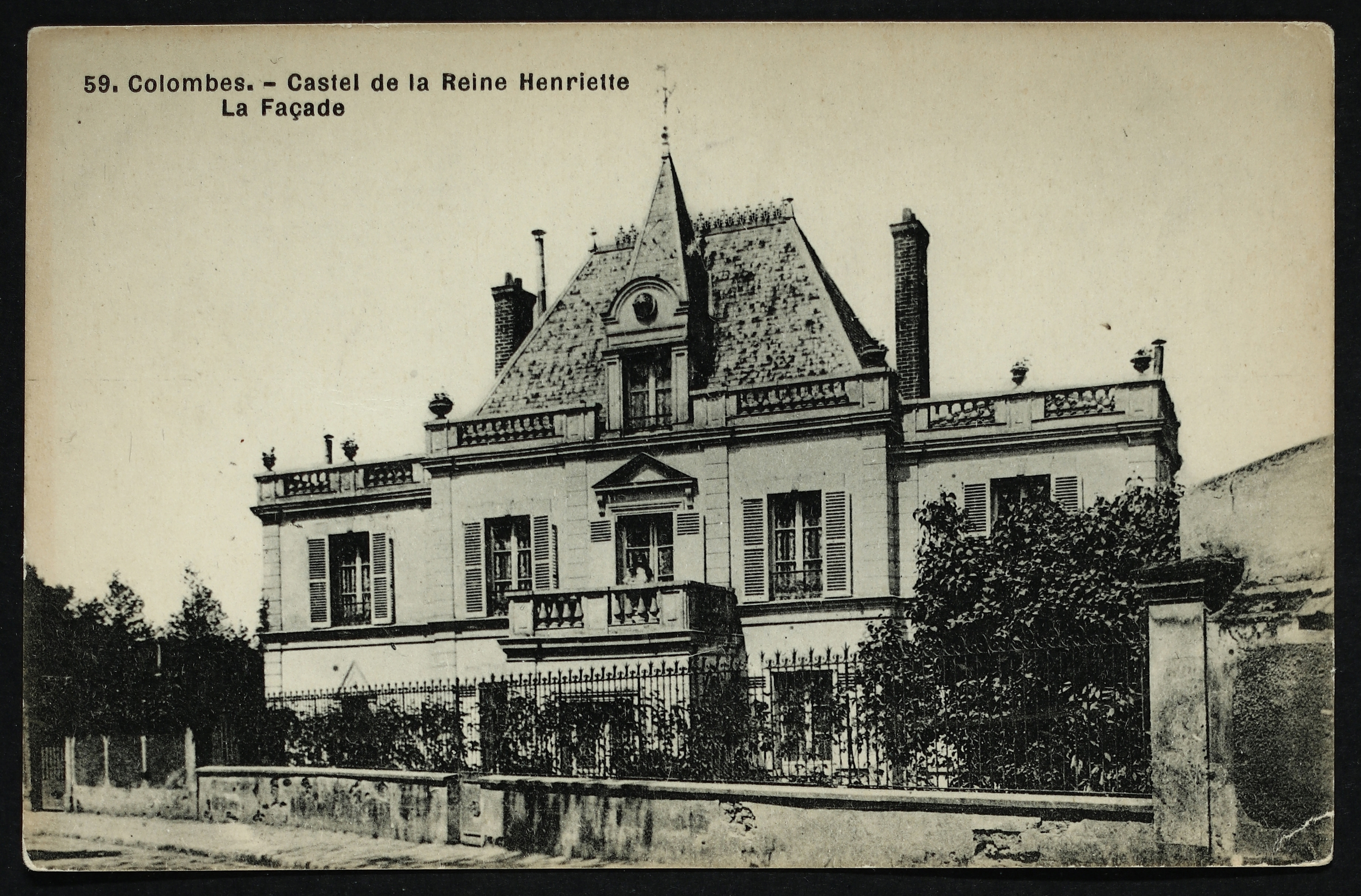
The facade of the château in a 19th century photograph.

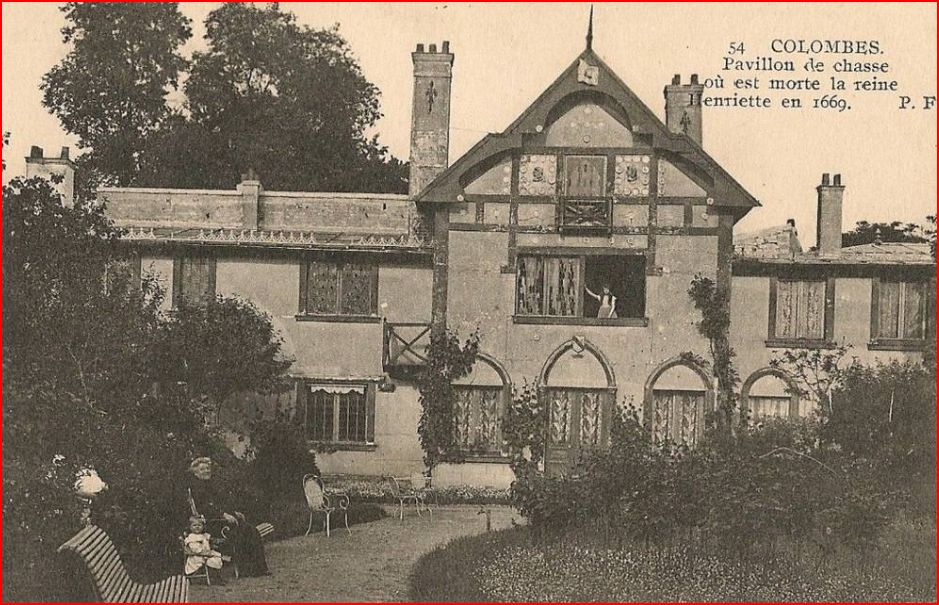
Hunting lodge where Queen Henrietta Maria died in 1669.

Castle of Colombes was the residence of Queen Henrietta Maria, wife of King Charles I of England, in her exile in France. It was demolished in 1846.

== History ==
Located in the city of the same name, the castle was surrounded by a three-hectare garden. According to historical records, its first owner was a Mr. Barbot, in 1636.

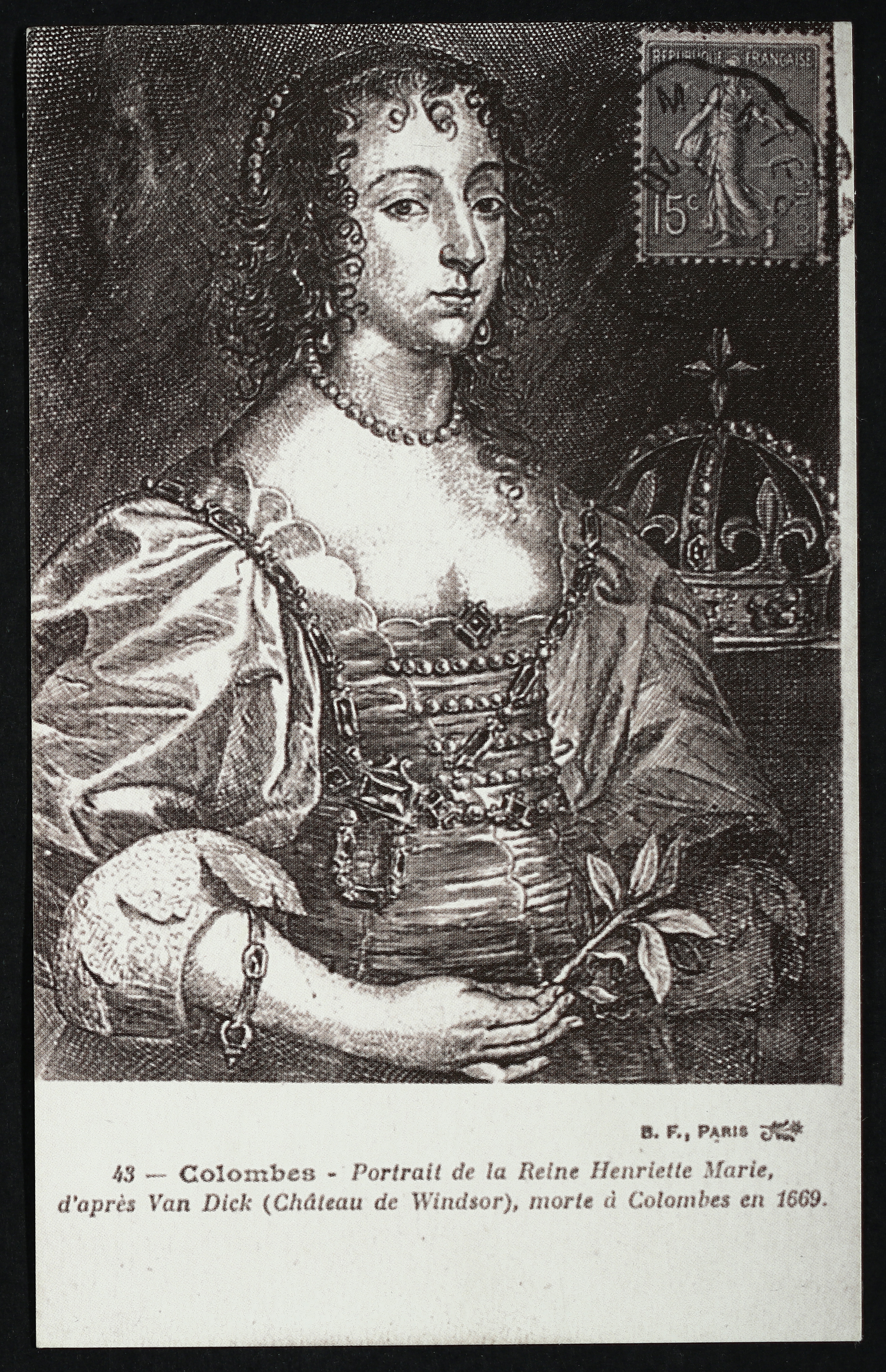
Postcard from Colombes from the 19th century in honor of Queen Henriqueta Maria.

In 1657, Queen Henrietta Maria of England settled in Colombes, after being expelled from England in 1644, following the English Civil War. King Louis XIV and his wife Maria Theresa visited in June 1665. Negotiations for the Treaty of Breda (1667), between Holland and England, took place in Colombes.

Henrietta Maria's granddaughters, the future queens Maria Luisa of Spain and Anne of Great Britain, spent much of their childhood with their grandmother in Colombes.

After the death of Queen Henrietta Marie in 1669, Colombes was inherited by her daughter, Henrietta Anne, Duchess of Orleans, who died in 1670. The castle remained in the possession of the duchess's husband, Philippe I, Duke of Orléans, until it was sold by the Duke in 1698. The deed of sale describes Colombes as having several main buildings, a courtyard, a garden, etc.

In the 19th century, Colombes was renamed Château Reine Henriette. It was demolished in 1846 to make way for a kindergarten.

== Sources ==
- Curtis, Gila (1972), The Life and Times of Queen Anne, introduced by Antonia Fraser, London: Weidenfeld & Nicolson, ISBN 0-2979-9571-5, OL 5457893M
- Green, David (1970), Queen Anne, London: Collins, ISBN 0-0021-1693-6
- Gregg, Edward (2001), Queen Anne (2nd ed.), New Haven: Yale University Press, ISBN 0-3000-9024-2, OL 3958275M
- Waller, Maureen (2007), Sovereign Ladies: The Six Reigning Queens of England, London: John Murray, ISBN 0-7195-6628-2, OL 24198415M
