= Phillip Chancellor =

Phillip Chancellor may refer to the following fictional characters from The Young and the Restless:

- Phillip Chancellor II
- Phillip Chancellor III
- Phillip Chancellor IV

== See also ==
- Philip the Chancellor
