= Glossary of mill machinery =

Diagram showing an underdrift windmill

This glossary of mill machinery covers the major pieces of machinery to be found in windmills, watermills and horse mills. It does not cover machinery found in modern factories.

== Watermill machinery ==
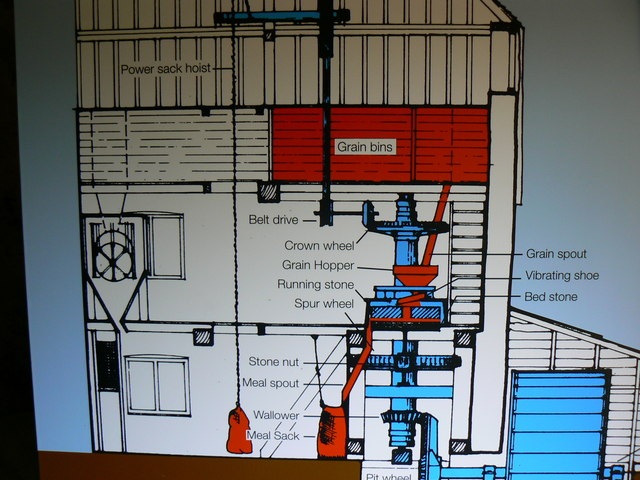
Machinery in a watermill

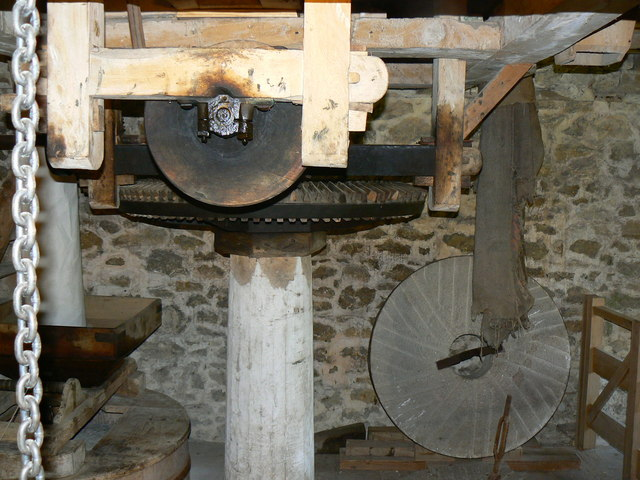
Crown Wheel and Upright Shaft

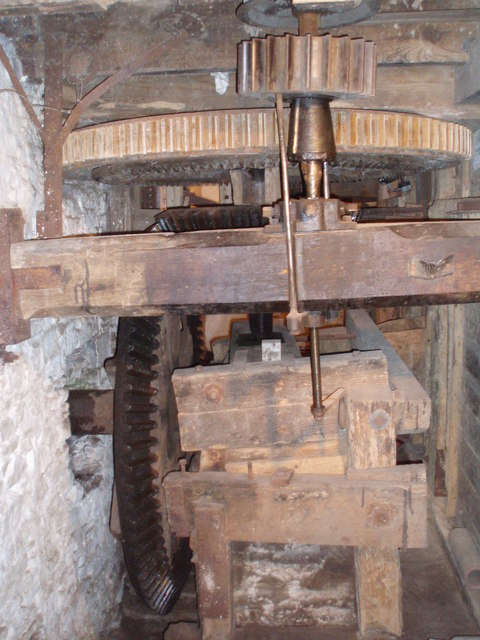
Pit Wheel, Great Spur Wheel, Stone Nut (Underdrift stones)

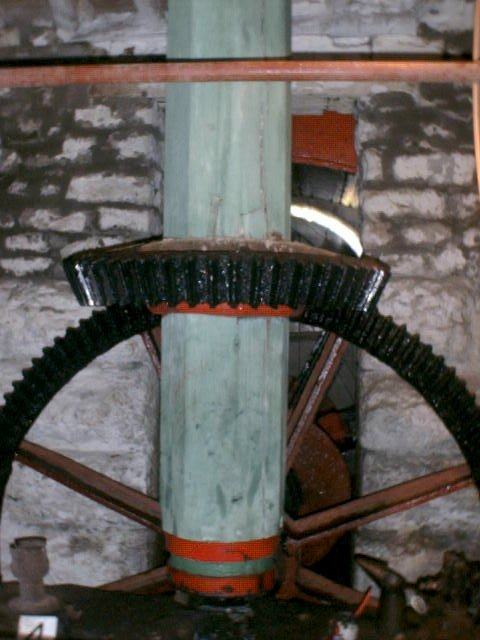
Pit Wheel, Wallower and Upright Shaft.

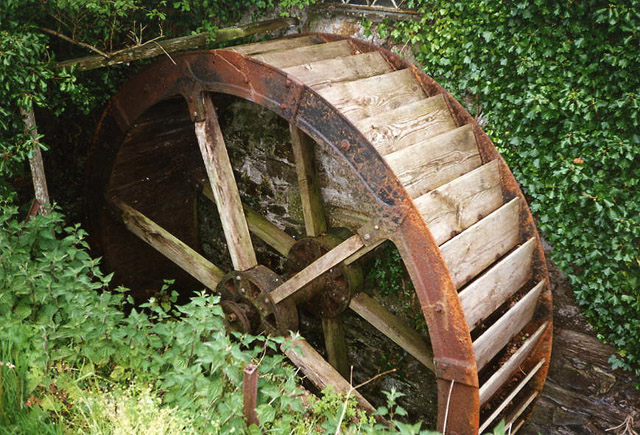
A Waterwheel

Axle
The axle carries the waterwheel. It can also carry the Pit Wheel at its opposite end.

Bedstone
The Bedstone is the bottom of a pair of millstones. It does not move. The upper stone is called the Runner Stone.

Crown Wheel
The Crown Wheel is a driving wheel located at the top of the Upright Shaft

Great Spur Wheel
The Great Spur Wheel is a large gear attached to the Upright Shaft. It drives one or more Stone Nuts in a corn mill. If mounted on a Layshaft it is called a Spur Wheel and only drives one Stone Nut

Hurst Frame
An internal framework supporting the gears and millstones. This isolation prevents damage to the building from the vibrations of the workings.

Layshaft
A Layshaft in a watermill is a horizontal shaft, carrying a Wallower and one or more Spur Wheels. The term can also refer to a minor shaft driving machinery by pulleys and belts.

Overdrift
Millstones driven from above are known as Overdrift stones.

Pit Wheel
The Pit Wheel is mounted on the opposite end of the axle to the waterwheel. It drives the Wallower on the Upright Shaft or Layshaft.

Rim Drive
Some waterwheels have a rack attached to the circumference, which drives the mill via a pinion mounted on a separate axle, which has a Pit Wheel at its opposite end. This is known as Rim Drive.

Runner Stone
The Runner Stone is the topmost of a pair of millstones. It is driven by the Stone Nut. The lower stone is called a Bedstone.

Stone Nut
A Stone Nut is a small gear driven by the Great Spur Wheel or Spur Wheel. It drives the Runner Stone. In most watermills, the stones are driven from below. These are called Underdrift stones. A few watermills drove the stones from above, known as Overdrift stones.
Tentering gear
The mechanism by which the gap between the upper and lower stones is adjusted. It may by controlled by the miller, or automatically.
Turbine
In some watermills, a Turbine was used as a source of power instead of a Waterwheel. In many cases, the Turbine was installed when a watermill was modernised, although a few mills were built new with Turbines.

Underdrift
Millstones driven from beneath are known as Underdrift stones.

Upright Shaft
The Upright Shaft in the main driven shaft in a watermill. It carries the wallower, Great Spur Wheel and sometimes a Crown Wheel.

Wallower
The Wallower is a small gear at the base of the upright shaft in a watermill, it is driven by the Pit Wheel.

Waterwheel
A waterwheel is a source of power for a watermill. It is mounted on the axle and drives the mill by a Pit Wheel or Rim Drive. In some watermills, the Waterwheel was replaced by a Turbine.

== Windmill machinery ==
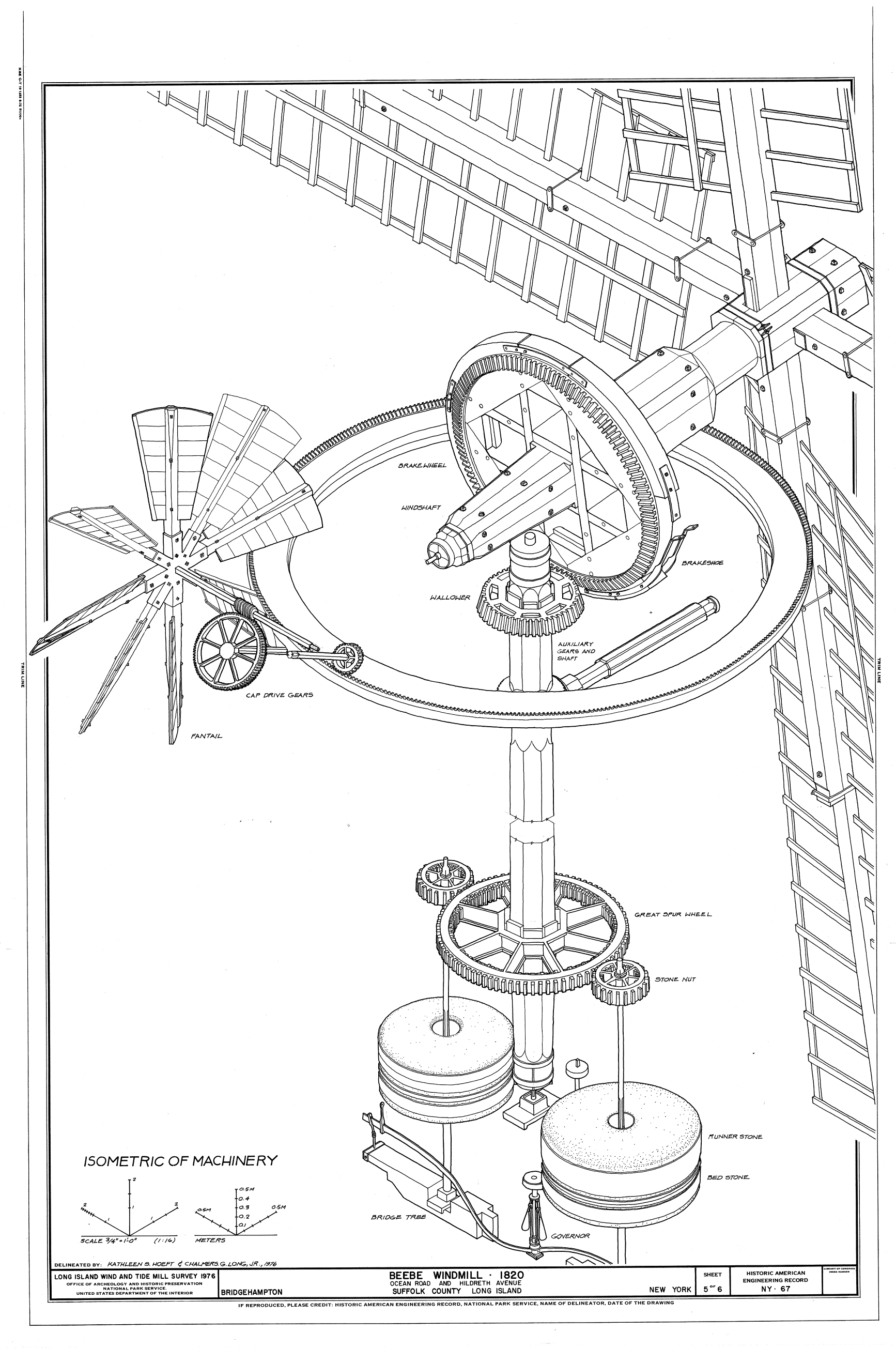
Machinery in an Overdrift windmill, note the Fantail and Common Sails

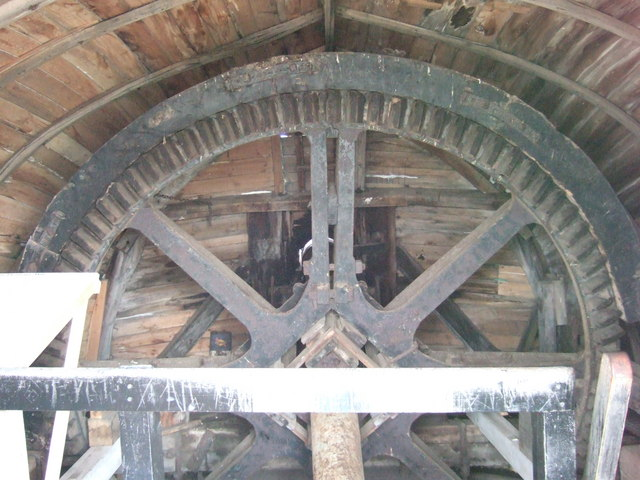
Brake Wheel and Windshaft

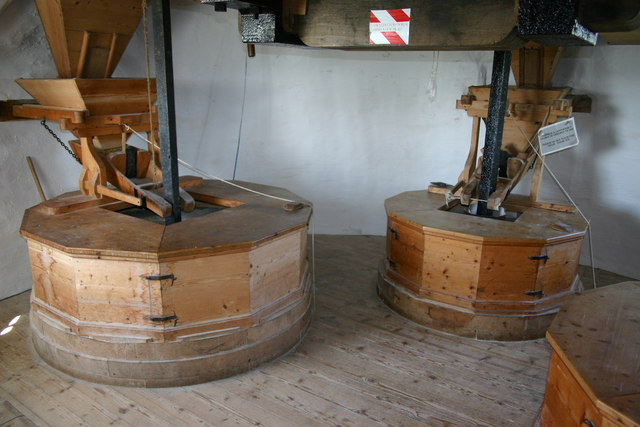
Overdrift millstones

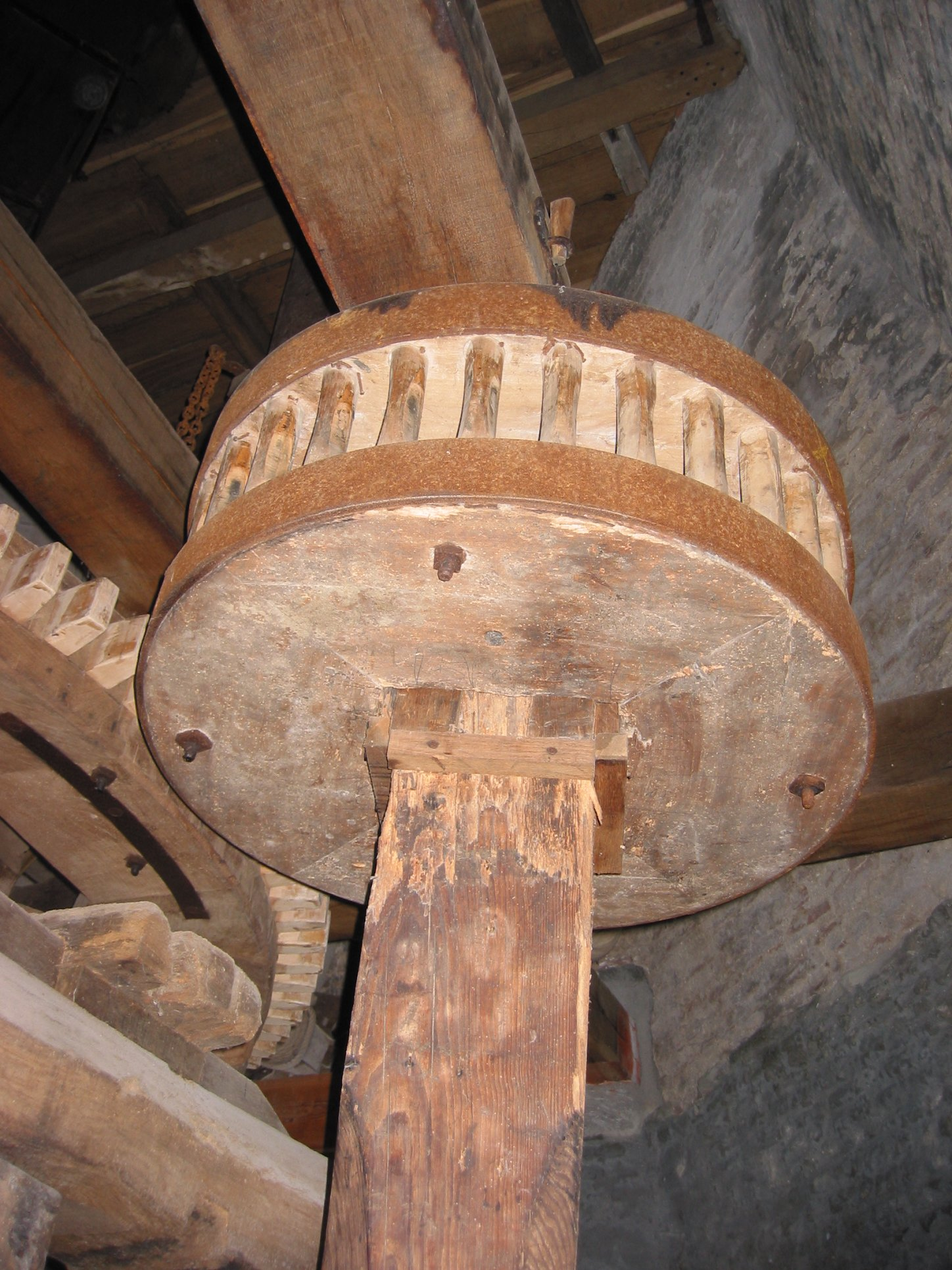
A Lantern Pinion Stone Nut in a Dutch Overdrift windmill

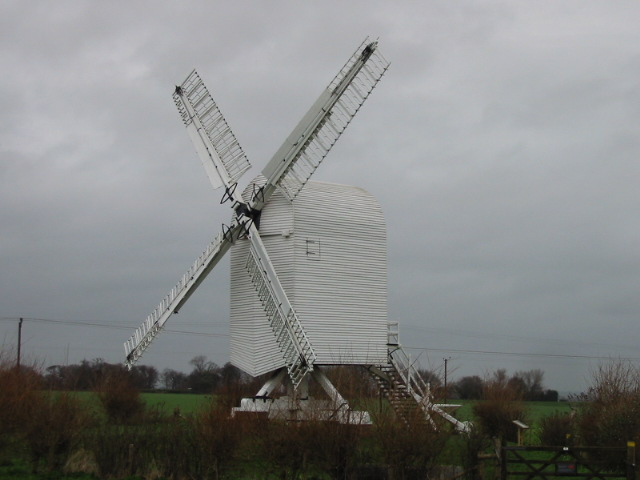
Open Trestle Post Mill with Spring Sails

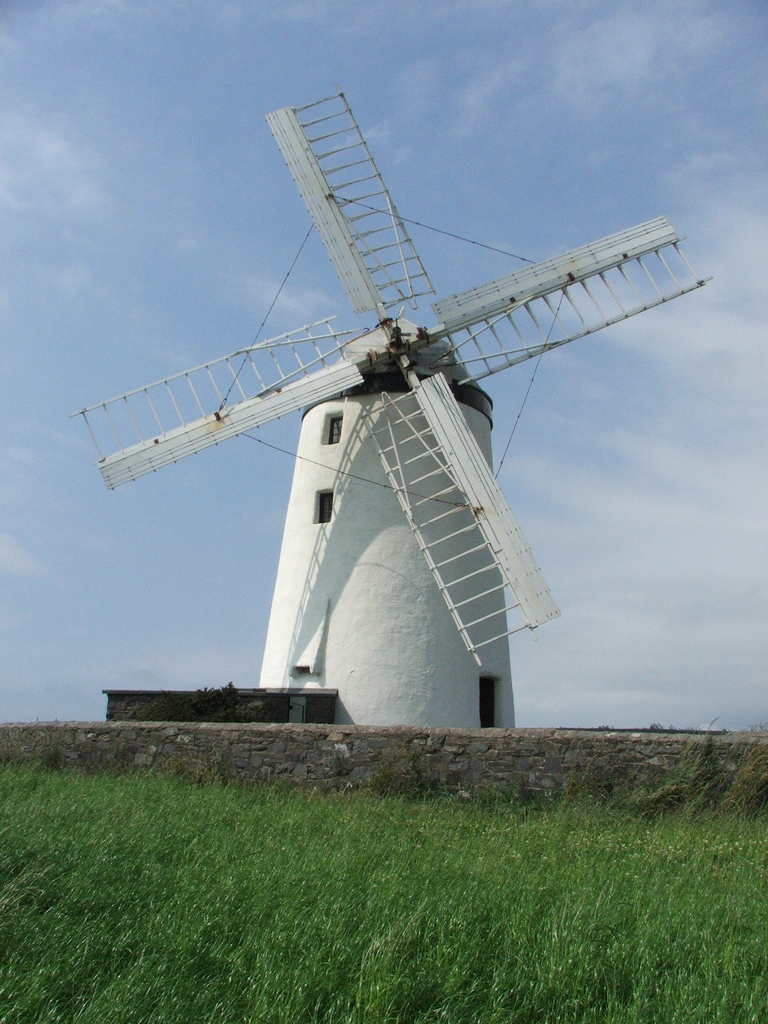
Tower Mill with Roller Reefing Sails

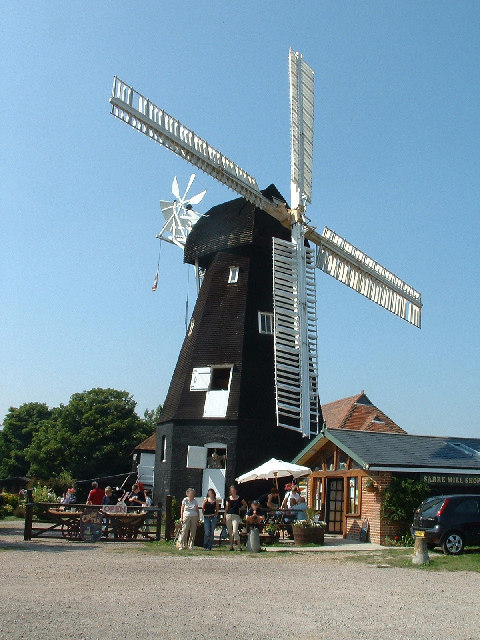
Smock Mill with double Patent Sails

Bedstone
The Bedstone is the bottom of a pair of millstones. It does not move. The upper stone is called the Runner Stone.

Brake Wheel
The Brake Wheel is the main driving wheel in a Smock or Tower mill, and in some post mills. It is carried on the Windshaft and drives the Wallower on the Upright Shaft

Buck
The Buck is an East-Anglian term for the body of a post-mill.

Centrifugal governors
Governors are used to regulate the distance and pressure between millstones in windmills in the 17th century.

Crown Tree
The Crown Tree is the central, single baulk of timber, usually oak, that rests on top of the post in a post mill. Attached to it are the side-girts and the rest of the frame of the buck.

Crown wheel
In a windmill, a Crown Wheel is an auxiliary gear on the Upright Shaft.

Fantail
A fantail is a small windmill which is used to keep a windmill facing into the wind automatically.

Great Spur Wheel
The Great Spur Wheel is carried on the Upright Shaft. It drives the Stone Nuts. Millstones driven by the Great Spur Wheel can be either Overdrift or Underdrift.

Head Wheel
The Head Wheel is carried on the Windshaft in a Post Mill and has a brake around its circumference. It drives a Stone Nut, Millstones driven by the Head Wheel are always Overdrift stones.
Mace
A cross- or square-shaped piece of metal on the top of the spindle from which the runner stone is balanced.
Middling

See Stock

Overdrift
Millstones driven from above are known as Overdrift stones.

Pintle
The pivot centering a post mill on top of the main post.

Runner Stone
The Runner Stone is the topmost of a pair of millstones. It is driven by the Stone Nut. The lower stone is called a Bedstone.

Sails
The Sails are the source of power in a windmill. They are carried on the Windshaft. Most windmills had four sails, although some had five (Boston), six (Waltham, Lincs) or eight sails Heckington, Lincs and there is one recorded twelve sailed windmill (Cottenham, Cambs).

Common Sails have a lattice framework over which a sailcloth is spread. These were the earliest type of sails in northern European windmills.

Spring Sails, invented in 1772 by Andrew Meikle, have shutters adjusted by a spring. Each sail is adjusted individually and, as with Common Sails the mill has to be stopped to enable an adjustment to be made.

Roller Reefing Sails, invented in 1789 by Stephen Hooper, use a canvas strip wound around a roller in the place of shutters. The mill does not have to be stopped in order to adjust the sails.

Patent Sails, invented in 1819 by William Cubitt, combine the shutters of the Spring Sail with the automatic adjustment of the Roller Reefing Sail. Single Patents have shutters on the trailing side of the sail, Double Patents have shutters on both sides of the sail for its whole length.

Samson Head
An iron collar and plate bearing that fits over the pintle of a post-mill's post, that supports the weight of the crown tree, around which the buck of the mill is constructed. An example is visible at High Salvington windmill.

Stock
The beam that passes through the canister of the windshaft, which the sails are bolted onto.

Stone Nut
The Stone Nut is a small gear driven by the Great Spur Wheel, Head Wheel, or Tail Wheel. It drives the Runner Stone either from above (Overdrift) or below (Underdrift).

Tail Wheel
The Tail Wheel is carried on the Windshaft in a Post Mill and drives a Stone Nut. Millstones driven by the Tail Wheel are always Overdrift stones.

Trestle
The Trestle is the substructure of a Post Mill, usually enclosed in a protective structure called a roundhouse, which also serves as a storage facility. Post mills without a roundhouse are called Open Trestle Post Mills.

Underdrift
Millstones driven from beneath are known as Underdrift stones.

Upright Shaft
The Upright Shaft is the main vertical shaft found in Smock and Tower mills. It is also found in some Post mills. It carries the Wallower at its top end, and a Great Spur Wheel at the bottom end. The Great Spur Wheel drives two or more Stone nuts.

Wallower
The Wallower is a driven gear at the top of the Upright Shaft in Smock, Tower and some Post mills. It is driven by the Brake Wheel

Windshaft
The Windshaft carries the Sails and also the Brake Wheel (Smock and Tower mills, and in some Post mills) or the Head Wheel and Tail Wheel in a Post Mill. Windshafts can be wholly made of wood, or wood with a cast iron Poll End (where the Sails are mounted) or entirely of cast iron.

== See also ==
- "A Researcher's Guide to Local History Terminology" - Abecedary
