= William Phillip =

English translator

William Phillip (fl. 1600) was an English translator, known mainly for his loose versions of travel books from the Dutch. Phillip worked for the London printer John Wolfe

== Works ==
Phillip's books include:

- The Pathway to Knowledge, written in Dutch, and translated into English, London, 1596. This was a work on arithmetic, book-keeping and other commercial topics, originally by Nicholaus Petri.
- The Description of a Voyage made by certaine Ships of Holland into the East Indies, with their Adventures and Successe; together with the Description of the Countries, Townes, and Inhabitants of the same: who set forth on the Second of April, 1595, and returned on the 14 of August, 1597, London, 1598; dedicated to Sir James Scudamore; reprinted in Richard Hakluyt's Collection (vol. v. new edit.), and in Oxford Collection of Voyages and Travels (vol. ii.) The original was by Bernardt Langhenez.
- John Huighen van Linschoten his Discours of Voyages into the East and West Indies. Devided into foure Bookes, London, 1598; illustrated with maps, plans, and views copied from the Dutch.
- A true and perfect Description of three Voyages to the North Pole, performed by the Ships of Holland and Zealand, so strange and wonderfull that the like hath never been heard of before, London, 1609; dedicated to Sir Thomas Smythe; abridged in Purchas his Pilgrimes (vol. iii.), and edited by Charles Tilstone Beke for the Hakluyt Society, London, 1853. The original was by Gerrit de Veer.
- The Relation of a Wonderful Voiage made by William Cornelison Schouten of Horne. Showing how South from the Straights of Magelan, in Terra Del-fuogo, he found and discovered a newe Passage through the great South Sea, and that was sayled round about the World. Describing what Islands, Countries, People, and Strange Adventures he found in the saide Passage, London, 1619; dedicated also to Sir Thomas Smythe.
- Newes from Bohemia. An Apologie made by the States of the Kingdom of Bohemia, showing the Reasons why those of the Reformed Religion were moved to take Armes, for the Defence of the King and themselves, especially against the dangerous Sect of Jesuites. Translated out of Dutch into Latine, and thence into English, by Will. Philip [sic], London, 1619.

== Notes ==
Attribution

This article incorporates text from a publication now in the public domain: Lee, Sidney, ed. (1896). "Phillip, William". Dictionary of National Biography. Vol. 45. London: Smith, Elder & Co.
