= Walton Hall, Warwickshire =

Country house in Walton, Warwickshire, England

Coordinates: 52.1687°N 1.5850°W

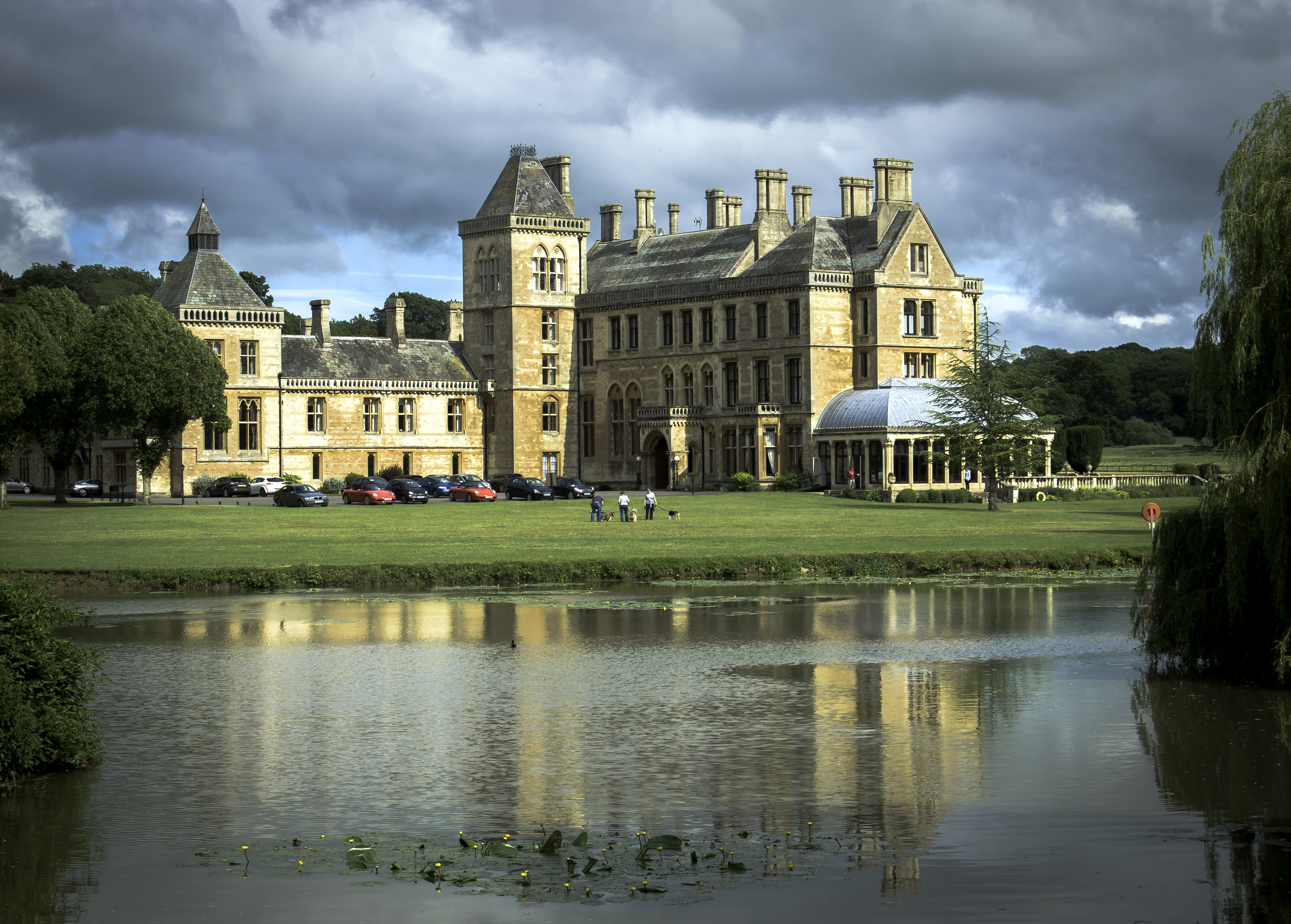
Walton Hall

Walton Hall is a 16th-century country mansion at Walton, near Wellesbourne, Warwickshire, now in use as a hotel operated by Sunday Hotels. It is a Grade II* listed building.

The Manor of Walton was owned by the Lestrange family from the 15th century. In 1541, Barbara Lestrange, heiress of Walton, married Robert Mordaunt. Their son Lestrange Mordaunt was created 1st Baronet Mordaunt in 1611.

In 1858, Sir Charles Mordaunt, 10th Baronet, retained architect George Gilbert Scott to design a new mansion house in the Gothic Revival style. The current Walton Hall has existed since the mid-19th century, but it sits on the site of several older manor houses and its cellars date back to Queen Elizabeth I's time. It was Sir Charles Mordaunt who built the Victorian manor house that guests stay in today, and the matching chapel where wedding blessings take place. The house was completed in 1862 and became infamous through a divorce scandal involving Sir Charles and his wife Harriet several years later.

In the mid-20th century, the main property was owned by the Ministry of Defence and used as a training camp for Army cadets and the rest of the estate was used as a girls' boarding school between 1963 and 1969.

Following its period as a boarding school, Walton Hall was purchased by Lord Field (who also owned Pitfour Castle in Perth), who restored the historic country house for use as a private residence. During his ownership, restoration works were undertaken to preserve the character and architectural heritage of the Grade II* listed building while returning the estate to residential use. The property was subsequently sold to the performer Danny La Rue who converted the main house to be used as a hotel. La Rue spent more than £1 million on the purchase and restoration of Walton Hall and signed it over in 1983, as he could not manage it and his career, to a pair of Canadian con men. La Rue had given control of the hotel to the two Canadians with a promise of further investment with the retention of La Rue's name on the hotel itself. This eventually led to a police investigation where La Rue was cleared of any suspicion but discovered he had lost more than £1 million. The con men had deeply bankrupted La Rue but he insisted in continuing to work to pay off the debts incurred rather than retire.

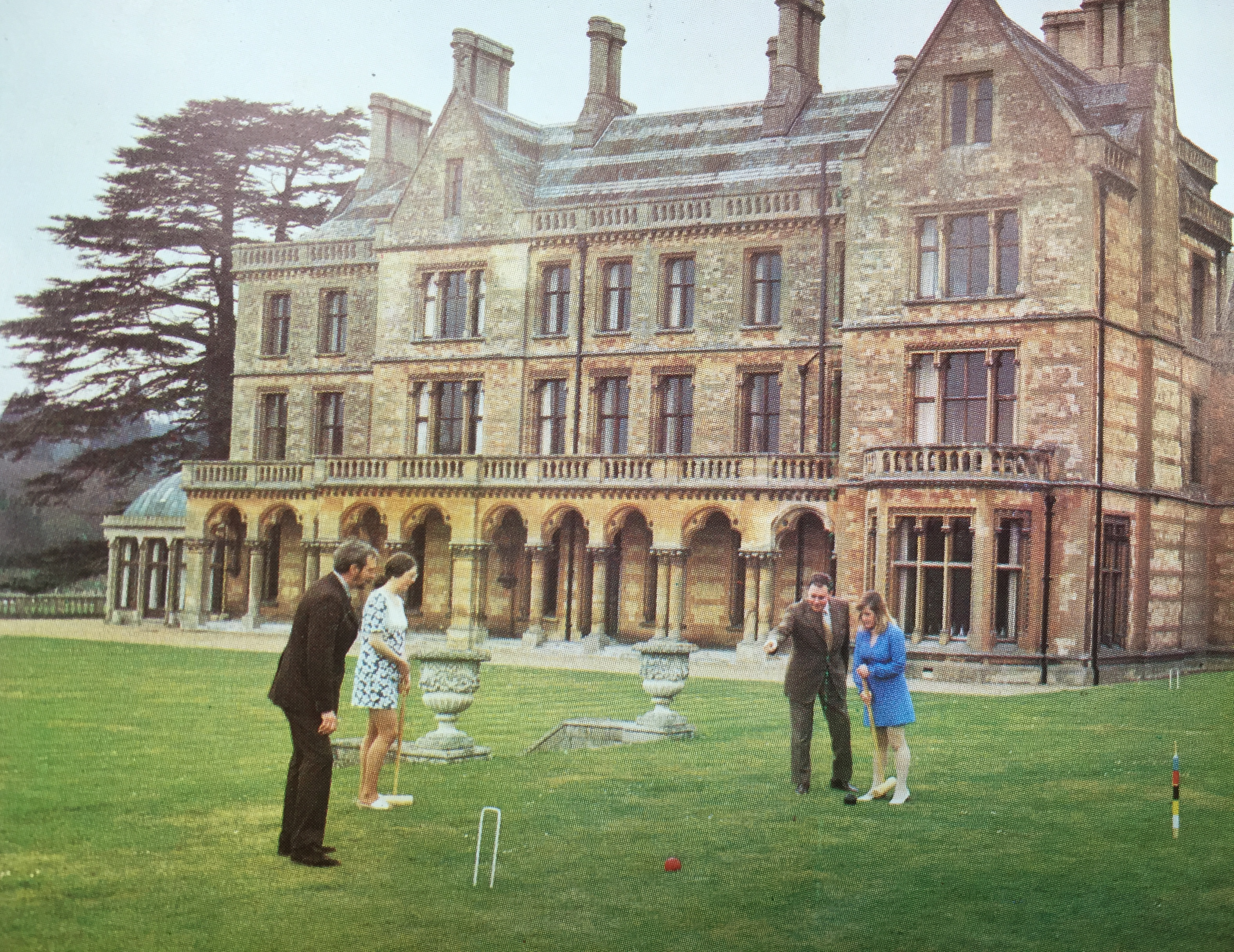

In the 1980s, Walton Hall was the focus of a timeshare venture which collapsed with debts of £5m; owner Graham Maynard was sentenced to 15 months in jail for fraud (following an edition of The Cook Report in 1991 focused on him), but walked free having spent 8 1/2 months in a Spanish jail.

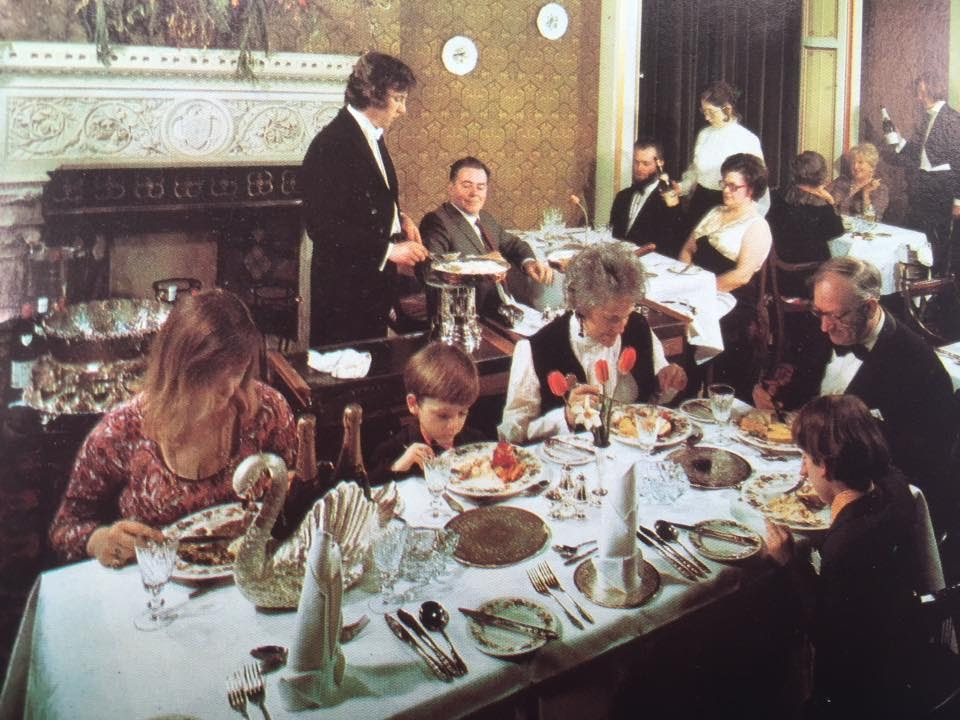
Field Family Dining at Walton hall in 1973

Today, the adjacent 1860s stable block (Grade II listed) is a time-share accommodation, which is not linked to the 1980s incident.

Walton Hall was featured in Series 5 of the BBC comedy Keeping Up Appearances. In the episode, titled "The Rolls-Royce", Hyacinth and Richard drive a showroom car to Walton Hall.

A time-share at the hall was awarded as Bully's Star Prize in an early 1980s episode of the Central Television darts and quiz programme Bullseye, consisting of one week every year for 25 years. The prize could be exchanged for an equivalent at a time-share at one of several locations around the world, including the Americas and Australia.

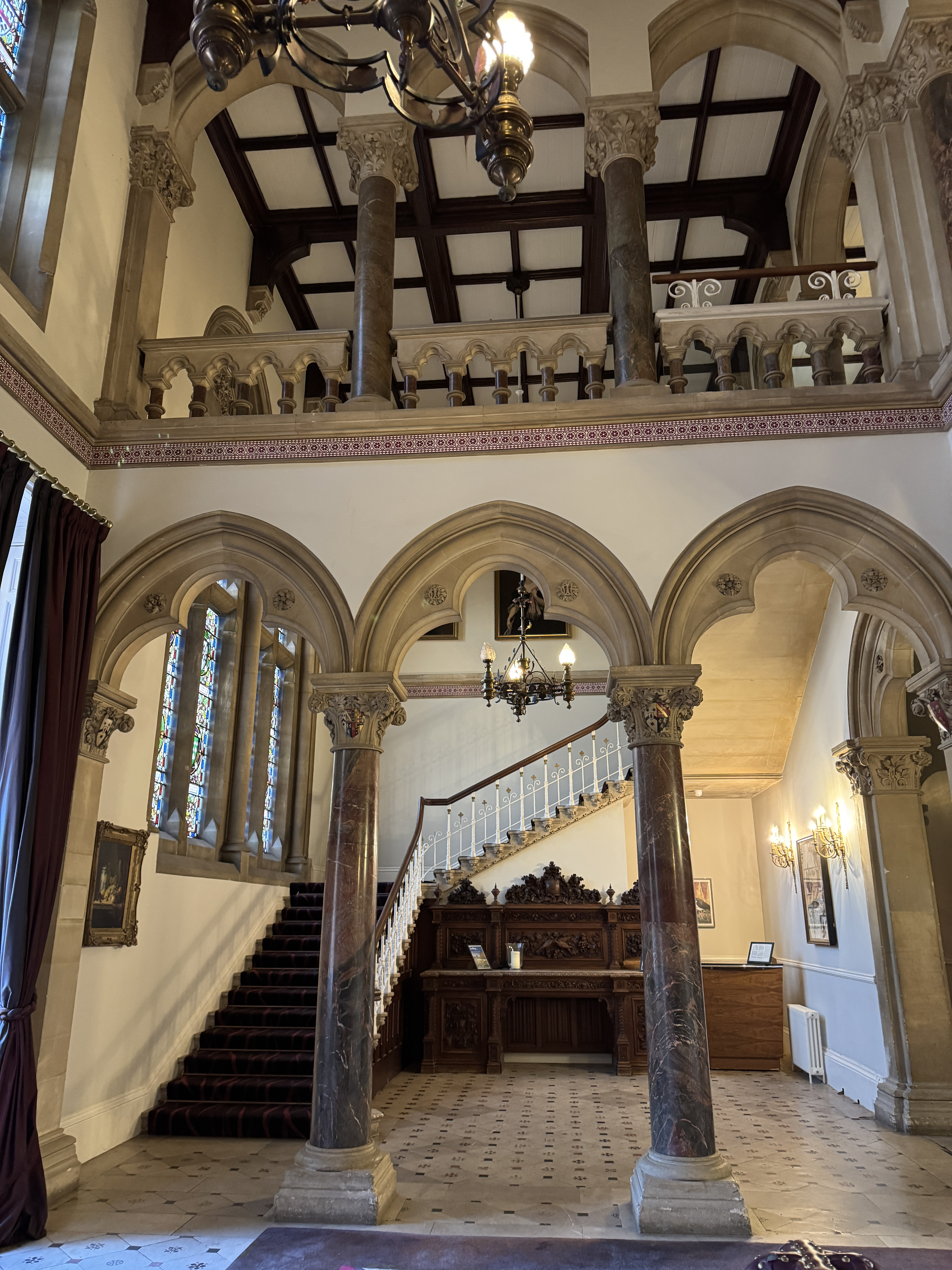
The great hall and staircase in Walton Hall
