= Robert Phillip =

Scottish Roman Catholic priest

Robert Phillip (died 4 January 1647 at Paris) was a Scottish Roman Catholic priest, the confessor to Henrietta Maria of France.

== Life ==
He was descended from the Scottish family of Phillip of Sanquhar, but nothing is known of his early life. Ordained in Rome, he returned in 1612 to Scotland where he was betrayed by his father, seized while saying Mass, and tried at Edinburgh as a seminary priest, 14 September 1613.

The sentence of death was commuted to banishment. He withdrew to France, joining the French Oratory recently founded by Cardinal de Bérulle. In 1628 he went to England as confessor to Queen Henrietta Maria. At her request he asked the pope for financial aid against the enemies of Charles I of England. The subsequent negotiations were discovered, and Phillip was impeached on the charge of being a papal spy and of having endeavoured to pervert Prince Charles, but proceedings dropped owing to the displeasure of Richelieu at the introduction of his own name into the matter.

Later he was committed to the Tower of London for refusing to be sworn on the Anglican Bible on 2 November 1641, when he had been summoned by the House of Lords committee to be examined touching State matters. Released through the queen's influence, he accompanied her to The Hague in March, 1642, and remained with her in Paris till his death.
