= River Dene =

River in Warwickshire, England

Dene
- Old Stratford and Midland Junction Railway bridge over the River Dene at Kineton.

Location
- Country: England
- County: Warwickshire

Physical characteristics
- Source
  - location: Burton Dassett Hills
- Mouth: Avon
  - location: Charlecote Park
  - coordinates: 52°12′16″N 1°37′23″W

The River Dene is a river in Warwickshire, England.

It is a tributary of the Avon, which it joins at Charlecote Park. The headwaters of the River Dene rise on the western slopes of the Burton Dassett Hills and flow westward towards Kineton. Five miles downstream of Kineton, the river turns abruptly north, flowing through the villages of Walton and Wellesbourne before joining the Avon.

To the west of Kineton, the Dene was followed, and bridged in numerous places, by the Stratford-upon-Avon and Midland Junction Railway. At Kineton can be seen the remains of four sets of sluice-gates, possibly used for flooding the land in the cultivation of osiers for use in basket making.

== See also ==
- Rivers of the United Kingdom
