= Port Phillip Arcade =

Arcade in Melbourne, Victoria

Coordinates: 37°49′2.207″S 144°57′59.642″E

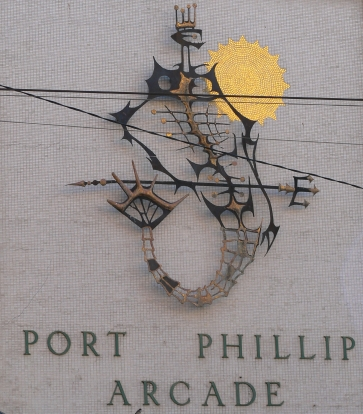
Mural at Port Phillip Arcade

Port Phillip Arcade was a small arcade in Melbourne, the capital city of the Australian state of Victoria with several cafés and general food outlets. It connects Flinders Lane with Flinders Street between Swanston Street and Degraves Street.

== Demolition ==
The tenants of Port Phillip Arcade were given until September 5, 2017, to clear and leave their premises so that the arcade can be demolished in preparation for the Melbourne Metro Rail Project. The Melbourne Metro Rail Project is not offering compensation for loss of business or community. Individual offers have been made to tenants ranging from $30,000 to $125,000 to cover the costs of relocation.
