= Wellesbourne =

Village in Warwickshire, England

Coordinates: 52.19434°N 1.59472°W

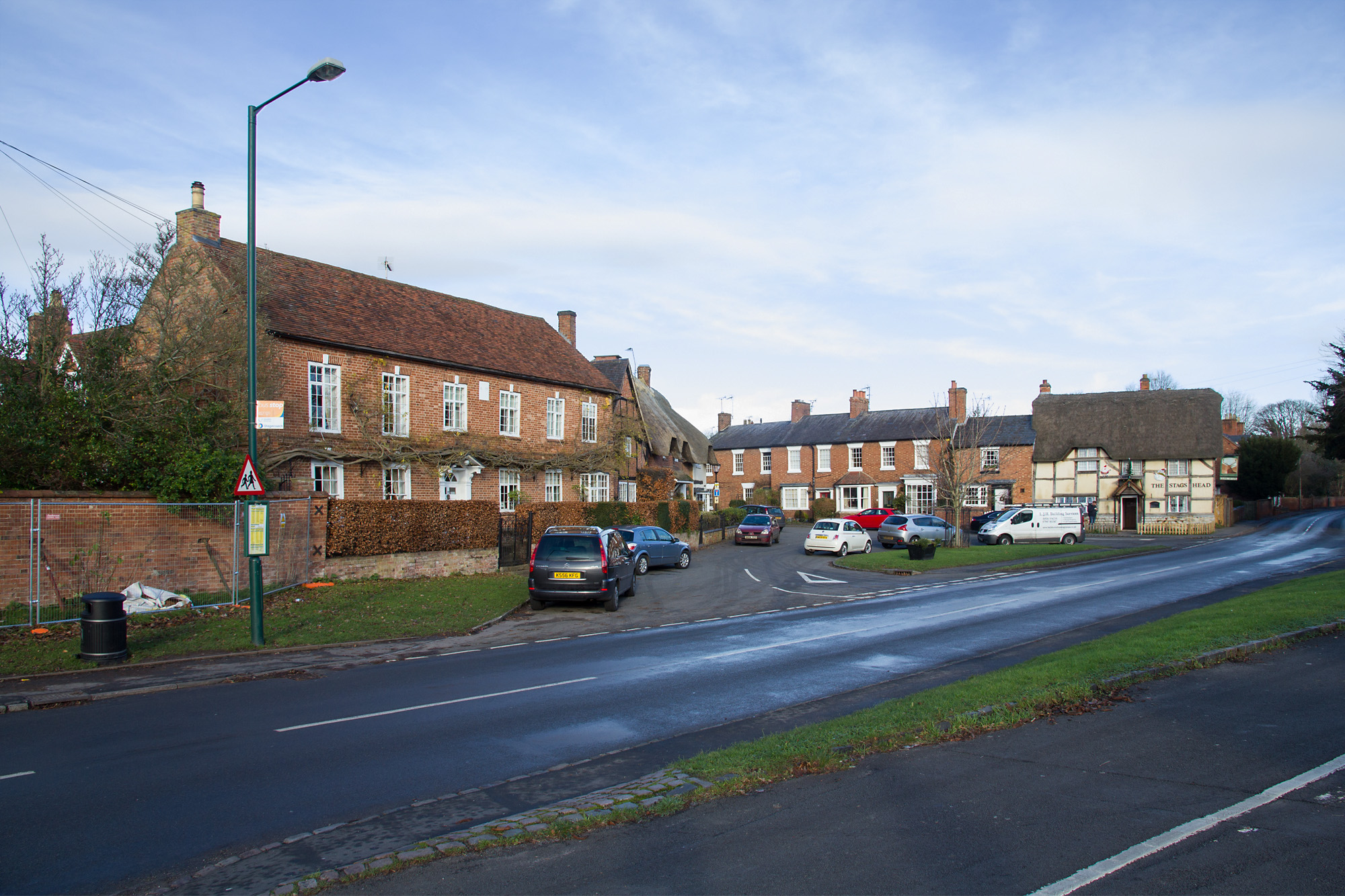
- Chestnut Square, Wellesbourne

- Location within Warwickshire
- Population: 7,283 (2021)
- OS grid reference: SP278552
- Civil parish: Wellesbourne and Walton
- District: Stratford-on-Avon
- Shire county: Warwickshire
- Region: West Midlands
- Country: England
- Sovereign state: United Kingdom
- Post town: WARWICK
- Postcode district: CV35
- Dialling code: 01789
- Police: Warwickshire
- Fire: Warwickshire
- Ambulance: West Midlands
- UK Parliament: Kenilworth and Southam; Stratford-on-Avon

Wellesbourne is a large village in the civil parish of Wellesbourne and Walton, in the county of Warwickshire, in the West Midlands region of England. In the 2021 census the parish had a population of 7,283, a significant increase from 5,849 In the 2011 census. The civil parish was renamed from Wellesbourne to Wellesbourne and Walton on 1 April 2014.

Wellesbourne sits on the A429 road, and is located around 7 miles (11 km) south of Warwick and 5 miles (8.0 km) east of Stratford-upon-Avon. Nearby villages include Loxley, Hampton Lucy, Charlecote, Walton and Kineton.

== History ==
The name was first recorded in 862 as Wallesburam. It was later referred to as Waleborne in the Domesday Book.

In May 1140 Wellesbourne was hit by a tornado – one of the earliest recorded in the British Isles. It damaged several buildings and killed a woman.

Wellesbourne was once two villages – Wellesbourne Mountford and Wellesbourne Hastings, the two villages being divided by the River Dene; the former lying to the south of the river, and the latter to the north. In 1947 the two parishes were merged, and are now considered to be a single village. For these historical reasons Wellesbourne has two village centres, Chestnut Square and the Precinct respectively. The Chestnut Square area no longer contains commercial premises but the old shop fronts are visible in what are now houses.

Wellesbourne Hall in the village, dates from about 1700 and is grade II* listed.

Perhaps the most significant event in Wellesbourne's history was the founding in 1872 of the National Agricultural Labourers Union by Joseph Arch – an event once celebrated by an annual parade, which it was hoped to be revived in 2010. There was little interest from the Trade Unions which once featured quite prominently, but the Wellesbourne Action Group still organises a walk from Barford to Wellesbourne around 9 June each year along the Joseph Arch Way. There is a somewhat unusual memorial in the form of a plaque in the village bus shelter dating from 1952. The initial meetings were held in the historic Stag's Head pub, which the bus shelter is located opposite. The thatched building was built in 1640 and became a pub in 1830. It was devastated by fire in 2021, but following extensive restoration was reopened a year later. The King's Head on Warwick Road is the village's only other pub.

During the Second World War the Royal Air Force opened an airfield; RAF Wellesbourne Mountford immediately south of the village, from 1965 this was converted into a civilian airfield.

Since the 1960s new housing developments have meant that Wellesbourne has grown significantly. In the 1980s 800 houses were built on the Dovehouse estate, this was built on part of the site of the airfield and the streets are named after the aircraft which once flew from there.

== Features ==
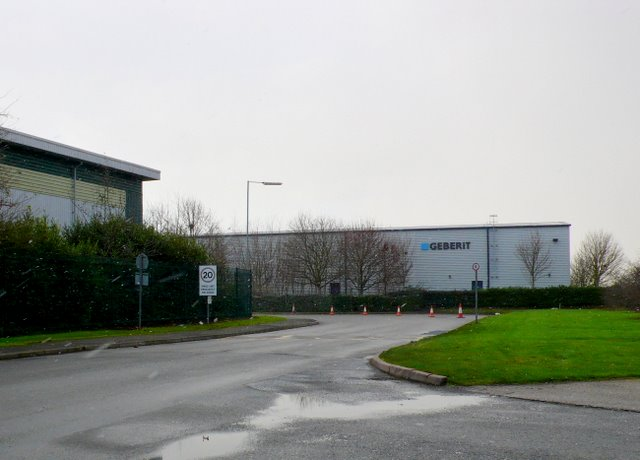
The main entrance to the industrial park

Outside the village is Warwick Crop Centre which is part of the University of Warwick. It was originally established in 1949 as the National Vegetable Research Centre. It became Horticulture Research International in 1990, which was bought by the university in 2004. The establishment, which covers 472 acres (191 ha) is recognised internationally for its research in sustainable agriculture, horticulture and food security.

Chedham's Yard, a historic agricultural building with blacksmith's and wheelwright's workshops, won BBC TV's Restoration Village competition in 2006.

=== Airfield ===
There is a small airfield called Wellesbourne Mountford Airfield, also the site of Wellesbourne Market, the Midlands' largest open-air market, held every Saturday and bank holiday Mondays.

The airfield hosts a Wings and Wheels event each year which features a number of classic vehicles and military vehicles. Events have taken place in June since 2010. 2014 celebrated the 50th anniversary of XM655 having been delivered to the RAF and the 30th anniversary of the aircraft's delivery to Wellesbourne.

There is also a museum which includes a number of aircraft and a wartime emergency underground bunker.

=== Churches ===
St Peter's parish church

There are two churches in Wellesbourne, St. Peter's parish church and a Methodist church.

=== Schools ===
Wellesbourne is home to Wellesbourne Church of England primary school.

=== Sport ===
Wellesbourne has a football club, Wellesbourne Wanderers FC.

Wellesbourne has a badminton club, based at Kineton School and a cycling club called the Wellesbourne Wheelers.

== Politics ==
Following a boundary change most of Wellesbourne is now in the parliamentary constituency of Kenilworth and Southam. Two roads, Hammond Green and Ramsay Green built west of the old parish boundary are still attached to Stratford.

For local government, Wellesbourne falls under the areas of Warwickshire County Council and Stratford-on-Avon District Council, which are both responsible for different aspects of local government. Wellesbourne also has a parish council as the most local tier of government, which is represented by 11 councillors from three wards.

== Climate ==
Wellesbourne has a warm-summer oceanic climate (Köppen: Cfb) like the vast majority of the UK, with warm summers, cool winters, and light to moderate precipitation year round. The surrounding area is low-lying and relatively far from the moderating influence of any large bodies of water, hence winter minima are lower and summer maxima are higher than one might expect, although sunshine hours are limited due to convective cloud development during summer. Wellesbourne is also notably drier than the UK average.

Climate data for Wellesbourne 47m asl, 1991-2020
Month	Jan	Feb	Mar	Apr	May	Jun	Jul	Aug	Sep	Oct	Nov	Dec	Year
Mean daily maximum °C (°F)	7.7 (45.9)	8.4 (47.1)	10.9 (51.6)	14.1 (57.4)	17.3 (63.1)	20.3 (68.5)	22.8 (73.0)	22.4 (72.3)	19.3 (66.7)	14.9 (58.8)	10.6 (51.1)	8.0 (46.4)	14.7 (58.5)
Mean daily minimum °C (°F)	1.6 (34.9)	1.5 (34.7)	2.8 (37.0)	4.3 (39.7)	7.1 (44.8)	10.0 (50.0)	12.0 (53.6)	12.0 (53.6)	9.9 (49.8)	7.4 (45.3)	4.2 (39.6)	1.9 (35.4)	6.2 (43.2)
Average rainfall mm (inches)	52.2 (2.06)	39.9 (1.57)	39.8 (1.57)	45.6 (1.80)	54.7 (2.15)	52.5 (2.07)	56.9 (2.24)	59.9 (2.36)	50.9 (2.00)	63.3 (2.49)	59.1 (2.33)	55.7 (2.19)	630.5 (24.83)
Average rainy days (≥ 1.0 mm)	11.2	9.5	9.0	9.4	9.0	8.8	8.5	9.3	9.4	10.3	12.1	11.1	117.6
Mean monthly sunshine hours	57.0	79.1	116.4	157.8	196.0	190.1	199.8	180.8	142.9	106.7	66.0	54.1	1,546.7
Source: Met office
