= Philippson =

- Pronunciation: FEE-lip-son
- Gender: Male

Origin
- Meaning: "lover of horses"
- Region of origin: Germany

Other names
- Related names: De Filippis, DeFilippo, DiFilippo, Filipescu, Filipov, Filipovič, Filipović, Filipovski, Filipowicz, Filippenko, Filippópoulos, Filippou, Filippov, Filipsons, Filipsson, Killip, McPhillips, Mac Philbín, McKillop, Phelps, Philips, Philipsson, Phillips, Phillipson, Phipps, Pilipavičius, Piliposyan

Philippson is a patronymic surname meaning "son of Philipp", coming from the German language given name variant of "Philip", both derived from philippos, of Ancient Greek origin (prefix philein, meaning "to love"; suffix hippos, meaning "horses"; combined, becoming "lover of horses").

"Philipp" evolved into "Philippson", a German surname especially prevalent amongst German Jews and Dutch Jews, often shortened back to Phillips.

"Phillip" evolved into "Phillipson", an English and Welsh surname. Philippson or Phillipson may refer to:

- Alfred Philippson (1864–1953), German geologist and geographer
- Antony Phillipson (born 1971), British High Commissioner to Singapore and South Africa
- A. T. Phillipson (1910–1977), British vet and psychologist
- Bridget Phillipson (born 1983), British politician
- Caspar Phillipson (born 1971), Danish actor
- Coleman Phillipson (1878–1958), English legal scholar and historian
- David Phillipson (born 1942), British archaeologist
- Eddie Phillipson (1910–1991), English cricketer
- Ernst Alfred Philippson (1900–1993), German-American philologist
- Frank Phillipson (active 1934), English athlete
- Heather Phillipson (born 1978), British artist
- John Phillipson (1698–1756), British navy administrator and politician
- Ludwig Philippson (1811–1889), German rabbi and author
- Sibyl Anikeef (1896–1997), born as Marie Augusta Phillipson, American photographer
- Paul Phillipson (born 1952), Indian-born English cricketer
- Richard Burton Phillipson (c. 1723–1792), British soldier and politician
- Robert Phillipson (born 1942), English-born Danish professor and author
- Tom Phillipson (1898–1965), English footballer

== See also ==
- Philipson
