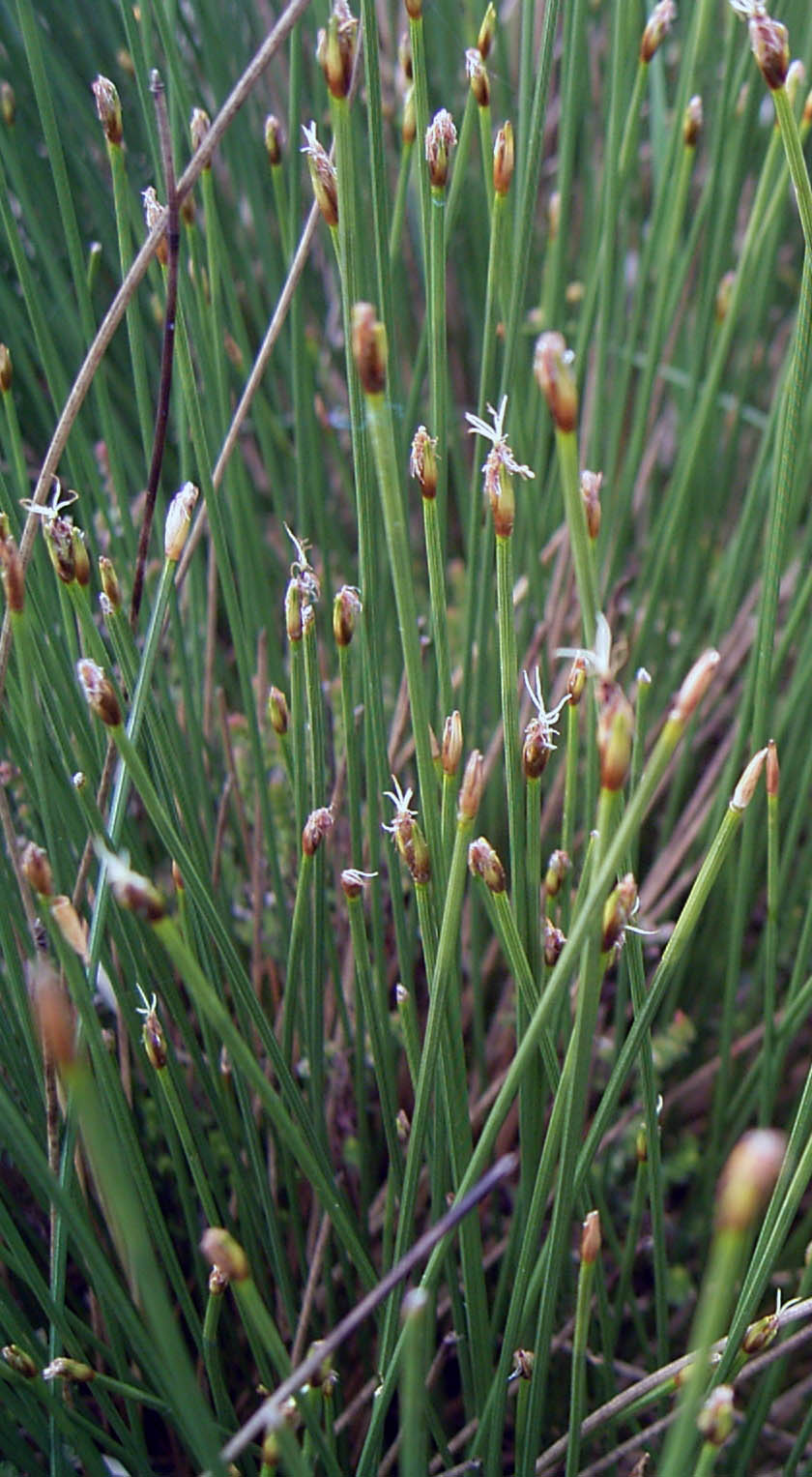
- Inflorescences

Scientific classification
- Kingdom: Plantae
- Clade: Tracheophytes
- Clade: Angiosperms
- Clade: Monocots
- Clade: Commelinids
- Order: Poales
- Family: Cyperaceae
- Genus: Trichophorum
- Species: T. cespitosum
- Subspecies: T. c. subsp. germanicum

Trinomial name
- Trichophorum cespitosum subsp. germanicum (Palla) Hegi

Synonyms
- 6 Synonyms: Baeothryon cespitosum subsp. germanicum (Palla) Á.Löve & D.Löve (1965); B. germanicum (Palla) Holub (1983); Scirpus cespitosus var. germanicus (Palla) Asch. & Graebn. (1898); S. cespitosus subsp. germanicus (Palla) Brodd. (1912); S. germanicus (Palla) W.F.Christ. (1935); Trichophorum germanicum Palla (1897)

= Trichophorum cespitosum subsp. germanicum =

Subspecies of flowering plant

Trichophorum cespitosum subsp. germanicum is a subspecies of Trichophorum cespitosum. It is a characteristic plant of nutrient-poor moors, wet heaths and moorland forests in Europe. The mostly hedgehog-shaped form of its tufts is characteristic.

== Description ==
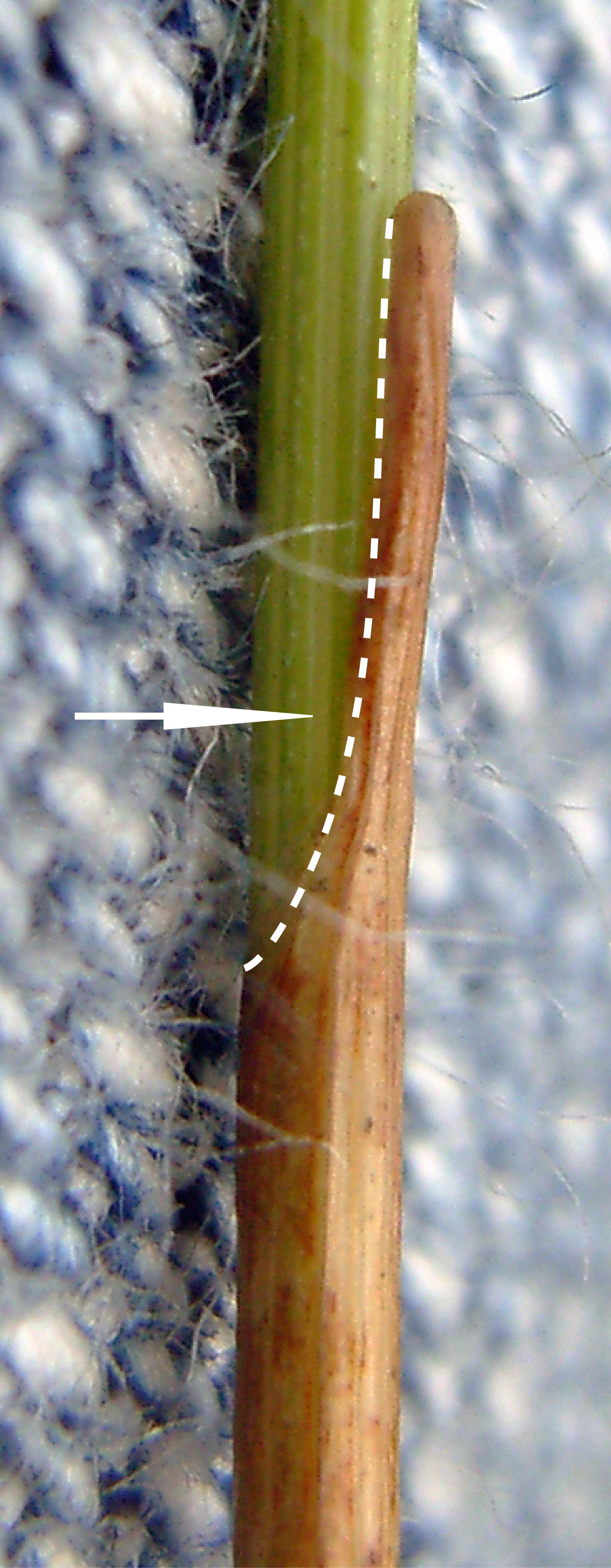
Leaf sheath with leaf remnant

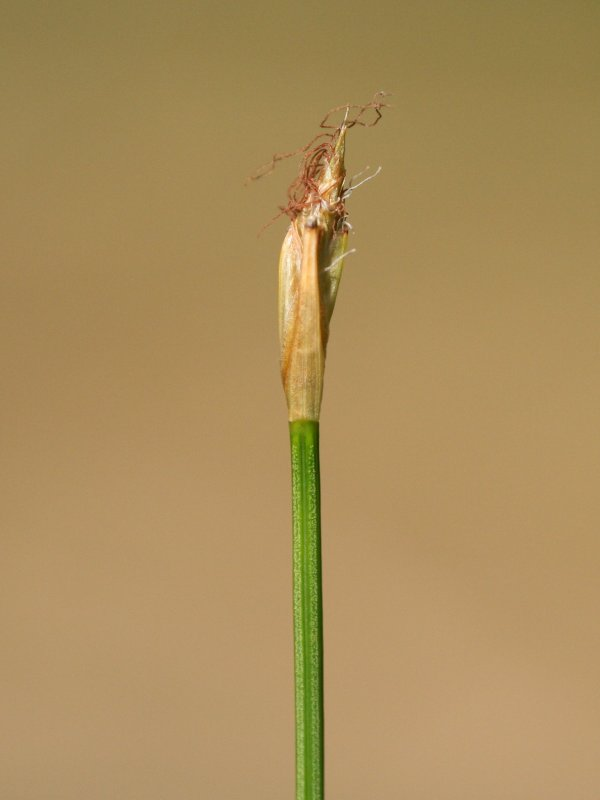
Detail of the inflorescence and bract

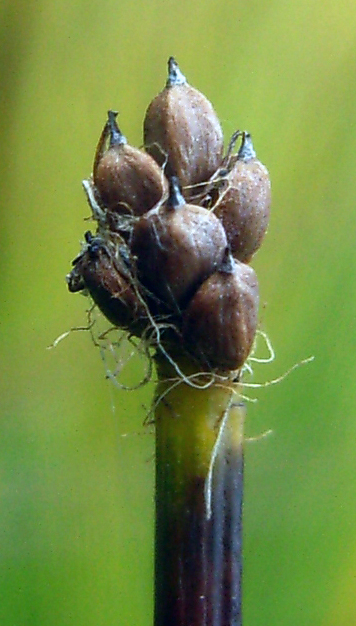
Infructescence

=== Vegetative characteristics ===
Trichophorum cespitosum subsp. germanicum is a perennial, herbaceous plant that grows to a height of 5 to 60 centimetres. This hemicryptophyte forms small to medium-sized, dense, rigid clumps, which in turn can form dense turfs; no runners are formed. The base of the stem is roundish to triangular-roundish. The basal leaf sheaths are leathery brown and shiny. The stems grow rigidly upright or diagonally upwards, sometimes bent over at fruiting time. The stems are round in cross-section, smooth and green to dark green.

The leaf sheaths of the lower leaves are usually without leaf blades. The uppermost leaf sheath is cut off at an angle and is more than 2 millimeters deep at the base of the leaf blade. The 1 millimeter wide uppermost leaf blade is about twice as long as the cut-out is deep (see picture on the left). The ligules are very short.

=== Generative features ===
It flowers from May to July, rarely later. The one or two bracts are similar to the glumes and are about as long as the inflorescence. The inflorescence consists of a single, terminal, erect spikelet. With a length of 5 to 10 millimeters, the spikelets are obovate or elongated to club-shaped and contain three to twenty flowers. The flowers contain three stamens and three stigmas.

The main axis of the spikelets, the spikelet rachis, is about 3 millimeters long after the fruit has fallen off. The glumes are elongated lanceolate, pointed, 3 to 4 millimeters long, yellow to reddish-brown, with a green keel and membranous edge. The five to six perianth bristles (perigone) are usually significantly longer than the fruit.

The caryopsis, which is grey to yellow-brown when ripe, is flattened triangular at a length of 1.5 to 2 millimeters and narrows towards the upper end. The number of chromosomes is 2n = 104.

=== Possibilities of confusion ===
Trichophorun species are generally similar in appearance to Eleocharis species. In contrast to these, however, they have a clear, albeit short, leaf blade on the uppermost leaf sheath.

The common rush (Trichophorum cespitosum subsp. cespitosum) is very similar. Its uppermost leaf sheath is only about 1 millimeter deep at the base of the leaf blade. The uppermost leaf blade is about five times as long as the notch is deep. The terminal spikelet is 5 to 6 millimeters long; the spikelet spindles are 2 millimeters long or longer after the fruits have fallen off.

== Distribution ==
Trichophorum cespitosum subsp. germanicum occurs exclusively in western Europe, namely in Portugal, Spain, France, Belgium, the Netherlands, Germany, Denmark (including the Faroe Islands), Great Britain (including the Shetland Islands and the Hebrides), Ireland, Norway and Sweden. It is replaced to the south, north and east by Trichophorum cespitosum subsp. cespitosum. Its total area is estimated at 100,000 to one million km^{2}. The proportion of its range in Germany is 10 to 33 percent. Here it is found in the northern Black Forest, the Harz Mountains and the northern German lowlands. The Federal Republic of Germany represents the south-eastern outer edge of its continuously populated range.

== Site conditions ==
Trichophorum cespitosum subsp. germanicum rows optimally in full light and only tolerates shade to a limited extent. Its ecological focus is on wet, partially flooded, highly acidic, very low-nitrogen moorland soils and bogs. It is not saline. It is also a moderate heat indicator. IT is mainly found in submontane-temperate areas of western Europe with an oceanic climate. Its ecological behavior can be classified according to the Ellenberg indicator values as follows: L-8, T-5, K-2, F-9, R-1, N-1, S-0.

In Switzerland, the ecological indicator values according to Landolt et al. 2010 are: moisture index F = 4w+ (very moist but highly variable), light index L = 4 (bright), reaction index R = 1 (highly acidic), temperature index T = 3 (montane), nutrient index N = 1 (very nutrient-poor), continentality index K = 1 (oceanic).

It is a so-called competitive stress strategist. Plant taxa in this group are perennial, highly competitive species on sites with at least one minimum or maximum ecological factor (stress). These include, for example, marsh plants, plants in dry locations or tall mountain plants that can cope with the extreme conditions of their locations and thus have a competitive advantage over other plants.

An effective internal nutrient cycle is characteristic - and many other raised bog plants. The nutrients required to build up the above-ground parts of the plant are transferred back to the base of the shoot during seed formation. In the following vegetation period, this supply can be mobilized without losses. In addition, intensive rooting of the upper soil layers and the very closely spaced plant specimens prevent nutrients from dead plant parts from being washed out.

== Ecology ==
Trichophorum cespitosum subsp. germanicum forms a so-called mycorrhiza with fungi. This symbiosis allows it to better absorb the scarce soil nutrients. It is pollinated by wind (anemophilous) and its seeds are also spread by the wind (anemochory).

== Phytosociology ==
From a phytosociological point of view, it is the characteristic species of the association Sphagno compacti-Trichophoretum germanici (Oberd. 1938) Bartsch 1940 em. Dierßen 1975 (in German: Rasenbinsen-Anmoor) within the bell heather-wet heath communities (association Ericion tetralicis). Characteristic species of these plant communities are peat mosses such as Sphagnum compactum, Sphagnum tenellum, bell heather (Erica tetralix), yellow bog lily (Narthecium ossifragum), narrow-leaved cotton grass (Eriophorum angustifolium), blue moor grass (Molinia caerulea) and bog birch (Betula pubescens). Other heather plants such as common cranberry (Vaccinium oxycoccos), various bilberrys (Vaccinium uliginosum, Vaccinium myrtillus) and sheath cottongrass (Eriophorum vaginatum) are constant companions.

== Etymology of the scientific name ==
The genus name Trichophorum goes back etymologically to the fruiting stem, which is covered with a fine tuft of woolly hairs after ripening, and is derived from the ancient Greek words thríx, genitive trichós and Greek -phóros. However, only the alpine grass (Trichophorum alpinum) has such a "woolly head" (peristome) and shows the close relationship to the genus of cotton grasses (Eriophorum). In the other species of the genus Trichophorum, the perianth is reduced to fine bristles. Artepithetum cespitosum comes from the Latin caespēs gen. caespitis and is translated as "turf-forming". The name for the subspecies germanicum is derived from the area of Germany.

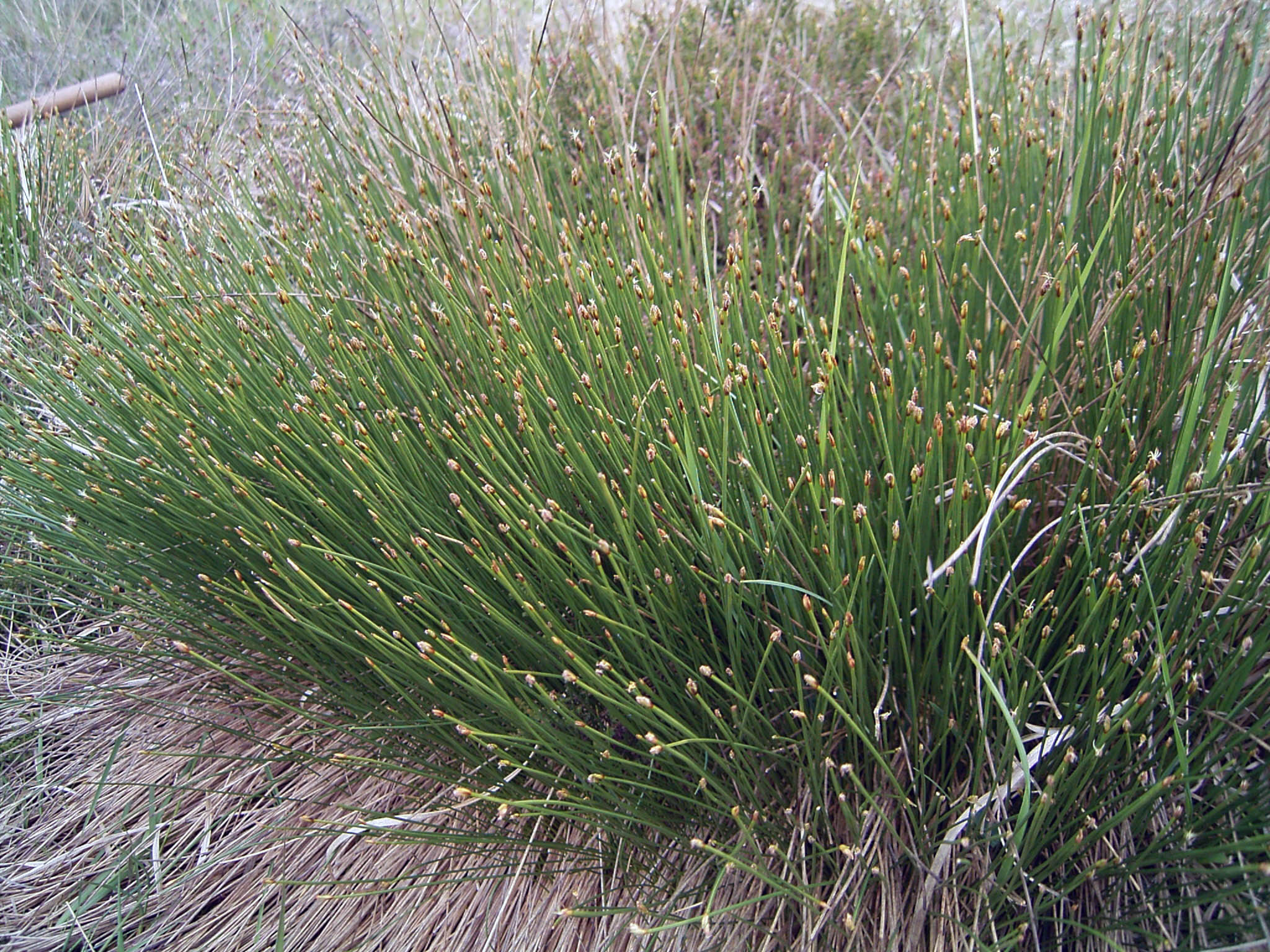
Trichophorum cespitosum subsp. germanicum in a raised bog nature reserve in northwest Germany

== Conservation ==
Trichophorum cespitosum subsp. germanicum is not endangered throughout Europe and enjoys no special legal protection. In Germany, however, it is classified as "endangered" (endangerment category 3). In Hamburg and Mecklenburg-Western Pomerania, it is classified as "threatened with extinction" (endangerment category 1). In Brandenburg and Berlin, it is now "extinct" (endangerment category 0). In north-western Germany, it has declined sharply, particularly due to the cultivation of moorland heaths. Larger populations now only grow in some nature reserves; small remnants can usually still be found along forest paths and edges in areas of afforested heathland.
