= Philipson =

Philipson or Phillipson is a surname.

Philipson has also been the original uncut version of Phillips; a German surname especially prevalent amongst German Jews and Dutch Jews.

It may refer to:

- A. T. Phillipson (1910–1971), Scottish vet
- Charles Philipson (1928–1990), Norwegian jurist
- Craig Philipson (born 1982), Australian cricketer
- David Philipson (1862–1949), American Reform rabbi, orator, and author
- Dino Philipson (1889–1972), Italian lawyer and politician
- Sir George Hare Philipson (1836–1918), English physician
- Hilton Philipson (1892–1941), British politician; elected as MP from Berwick-upon-Tweed but election was overturned
- Hylton Philipson (1866–1935), English cricketer and gardener
- Hylton Murray-Philipson (1902–1934), British politician; MP from Peebles and Southern
- Lennart Philipson (1929–2011), Swedish virologist
- Mabel Philipson (1887–1951), British actress and politician; MP from Berwick-upon-Tweed 1923–29
- Melva Philipson (1925–2015), New Zealand botanist
- Morris Philipson (1926–2011), American novelist and book publisher
- Sir Robin Philipson (1916–1992), British artist
- Sten Philipson (born 1946), Swedish ethicist
- Tomas J. Philipson, American professor of health economics

== See also ==
- Phillipson
- Philippson
