= Stone parsley =

Stone parsley may refer to several herb flowering plants in the Apiaceae family.

- Sison amomum, a plant species in the Apiaceae family native to Southern Europe.
- Cryptotaenia japonica, a plant species in the Apiaceae family native to East Asia.
- Seseli, a plant genus, of around 140 species, in the Apiaceae family.
