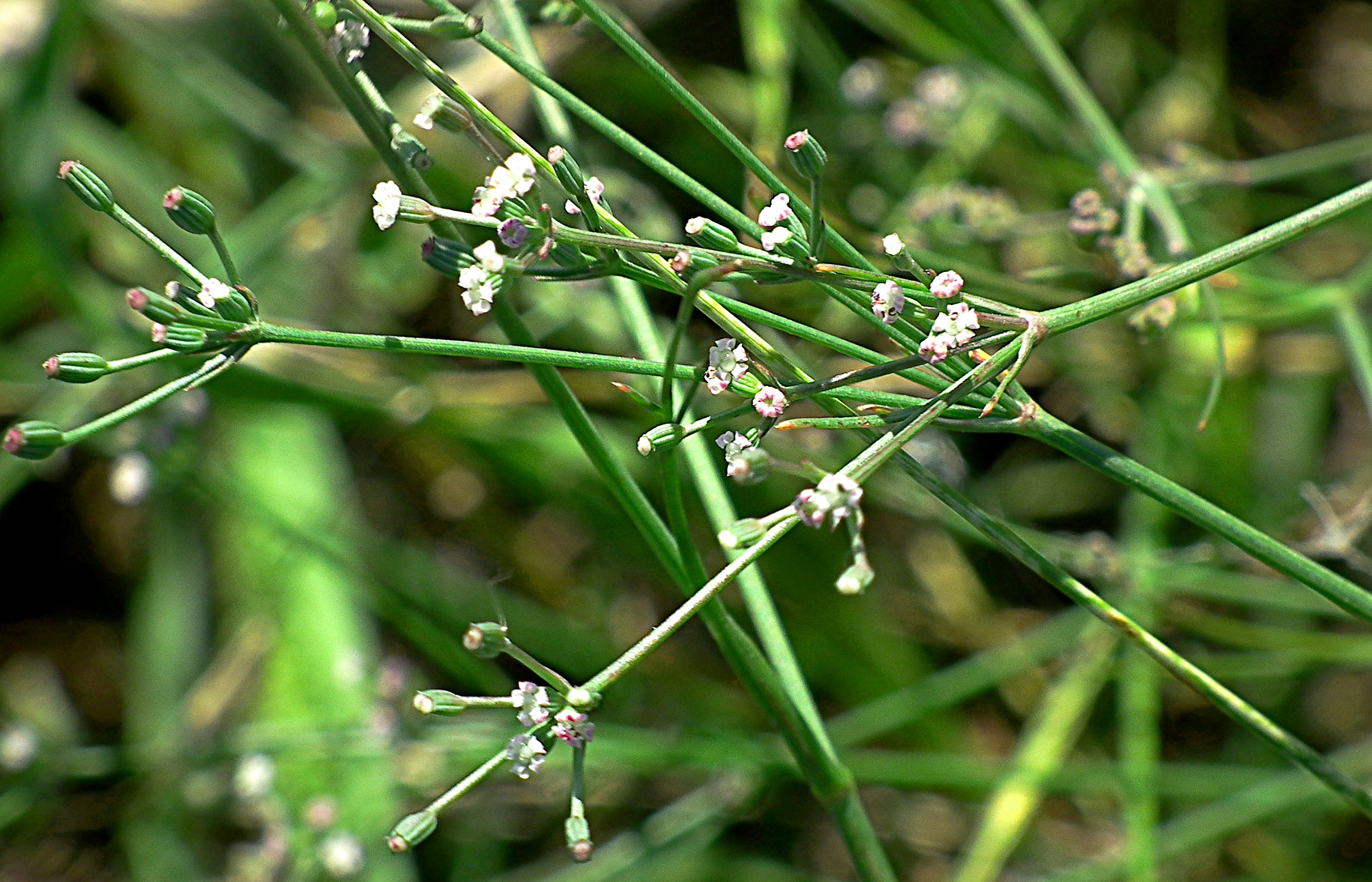
- Sison segetum

Scientific classification
- Kingdom: Plantae
- Clade: Tracheophytes
- Clade: Angiosperms
- Clade: Eudicots
- Clade: Asterids
- Order: Apiales
- Family: Apiaceae
- Subfamily: Apioideae
- Tribe: Pyramidoptereae
- Genus: Sison; L.

Species
- See text

= Sison (plant) =

Genus of plants

Sison is a genus of flowering plant in the family Apiaceae, native to western and southern Europe and north Africa. The genus was first described by Carl Linnaeus in 1753, in his book Species Plantarum.

== Species ==
As of December 2022, Plants of the World Online accepted the following species:

- Sison amomum L.
- Sison scaligerioides
- Sison exaltatum Boiss.
- Sison segetum L.
- Sison trinervium
