= Philipsson =

Philipsson is a surname. Notable people with the surname include:

- Anette Philipsson (born 1965), former Swedish Olympic swimmer
- Lena Philipsson (born 1966), Swedish singer and media personality

== See also ==
- Philipson
