= The Rowett Institute =

Research institute in Aberdeen, Scotland

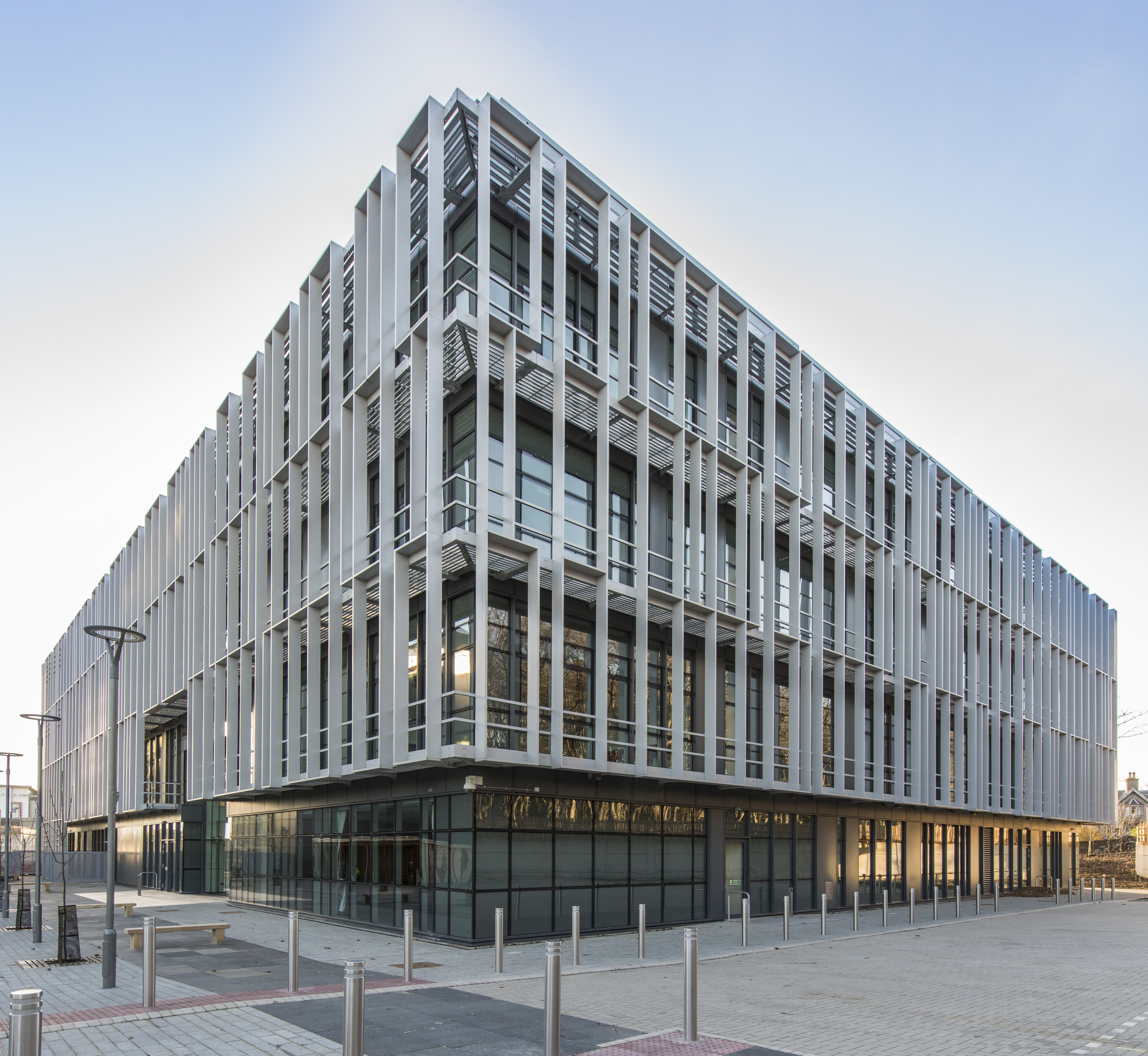
Exterior of the new building on the Foresterhill Health Campus (2015)

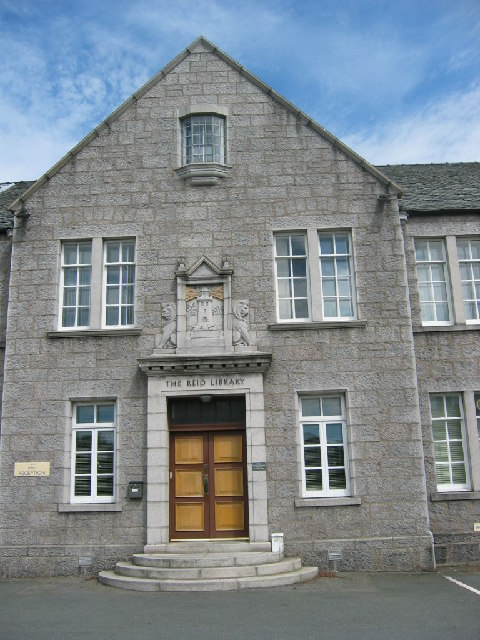
The Reid Library at the old Bucksburn site (2005)

The Rowett Institute is a research centre for studies into food and nutrition, located in Aberdeen, Scotland.

== History ==
The institute was founded in 1913 when the University of Aberdeen and the North of Scotland College of Agriculture agreed that an "Institute for Research into Animal Nutrition" should be established in Scotland. The first director was John Boyd Orr, later to become Lord Boyd Orr, who moved from Glasgow to "the wilds of Aberdeenshire" in 1914. Orr drew up some plans for a nutrition research institute. Orr also donated £5,000 for the building of a granite laboratory building at Craibstone, not far from the Bucksburn site of the Rowett.

At the breakout of the Great War, Orr left the institute, but returned in 1919 with a staff of four to begin work in the new laboratory. Orr continued to push for a new research institute and finally the Government agreed to pay half the costs but stipulated that the other half was to be found from other sources. The extra money was donated by Dr John Quiller Rowett, a businessman and director of a wine and spirits merchants in London.

Rowett's donation allowed the purchase of 41 acres of land for the institute to be built on. Rowett also contributed £10,000 towards the cost of the buildings. The money was donated with one very important stipulation from Rowett—"if any work done at the institute on animal nutrition were found to have a bearing on human nutrition, the institute would be allowed to follow up this work." The institute was formally opened in 1922 by Queen Mary.

In 1927, the Rowett was given £5,000 to carry out an investigation to test whether health could be improved by the consumption of milk. After some further tests on other groups, a bill was passed in the House of Commons enabling local authorities in Scotland to provide cheap or free milk to all school children. It was soon applied in England too. This helped reduce the surplus of milk at the time and also helped rescue the milk industry which was in danger of collapsing.

In 1936, Orr published Food, Health and Income, showing that the cost of a diet fulfilling basic nutritional requirements was beyond the means of half the British population and that ten per cent of the population was undernourished. Following on from this first study, the Carnegie survey (supported by the Carnegie UK Trust) began in 1937 and surveyed nearly 8,000 people in 16 locations, the largest study attempted in the UK relating diet and health.

War broke out just after the study was completed in 1939, but the results of the Carnegie survey were crucial to help implement a wartime food policy.

On 1 July 2008, the institute merged with the University of Aberdeen to become The Rowett Institute of Nutrition and Health, College of Life Sciences and Medicine.

In March 2016, the institute relocated to a purpose-built building at the university's Medical School campus at Foresterhill, Aberdeen. The Bucksburn site was demolished over late 2016 and early 2017 to make way for what is now the P&J Live. The new building won both Project of the Year, and Public Realm / Landscape in the 2017 annual design awards by the Aberdeen Society of Architects.

== Notable alumni ==
- Winifred Margaret Dean, prolific translator of German scientific texts into English
- Peter Joseph Heald, known for his research on reproductive biochemistry
- Ainsley Iggo, known for demonstrating electrical recording from individual C fibres in the human body; president of the International Association for the Study of Pain (IASP) (1981–84)
- Nicole Roy, professor of human nutrition in New Zealand

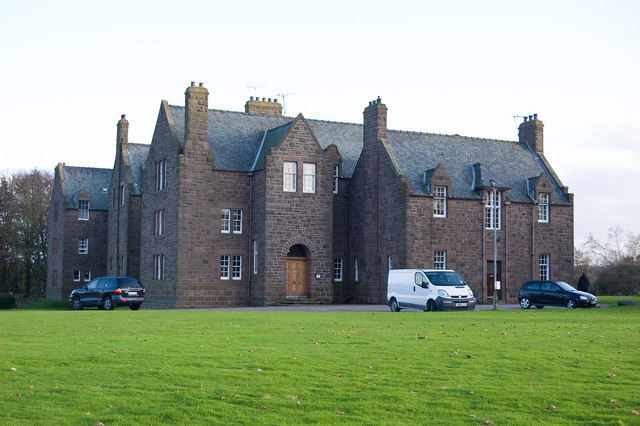
Strathcona House (2009)

== Staff ==
- Kenneth Blaxter, director from 1965 until 1982
- David Cutbertson, world-leading authority on metabolism; director from 1945 until 1965
- Asim K. Duttaroy, professor at the institute from 1990 to 2001; currently professor of clinical nutrition at the University of Oslo
- John Boyd Orr, director from 1914 to 1945; recipient of a Nobel Peace Prize for his research into nutrition and work as first director-general of the United Nations Food and Agriculture Organization
- A. T. Phillipson, head of physiology from 1947 to 1963 and deputy director from 1952
- Richard Laurence Millington Synge, researcher at the institute from 1948 to 1967; recipient of a Nobel Prize in Chemistry for the invention of partition chromatography
