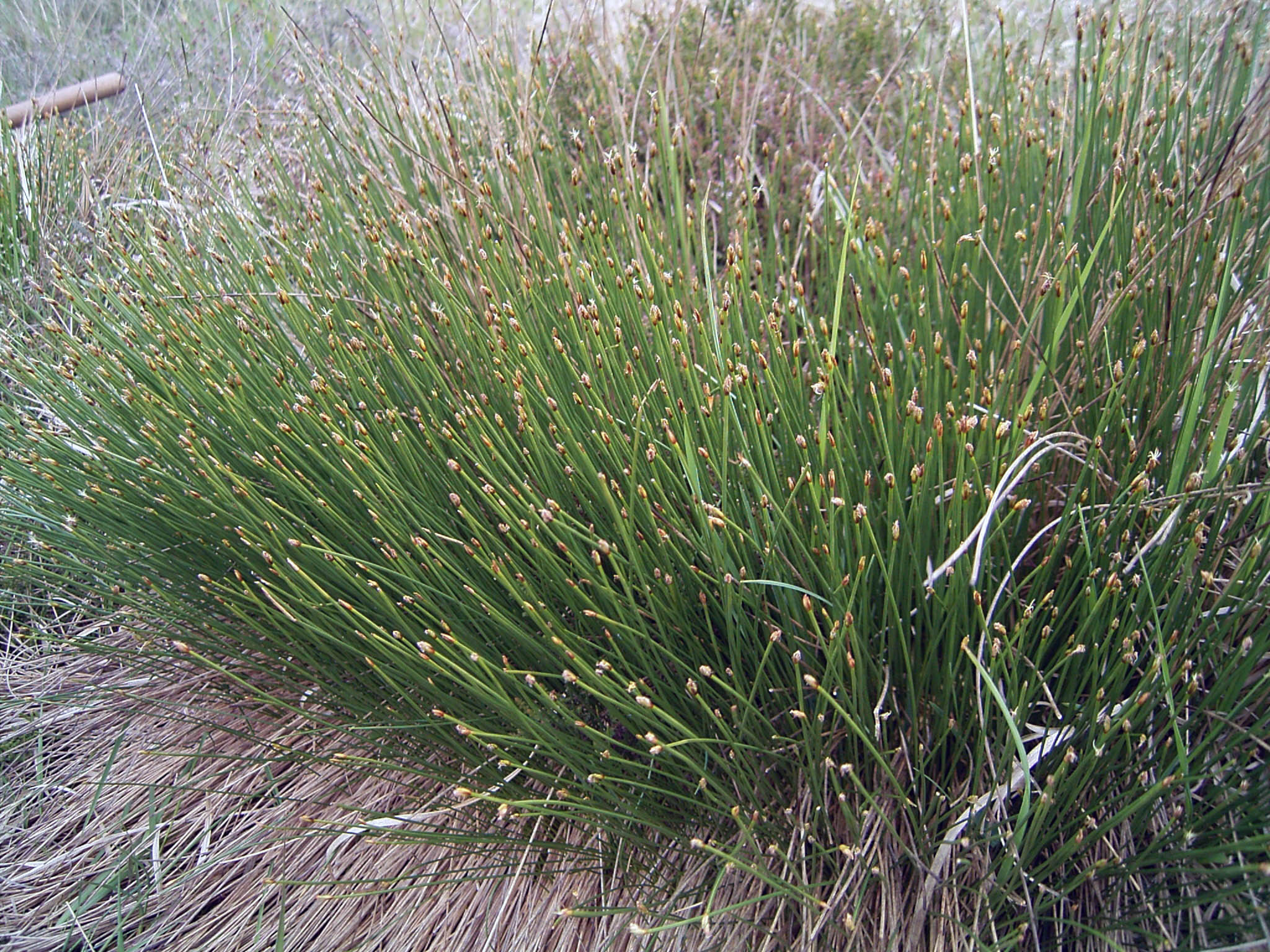

Scientific classification
- Kingdom: Plantae
- Clade: Embryophytes
- Clade: Tracheophytes
- Clade: Angiosperms
- Clade: Monocots
- Clade: Commelinids
- Order: Poales
- Family: Cyperaceae
- Genus: Trichophorum
- Species: T. cespitosum

Binomial name
- Trichophorum cespitosum (L.) Hartm.

Subspecies
- Trichophorum cespitosum subsp. cespitosum; Trichophorum cespitosum nothosubsp. foersteri Swan; Trichophorum cespitosum subsp. germanicum (Palla) Hegi

Synonyms
- List: Baeothryon cespitosum (L.) A.Dietr.; Clavula cespitosa (L.) Dumort.; Eleocharis cespitosa (L.) Link; Kreczetoviczia cespitosa (L.) Tzvelev; Limnochloa cespitosa (L.) Rchb.; Scirpus cespitosus L.

= Trichophorum cespitosum =

Species of flowering plant in the sedge family

Trichophorum cespitosum, commonly known as deergrass or tufted bulrush, is a species of flowering plant in the sedge family. It was originally described by the Swedish naturalist Carl Linnaeus in 1753 as Scirpus cespitosus, but was transferred to the genus Trichophorum by the Swedish botanist Carl Johan Hartman in 1849, becoming Trichophorum cespitosum.

== Description ==
Trichophorum cespitosum is a densely tufted perennial sedge often growing gregariously. The wiry stems are round in cross section and slightly ridged, and grow up to 1 ft (30 cm) long. The leaves are reduced to several pointed sheaths at the base of the stem. The blade of the uppermost sheath is longer than that of the few-flowered spike-rush (Eleocharis quinqueflora), an otherwise similar plant, which has a small squarish upper leaf blade. The brownish inflorescence is a very small, narrow terminal head, with the basal pointed, ribbed green glume the same length as the rest of the head. The fruit is an ovoid, three-sided nut 2 mm (0.08 in) in diameter.

== Distribution and habitat ==
Trichophorum cespitosum has a circum-boreal montane distribution. In the British Isles it occurs in Scotland, Northwest England, Wales, Southwest England and most of Ireland, thinning out in Southeastern England. It grows in wet acidic soils and peats, in bogs, moorland and wet heaths, persisting even in burnt areas and where grazing pressure by deer is high. It grows from sea level to at least 1,190 m (3,900 ft) in Britain, above Caenlochan in Angus. It is a common species, growing abundantly in suitable conditions.

== Ecology ==
Flatter mires in the Alps and other montane regions are often dominated by deergrass and cottongrass (Eriophorum angustifolium), forming a community that turns brown in winter. It only grows at the margins of active bogs, being dominated by sphagnum moss (Sphagnum spp.) in the raised central areas, but becomes dominant itself when drainage is undertaken. In wet heathland it may be associated with heather (Calluna vulgaris) and purple moor grass (Molinia caerulea), and provide grazing for deer, cattle and sheep.
