= Trichophorum clementis =

Scientific classification
- Kingdom: Plantae
- Clade: Tracheophytes
- Clade: Angiosperms
- Clade: Monocots
- Clade: Commelinids
- Order: Poales
- Family: Cyperaceae
- Genus: Trichophorum
- Species: T. clementis

Binomial name
- Trichophorum clementis (M.E. Jones) S.G. Sm.

Species of flowering plant in the sedge family Cyperaceae

Trichophorum clementis (syn. Scirpus clementis) is a species of flowering plant in the sedge family known by the common name Yosemite bulrush. It is endemic to the Sierra Nevada of California, where it is known from high-elevation mountain meadows and streambanks.

== Description ==
It is a perennial herb forming a dense tuft of erect, ridged stems up to 12 centimeters (4.7 in) tall. There are a few short, thick, hairlike leaves at the base. At the tip of each stem is the inflorescence, a clublike spikelet less than a centimeter long which is composed of a few tiny flowers. The flowers produce smooth dark fruits that are achenes no more than 2 millimeters (0.079 in) long.
