= Trichophorum clintonii =

Scientific classification
- Kingdom: Plantae
- Clade: Tracheophytes
- Clade: Angiosperms
- Clade: Monocots
- Clade: Commelinids
- Order: Poales
- Family: Cyperaceae
- Genus: Trichophorum
- Species: T. clintonii

Binomial name
- Trichophorum clintonii (A. Gray) S.G. Sm

Synonyms
- Baeothryon clintonii (A. Gray) Á. Löve & D. Löve; Scirpus clintonii A. Gray

Species of flowering plant in the sedge family

Trichophorum clintonii, the Clinton's bulrush, is a plant species native to Canada and the northeastern United States. It has been reported from Alberta, Saskatchewan, Ontario, Québec, New Brunswick, Maine, New York State, Michigan, Wisconsin, and Minnesota.

Trichophorum clintonii is a perennial herb up to 40 centimeters (16 in) tall, forming dense clumps but without rhizomes. Culms are triangular in cross-section. Leaves are up to 25 centimeters (9.8 in) long. The inflorescences is one brown spikelet with three to six flowers. Achenes are flattened triangles about 2 millimeters (0.079 in) long.
