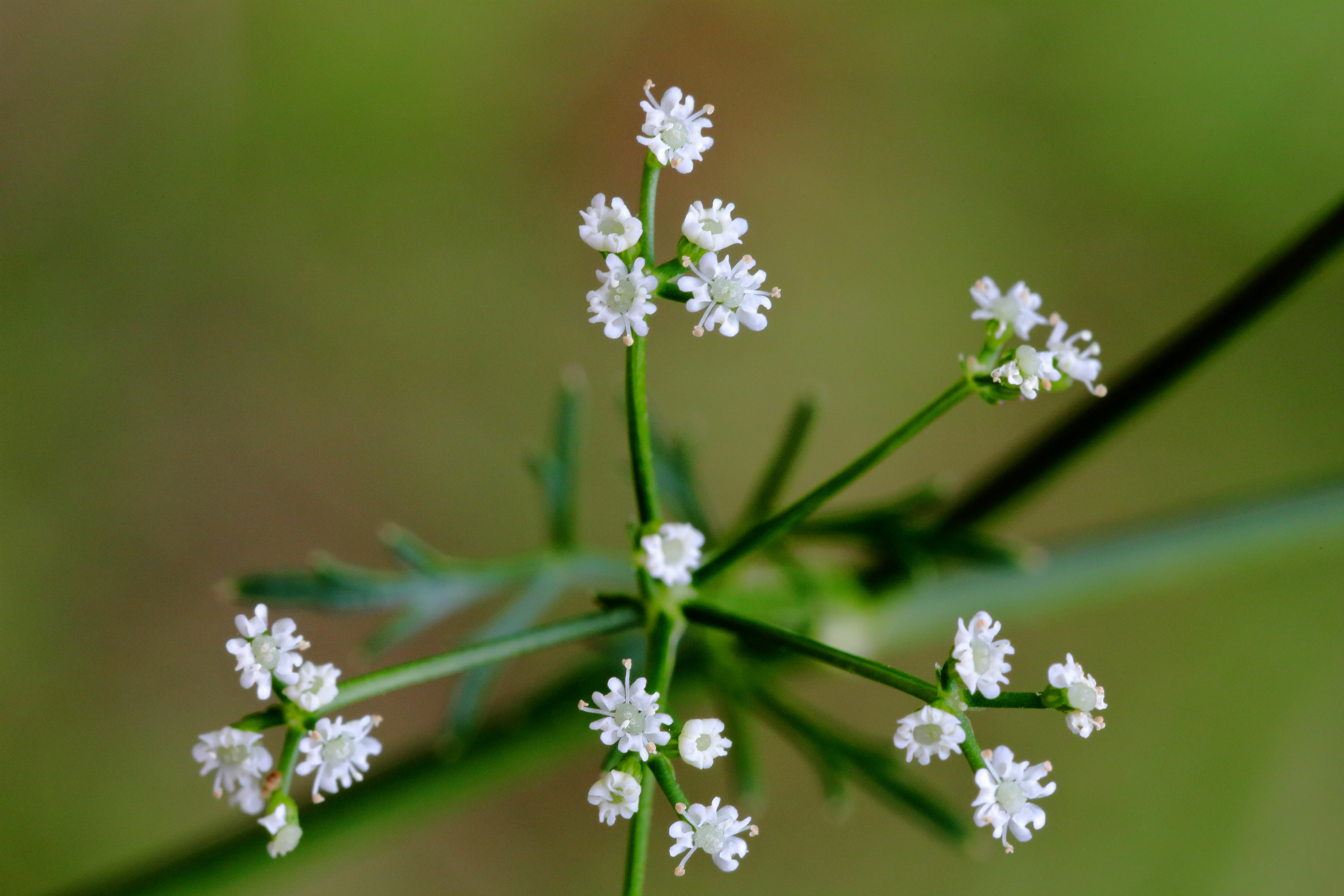
- Close up of a flower umbel

Scientific classification
- Kingdom: Plantae
- Clade: Embryophytes
- Clade: Tracheophytes
- Clade: Angiosperms
- Clade: Eudicots
- Clade: Asterids
- Order: Apiales
- Family: Apiaceae
- Genus: Sison
- Species: S. amomum

Binomial name
- Sison amomum Carl Linnaeus; Species Plantarum (1753)
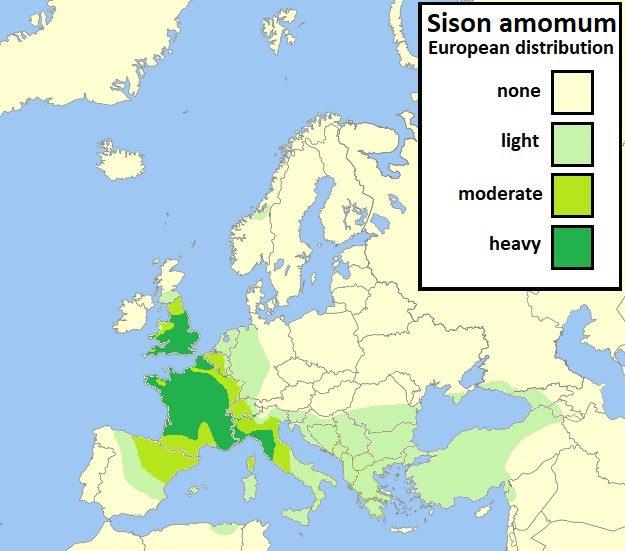
- European range of Sison amomum

Synonyms
- Apium amomum Stokes (1812); Apium catalaunicum Thell. & Calest. (1905); Carum amomum Koso-Pol. (1915); Cicuta amomum Crantz (1767); Pimpinella gracilis catalaunica Reutera albiflora Costa (1877); Reutera gracilis catalaunica Seseli amomum Scop. (1771); Sison amomum catalaunicum Hegi (1926); Sison amomus St.-Lag (1880); Sison aromaticum Sison erectum Salisb. (1796); Sison heterophyllum Moench (1784); Sium amomum Roth (1789); Sium aromaticum Lam. (1779)

= Sison amomum =

Stone parsley

Species of plant

Sison amomum is one of several species of plant in the genus of Sison, its common name is stone parsley and it is native to Western and Southern Europe, North Africa and Turkey. The species and genus are flowering plants in the family Apiaceae, both of which were first described by Carl Linnaeus, in his book Species Plantarum, originally published in 1753. The plant has many synonyms, having also subsequently been described by other botanists, after Linnaeus, including Jean-Baptiste Lamarck, Richard Anthony Salisbury, Conrad Moench, Emanuel Mendes da Costa, and Albert Thellung among others.

Stone parsley is an erect hairless plant, and produces a foul odour if crushed. The species usually reaches between 30 and 70 cm (12 and 28 in) in height, although it can grow up to 1 m (3.3 ft). The plant has thin, solid and striated stems which branch profusely and it produces small globular fruit around in 3 mm (0.12 in) diametre. Stone parsley has tiny white flowers, usually 1 to 3 mm (0.039 to 0.118 in) in size, with a green patch in the centre. The flowers grow on long stalks of different lengths, in umbels up to 4 cm (1.6 in) wide. The flowers usually have five irregular, notched petals, five stamen, and two short styles but do not grow sepals, they usually come to bloom between July and September. The species has between two and four short linear bracts, which emerge from below the umbels and up to four bracteole. The roots, leaves, and seeds of the plant are edible, and have historically been used for food, the seeds can be used to produce condiments. The larva of several insect species, mostly moths, are parasites to the plant, often in the form of leaf miners.

Stone parsley is found in rough grassland, grassy banks, beside roads, railways, paths and hedgerows, often in waste grounds, disturbed ground and on heavy soil. The species was first recorded in Southern France, near the Mediterranean Sea, then across France and Great Britain by the late eighteenth century, followed by Spain and Belgium by the nineteenth century. By the twentieth century it was recorded in Italy, Germany, Algeria the Balkans, the Caucasus, Mediterranean islands of Sicily, Corsica, Sardinia and the Balearics and had also been introduced into New Zealand. In the twenty-first century it has also been recorded in Switzerland and Norway.

== Taxonomy ==
Sison amomum is one of several species in the genus of Sison, along with Sison exaltatum, Sison segetum, Sison trinervium, and Sison scaligerioides. The species and genus are flowering plants in the family Apiaceae, native to western and southern Europe and north Africa. They were first described by Carl Linnaeus, in his book Species Plantarum, originally published on 1 May 1753, which listed every plant species known at the time, classified into genera. The plant was known about before being formally described, it is mentioned by the name stone parsley in the 1684 book Aristotle's Masterpiece, which claims it is useful for "cleansing the womb", suggesting it may have been used as an abortifacient.

== Name and synonyms ==
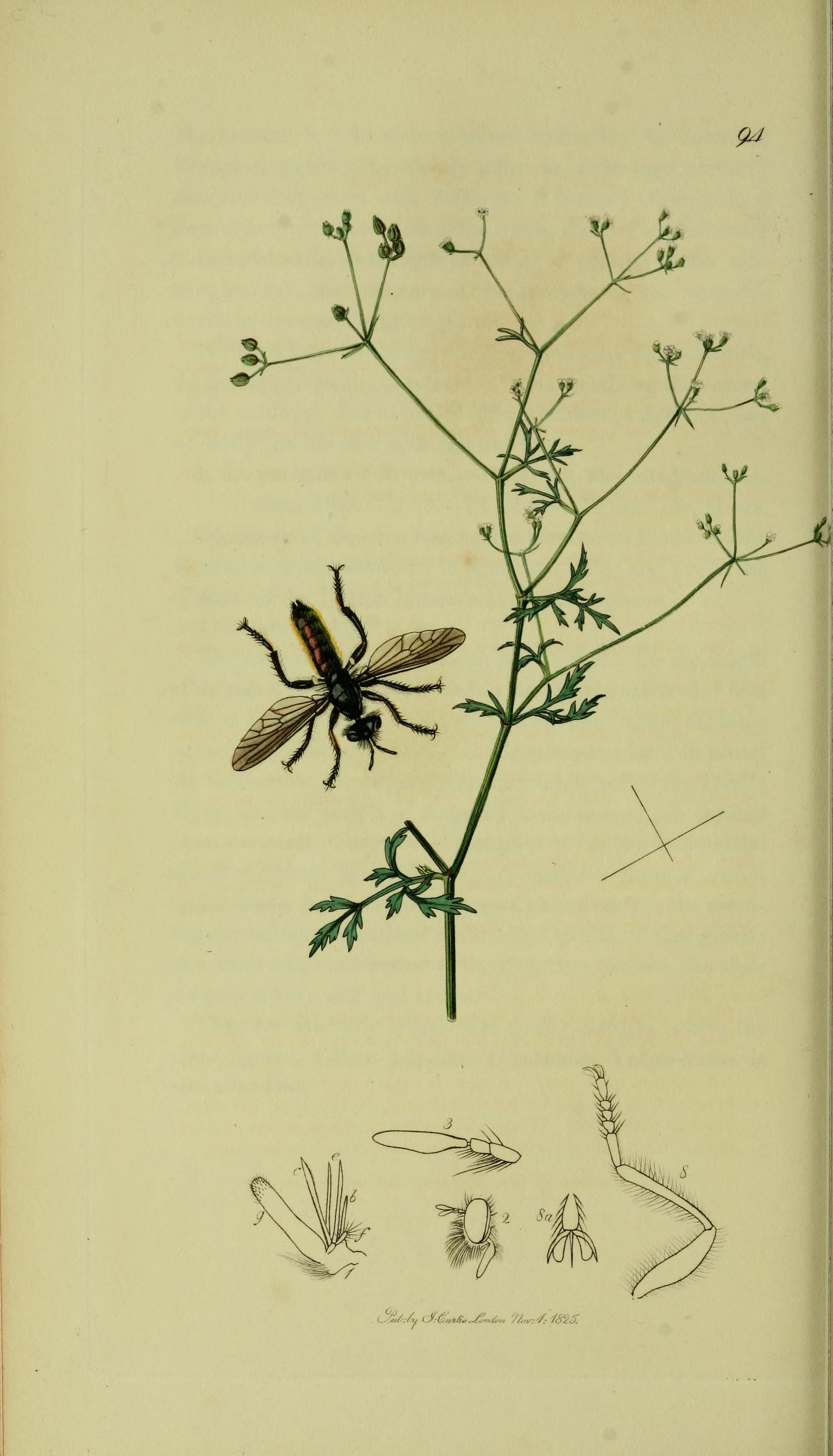
Illustration of a robber fly with the plant by John Curtis from his book British Entomology published between 1824 and 1840, he refers to the plant species as Sison amomum and Bastard Stone Parsley

The species’ binomial name is Sison amomum, its common name is stone parsley. The binomial name was used by Carl Linnaeus, in his 1753 book Species Plantarum, which was the first to describe the plant species among many others. The plant has also been referred to as bastard stone parsley, such as by John Curtis, in his book British Entomology published between 1824 and 1840. Another plant species, Cryptotaenia japonica is also known as stone parsley among many other names, it too is a member of the Apiaceae family with small white flowers, like Sison amomum, but it is native to East Asia. Seseli, a different plant genus of around 140 species, also in the Apiacaea family, is sometimes referred to by the name stone parsley too.

=== Synonyms ===
The plant has many synonyms, including, Apium amomum, Sium aromaticum, Carum amomum, Cicuta amomum, Pimpinella gracilis catalaunica, Reutera albiflora, Reutera gracilis catalaunica, Seseli amomum, Sison amomum catalaunicum, Sison aromaticum, Sison erectum, Sison heterophyllum, and Sium amomum.

Homotypic synonyms that have been used to describe the species include Cicuta amomum by Heinrich Johann Nepomuk von Crantz in Classis cruciformium emendata cum figuris aeneis in necessarium instit. rei herbariae supplementum in 1767, Seseli amomum by Giovanni Antonio Scopoli in Flora Carniolica in 1771, Sium amomum by Albrecht Wilhelm Roth in Tentamen florae germanicae in 1789, Apium amomum by Jonathan Stokes in A Botanical Materia Medica in 1812, and Carum amomum by Boris Kozo-Polyansky in New principle of biology. Essay on the Theory of Symbiogenesis, Moscow in 1915.

Heterotypic synonyms that have been used to describe stone parsley include Sium aromaticum by Jean-Baptiste Lamarck in Flore françoise, ou, Description succincte de toutes les plantes qui croissent naturellement en France in 1779, Sison erectum by Richard Anthony Salisbury in Prodromus stirpium in horto ad Chapel Allerton vigentium in 1796, Sison heterophyllum by Conrad Moench in Methodus plantas horti botanici et agri Marburgensis: a staminum situ describendi in 1794, Reutera gracilis var. catalaunica by Emanuel Mendes da Costa in 1864 and 1874, Reutera albiflora by Emanuel Mendes da Costa in 1877, Sison amomus by Jean Baptiste Saint-Lager in 1880, Apium catalaunicum by Albert Thellung and Vittorio Calestani in Contributo alla sistematica della Ombrellifere D'Europa, Webbia in 1905 and Sison amomum var. catalaunicum Gustav Hegi in 1926.

=== Name in other languages ===
In addition to stone parsley in English, Sison amomum has several different common names or alternative names in many other European languages, from regions were the species is native, several of them refer to the plant's odour.

== Description ==
Sison amomum is an erect hairless plant, its stem is solid with fine ridges, and it produces a foul odour if crushed, which has been described as smelling like petrol or nutmeg. The species can grow up to 1 m (3.3 ft) in height, although 30 to 70 cm (12 to 28 in) is more common. The stems which branch profusely, are quite thin for the plant's height, have a slight sheath at each junction, and are solid and striated. The fruit are globular, and ridged, being about 3 mm (0.12 in) in diameter when ripe. The stone parsley is a biennial plant, and in Britain it usually flowers between July and August, but sometimes as late as September. Despite its foul odour, the roots, leaves, and seeds of the plant are edible, and have historically been used for food, it has been described as a herb, and the seeds can be used to produce condiments.

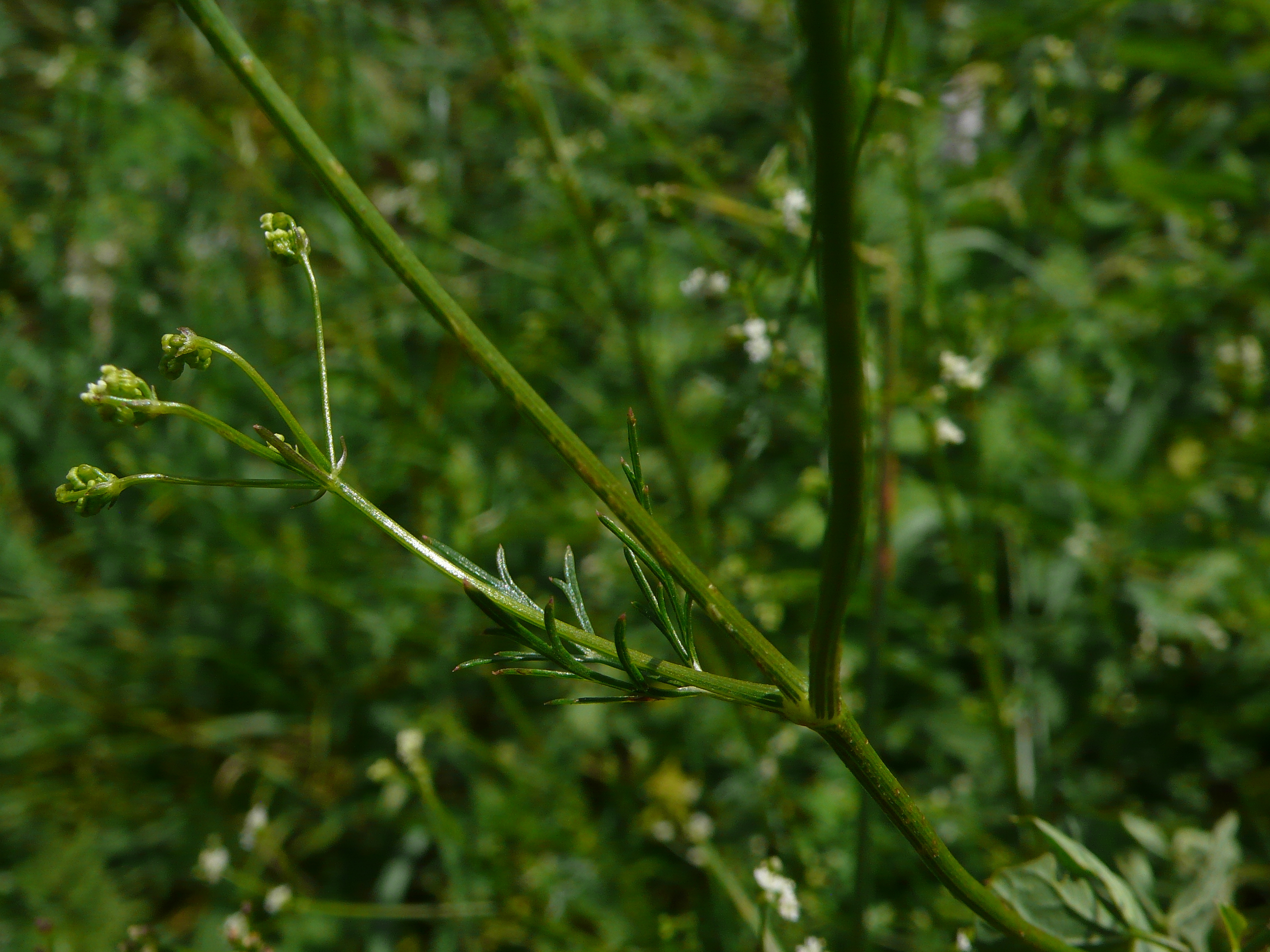
plant stem

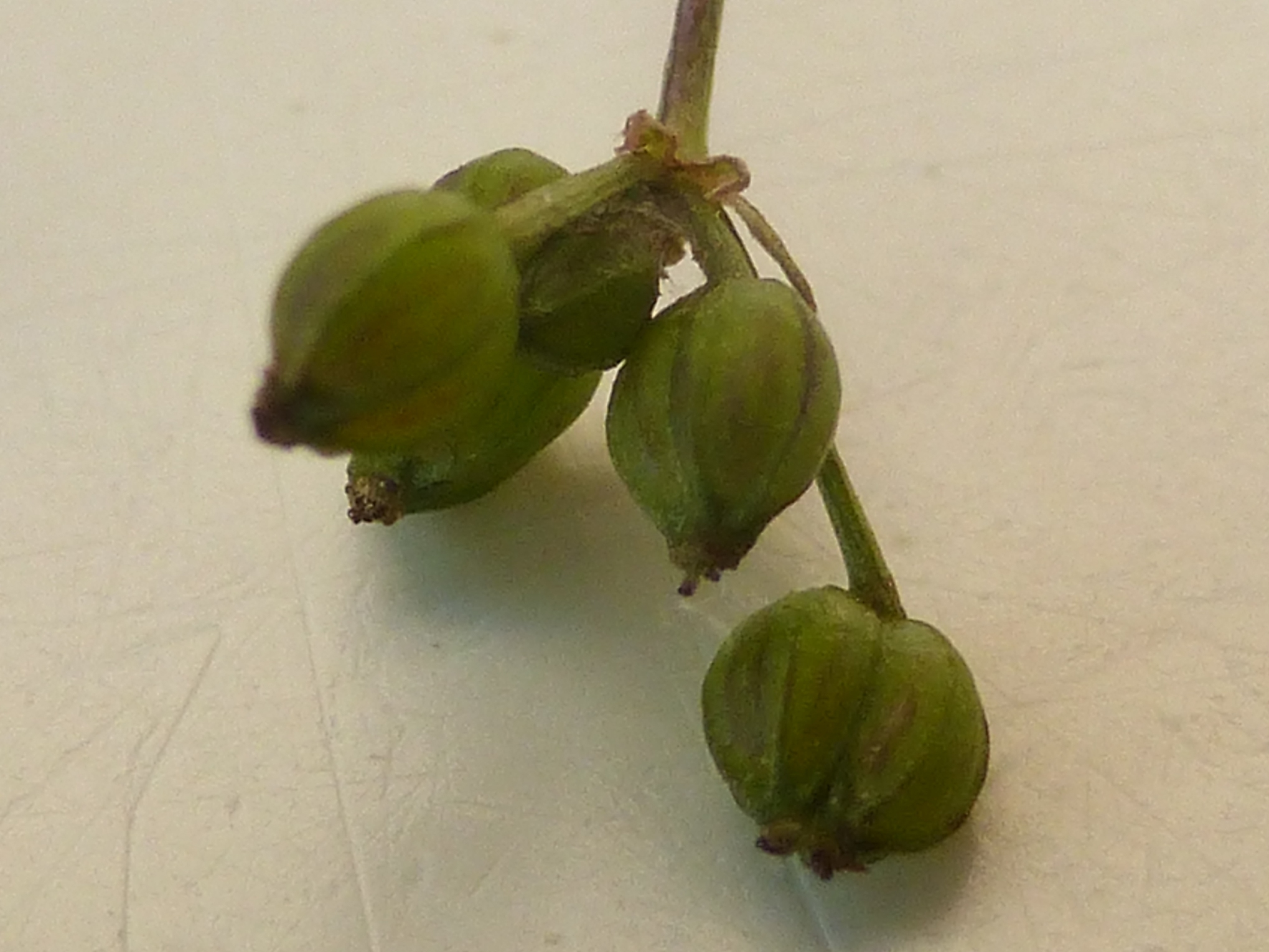
fruit

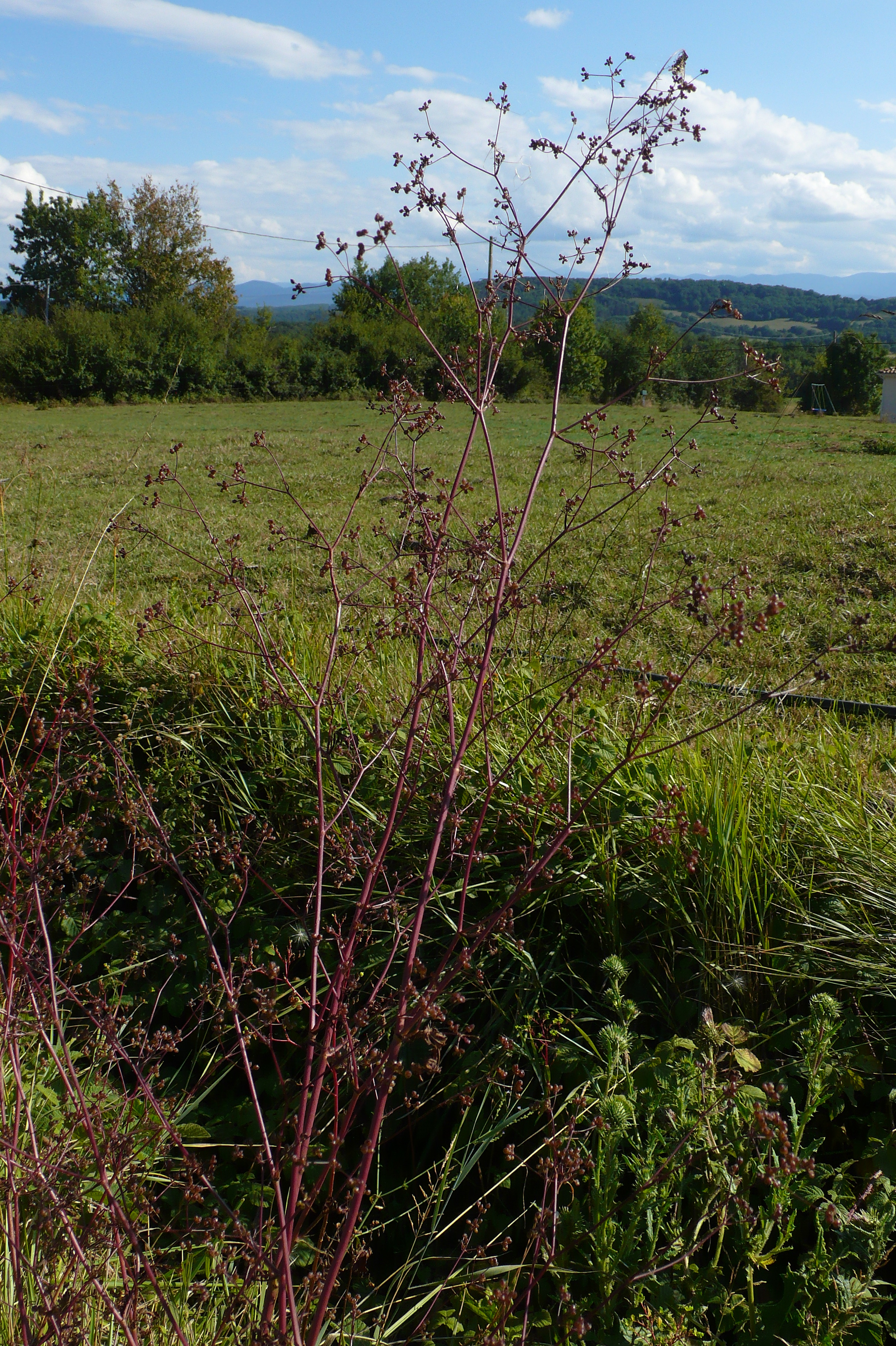
full size

=== Flowers ===
Stone parsley has tiny white flowers, usually 1 to 2 mm (0.039 to 0.079 in) in size, sometimes up 3 mm (0.12 in) in size, with a green patch in the centre. The flowers grow on long stalks of different lengths, in umbels of between three and six smooth rays, which can grow up to 3 cm (1.2 in), or sometimes 4 cm (1.6 in) wide. The flowers usually have five petals, which are notched, and irregular in shape, five stamen, and two short styles, but do not grow sepals.

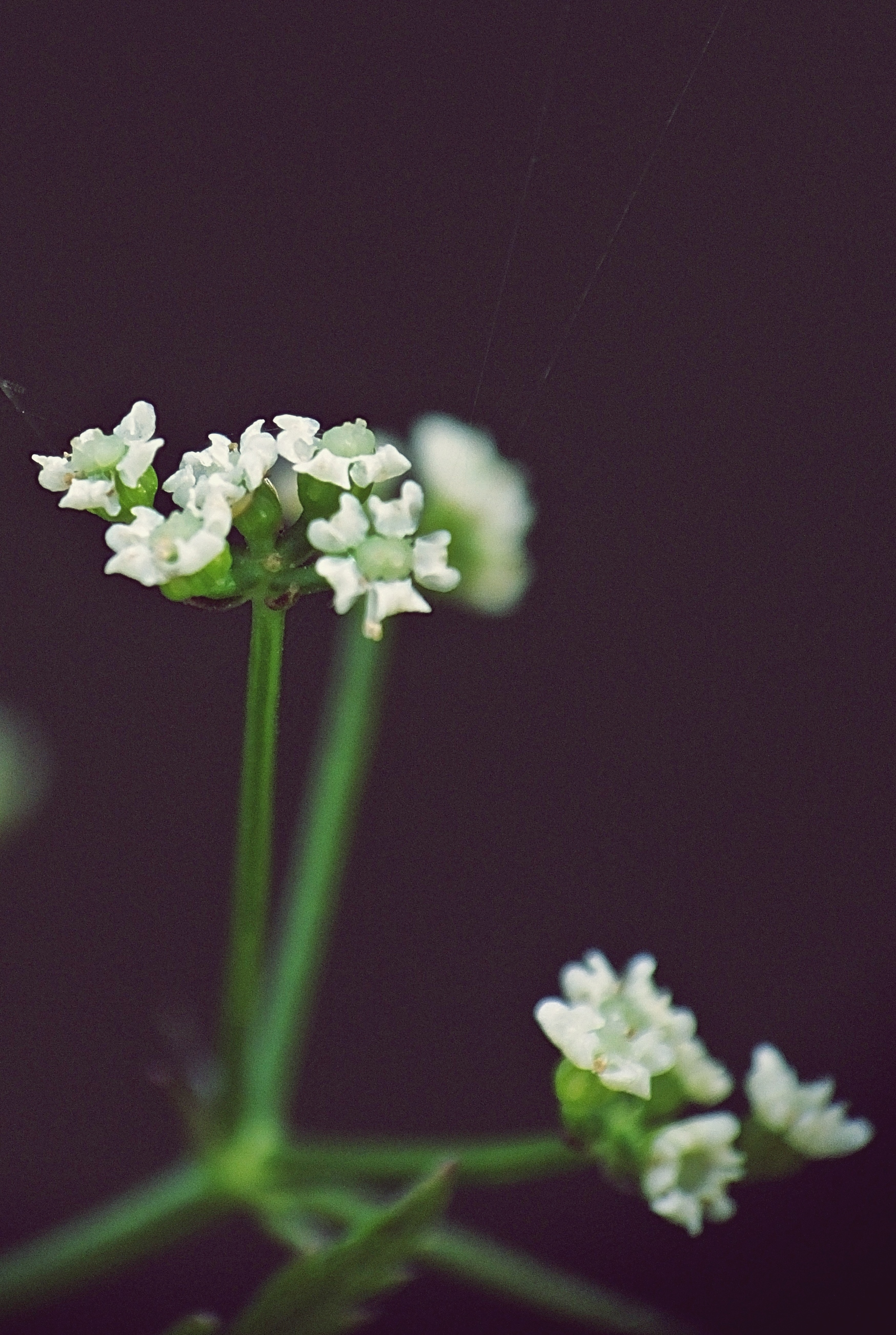

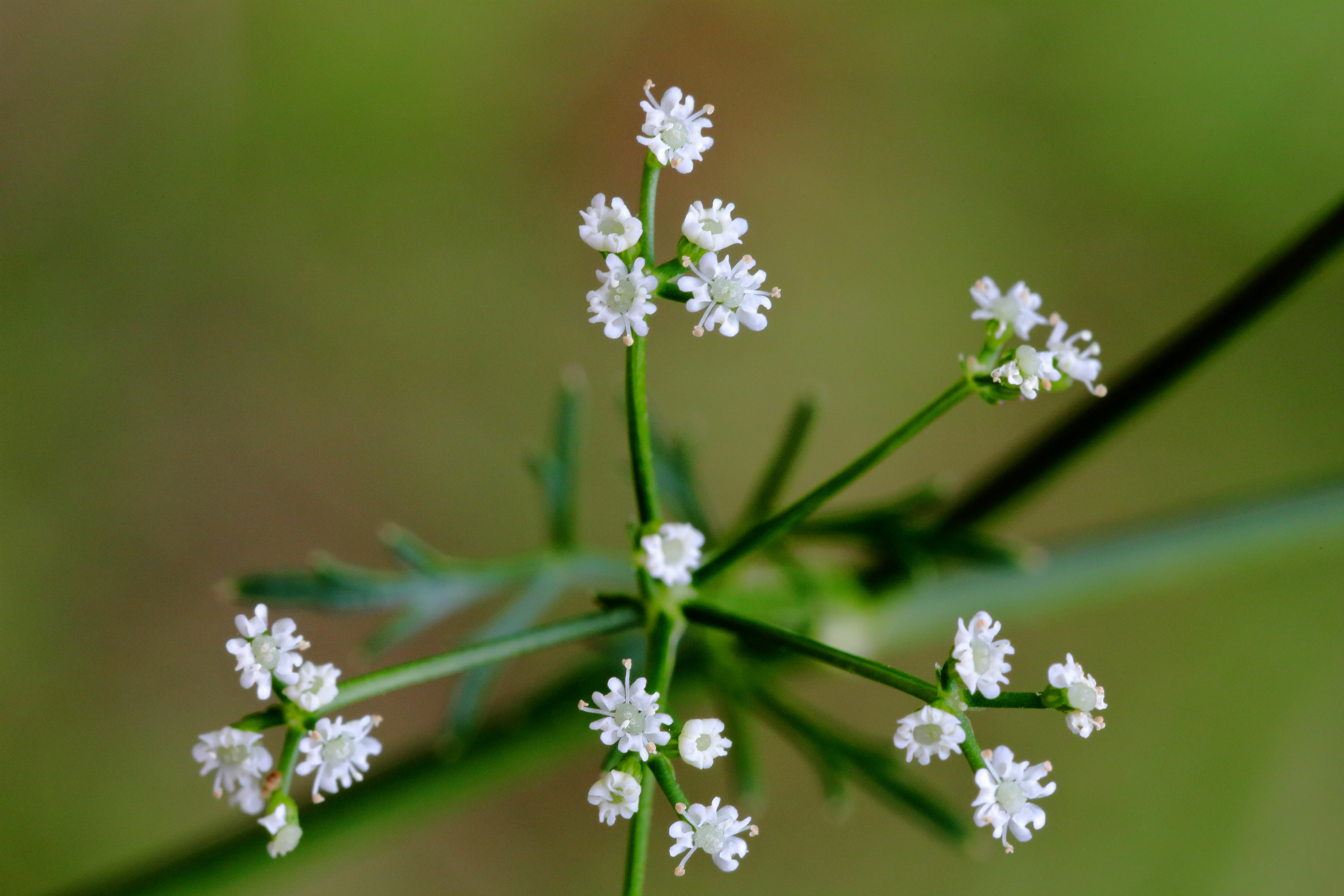
flowers

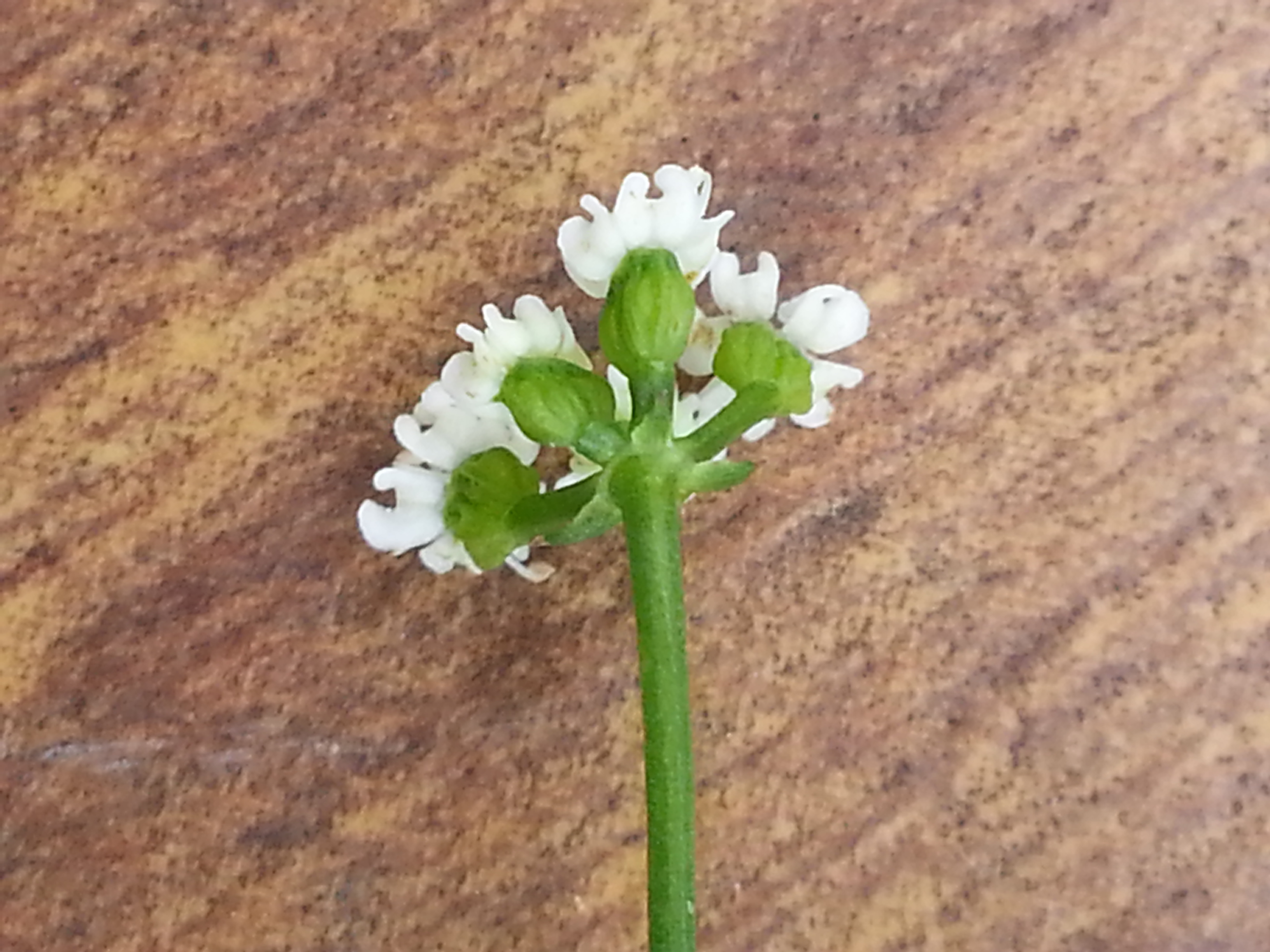

=== Leaves ===
The plant has pinnate leaves arranged in five to nine pairs of rectangular toothed leaflets. The leaves are often lobed, lanceolate toward the end, and are hairless on widely branched stems. The leaves nearer the bottom of the plant are usually larger than those near the top and can grow from 6 cm (2.4 in) to 20 cm (7.9 in) in length, and are imparipinnate. When they wither the leaves can turn from green to purple before they fall off. The smaller leaflets nearer the top of the plant are attached by short petiole, and are oval to lanceolate and serrate, having teeth with forward curving points. The species has short linear bracts, usually between two and four which emerge from below the umbels, and up to four bracteole.

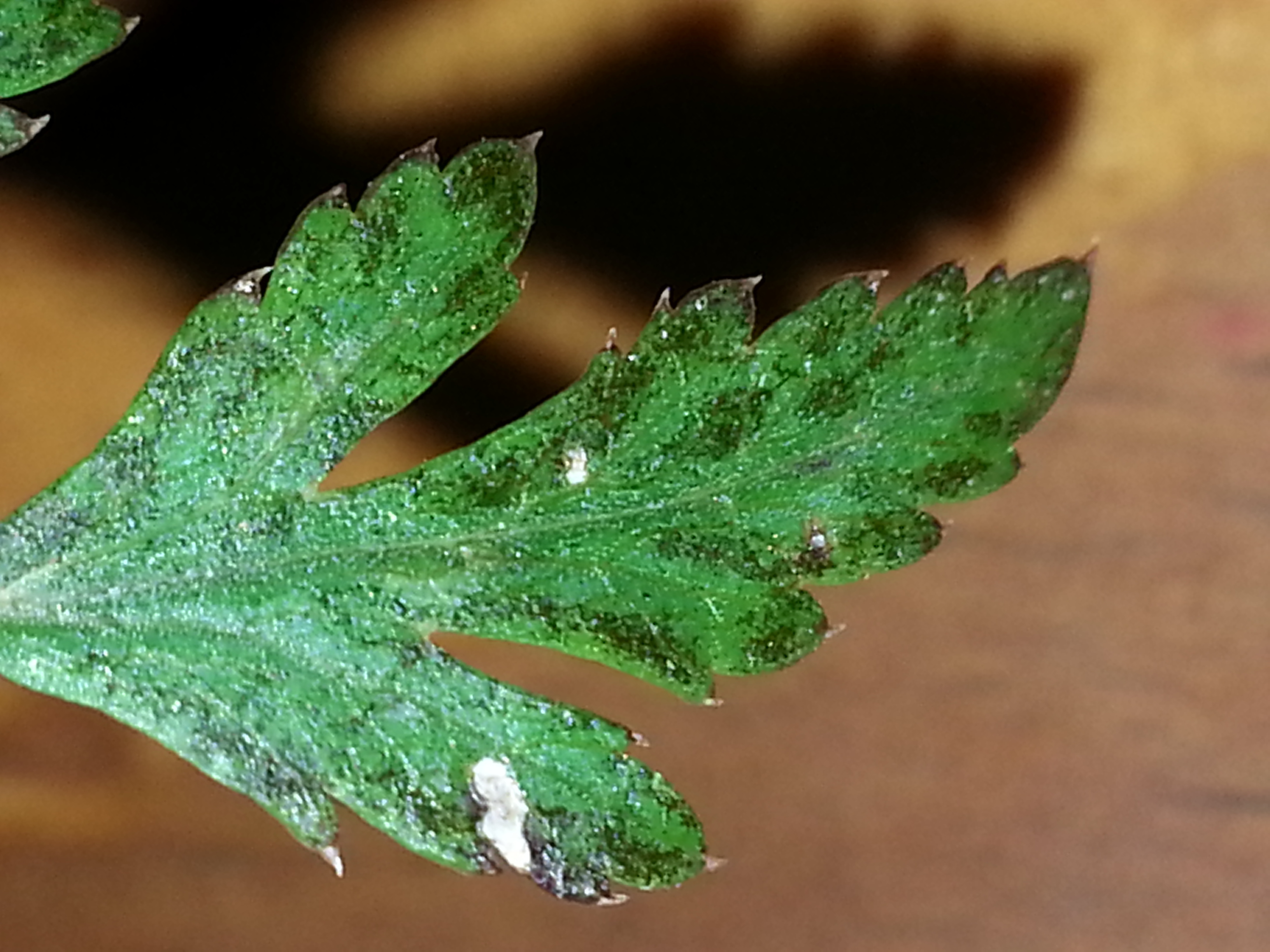

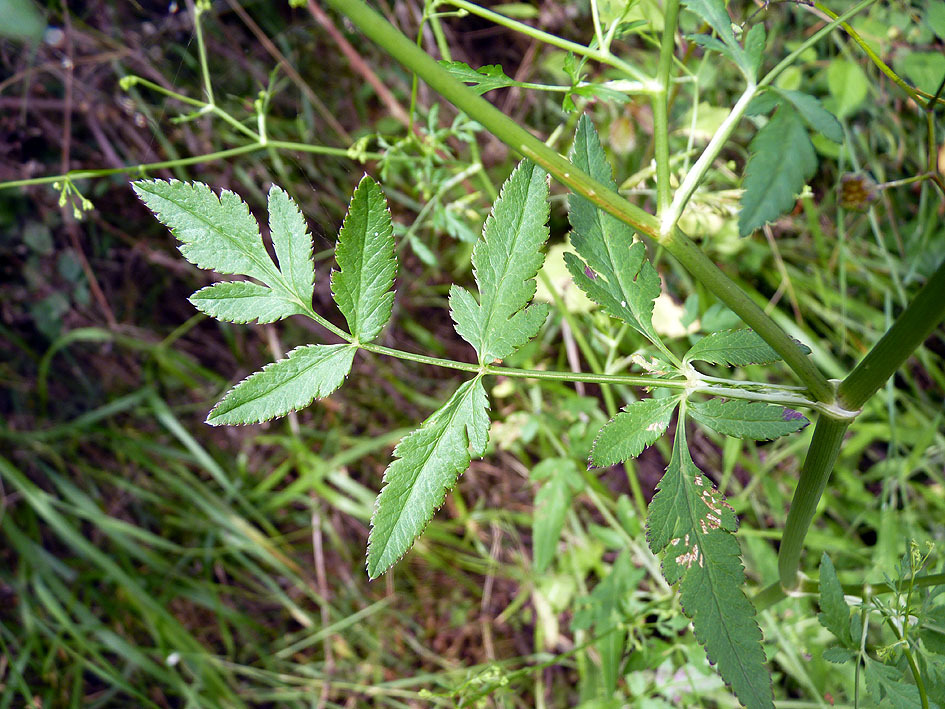
leaves

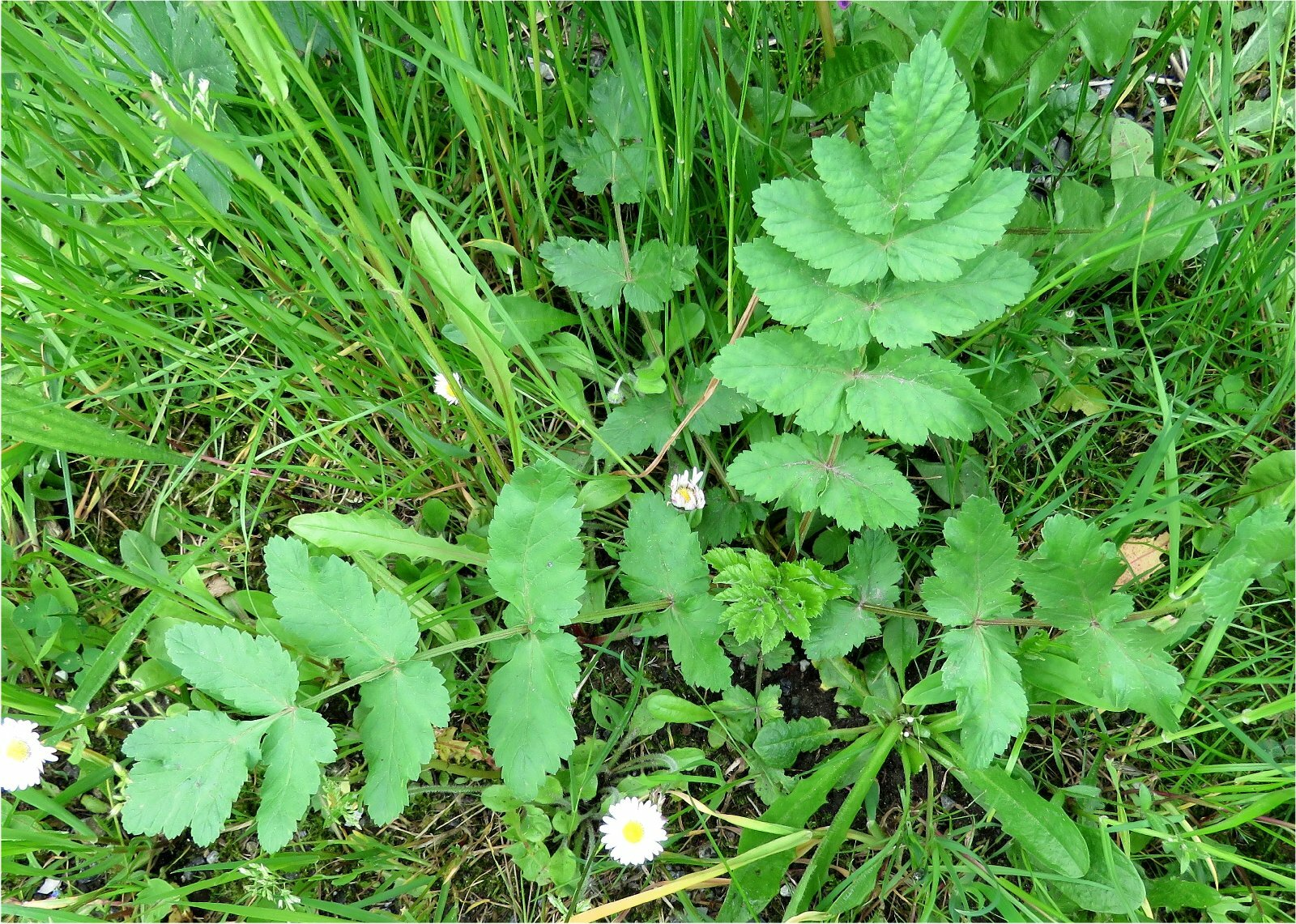

== Distribution and habitat ==
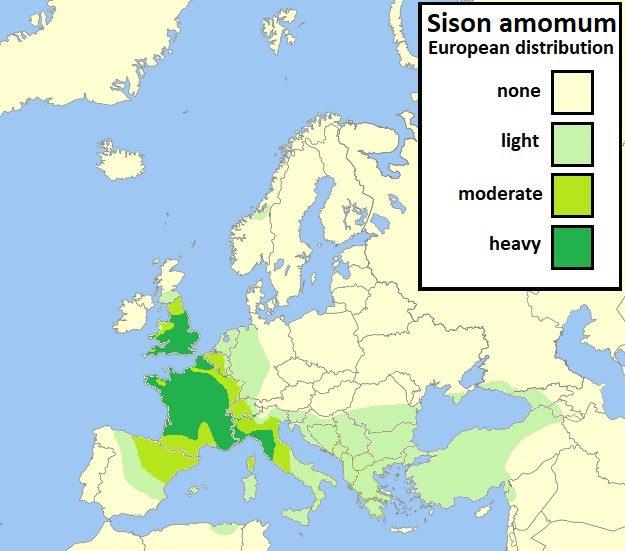
Map of Europe showing the present distribution of the plant species Sison amomum

Stone parsley is found in rough grassland, grassy banks, road verges, beside railways, by hedgerows and hedge banks, on pathways, and on waste ground and disturbed ground, often on heavy soil, especially those rich with lime.

=== Current range ===
The species is found mainly within Southern and Western Europe near the Mediterranean Sea, preferring a temperate climate. On Continental Europe Stone parsley is present in Albania, Bulgaria, Romania, Greece and other countries of the Balkans, and is also found in France, Italy, Spain, Switzerland, and a very small presence in Belgium, and Germany. The plant also appears around the coast of the Black Sea, in Crimea, the Caucasus region, and both European and Asian parts of Turkey, as well as Algeria in North Africa. Sison Amomum also grows on the island of Great Britain, and the Mediterranean islands of Sicily, Corsica, Sardinia, and the Balearic Islands. In Britain it appears mostly in South East England, and in slightly lesser numbers in South West England, the Midlands and South Wales. In North Wales, West Wales, Northern England and the Scottish Borders the plant is also present but is rarer The species has not been reported in northern Scotland and is not present at all on the island of Ireland. Stone parsley is also an introduced species in New Zealand, being more concentrated on the North Island, and has also been introduced on a small part of the coast in Norway.

=== Historic range and spread ===
In the early seventeenth century stone parsley was only recorded in a region of Southern France near the Mediterranean Sea and the Spanish border, by the early eighteenth century it was recorded around the area of Paris, then by the late eighteenth century, it appeared in mid and southern France, in Wales and Northern England. By the mid nineteenth century the plant was detected in greater numbers across much of France and Britain, including Cornwall, and had also had a small presence in Spain, Belgium and Corsica. by the beginning of the twentieth century it had a substantial presence in Italy and a small foothold in Germany, Romania and Sardinia, then by 1950 a small population appeared in Sicily, and the species was also recorded on the other side of the globe on the North Island of New Zealand. By the early twenty-first century the species was recorded as being much more widespread across Britain, France, and New Zealand, increased numbers in Spain Italy, and Sardinia, and had spread to Switzerland, New Zealand's South Island, the Caucasus region near the Black Sea and small numbers in Norway.

== Parasites ==
The larva of some insects are parasites to the stone parsley. Moths which feed on Sison amomum whilst in the larval stage include, Depressaria daucella, Cnephasia incertana, and Epermenia chaerophyllella, the larva of the fly Phytomyza chaerophylli are also parasites of the plant. These insect species are all leaf miner parasites to stone parsley except the Cnephasia incertana moth larva which are hidden parasites, and these insect species can all feed on a range of plants, not just the stone parsley alone.

== External links and further reading ==
- Sison amomum at Open Tree of Life
- Sison amomum at Plants of the World Online
- Sison amomum British distribution map at Botanical Society of Britain and Ireland
- Sison amomum L. at tropicos.org
- Sison amomum L. at Global Biodiversity Information Facility
- Sison amomum(SSOAM) at European and Mediterranean Plant Protection Organization
- Sison amomum L. at Encyclopedia of Life
- Stone parsley at www.naturespot.org.uk
- Stone parsley at www.seasonalwildflowers.com
- Stone parsley at wildflowerfinder.org.uk
- Sison amomum at www.uksouthwest.net
- Sison amomum L. at www.worldfloraonline.org/
- Sison amomum L. at africanplantdatabase.ch/en
- Sison amomum L. at New Zealand Organisms Register
- Sison amomum, stone parsley at Plant Parasites of Europe
- Sison amomum at bibdigital.rjb.csic.es (French)
