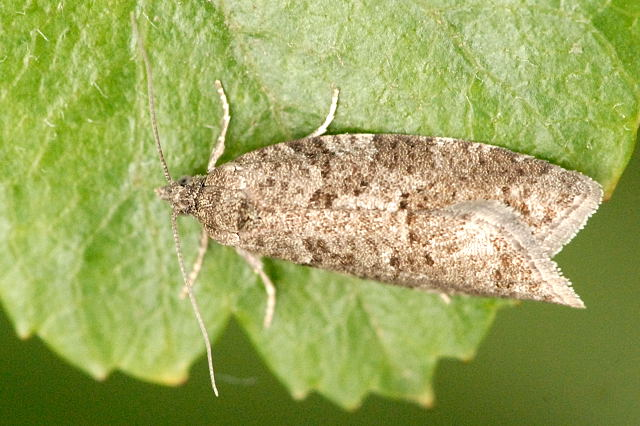

Scientific classification
- Domain: Eukaryota
- Kingdom: Animalia
- Phylum: Arthropoda
- Class: Insecta
- Order: Lepidoptera
- Family: Tortricidae
- Genus: Cnephasia
- Species: C. incertana

Binomial name
- Cnephasia incertana (Treitschke, 1835)

Synonyms
- Sciaphila incertana Treitschke, 1835; Cnephasia incertana f. atticana Razowski, 1958; Tortrix barbarana Walsingham, 1900; Cnephasia incertana f. berguniana Razowski, 1958; Cnephasia kurdistana Amsel, 1955; Cnephasia pascuana ab. leucotaeniana Schawerda, 1914; minorana Herrich-Schaffer, 1847; Tortrix (Sciaphila) minorana Herrich-Schaffer, 1851; minusculana Zeller, 1849; Cnephasia incertana f. proincertana Razowski, 1958; Cnephasia (Cnephasiella) pascuana form ind. pseudocommunana Real, 1953; Sciaphila subjectana Guenee, 1845

= Cnephasia incertana =

Species of moth

Cnephasia incertana, the light grey tortrix, is a moth of the family Tortricidae. It is found all over Europe.

The wingspan is 14–18 mm.

Adults are on wing from June to July.

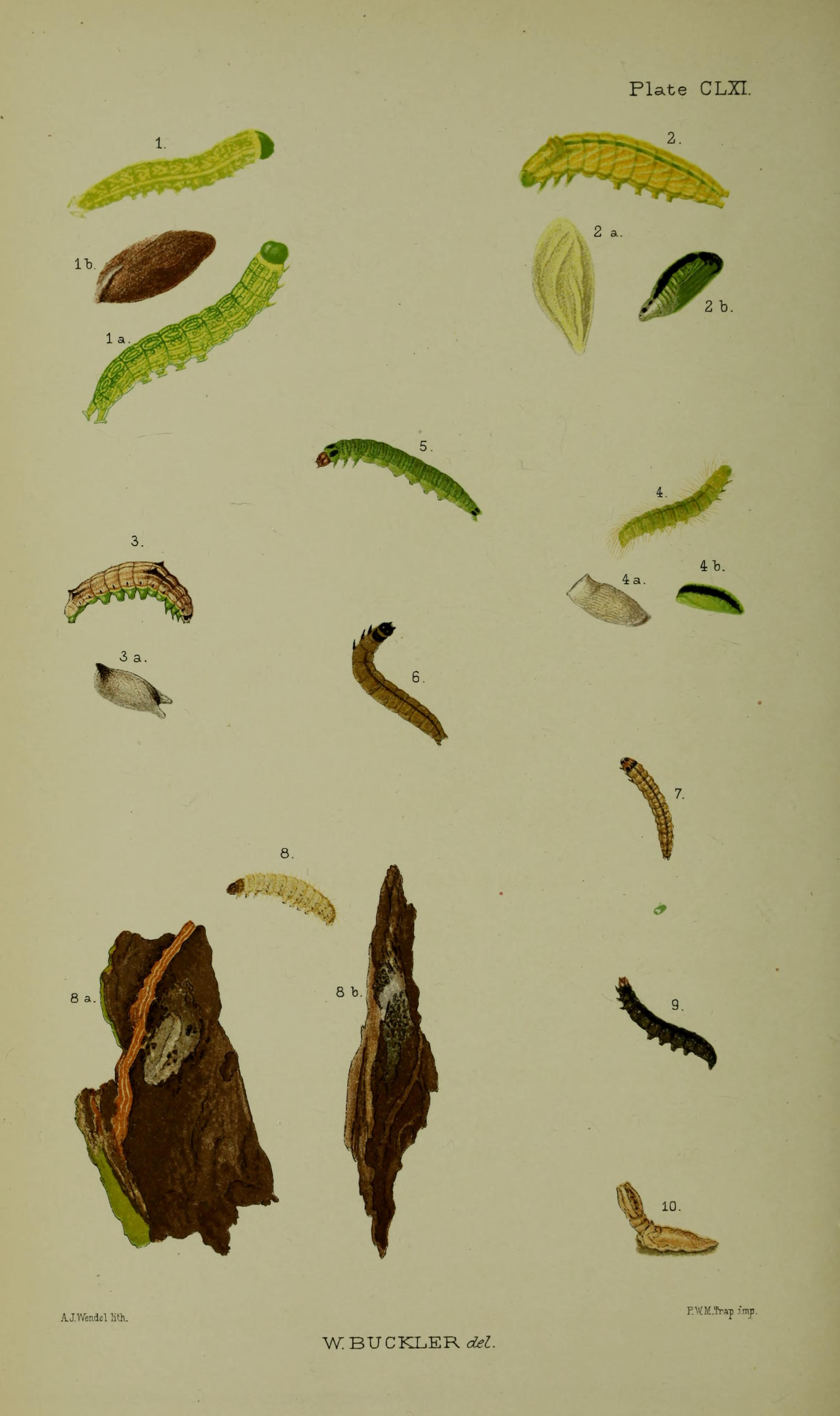
Fig. 9 larva after final moult

The larvae feed on a wide range of herbaceous plants such as Sison amomum, Plantago, and Rumex.
