= Killip =

Killip is a surname of Manx origin. It is a contraction of the Irish and Manx Gaelic surname Mac Fhilib or MacPhilip meaning "son of Philip". Henry Harrison gives an additional proposed origin for the surname as belonging to Killhope, Durham, England. Notable people with the surname include:

- Ben Killip (born 1995), English footballer
- Bert Killip (1879–1941), British socialist activist
- Chris Killip (1946–2020), Manx photographer
- Ellsworth Paine Killip (1890–1968), American botanist
- Rowan Killip, New Zealand-American mathematician
