= Philbin =

McPhilbin or Philbin Irish name: Mac Philbín
- Current region: Connacht, Ireland
- Etymology: patronymic form meaning "Son of little Philip"; McKillop; McPhillips; Phillips; Phillipson; Surnames are of different origin.
- Origin: County Mayo & County Galway
- Members: John MacPhilbín
- Connected families: Burke clan, Bourke, de Burgh, Phillips, McWilliams, Gibbons

Philbin or McPhilbin (Irish name: Mac Philbín) are Irish surnames, which is a patronymic form meaning "Son of Little Philip".

The clan is of Norman origin, and is one of the Hibernicised branches of the Burke clan. Some would have later dropped the prefix. The clan descends from John MacPhilbín, son of Little Philip de Burgh and Grandson of William de Burgh, "of Athanchip". This was the Connacht Burke clan, who from the 14th century were prominent in County Mayo. Historian John O'Donovan, in the Annals of the Four Masters, lists MacPhilbín as one of the chiefs of the district then known as Síol Anmchadha in east Galway. He also claims there are two sects; one in County Mayo and the other in County Galway. The surname is also common in County Sligo.

In Connacht, Phillips is an Anglicisation of McPhilbin. Phillips was used interchangeably with MacPhillips, but later dropped the Mc/Mac prefix.

== Surname ==
- Abie Philbin Bowman, Irish comedian and journalist
- Barry Philbin (born 1950), English rugby league footballer
- Darryl Philbin, fictional character from The Office
- Eugene A. Philbin (1857–1920), American lawyer
- Gerry Philbin (1941–2025), American football player
- J. J. Philbin (born 1974), American screenwriter
- Jim Philbin (born 1950), British fencer
- Joe Philbin (born 1961), American football coach
- Jonathan Philbin Bowman (1969–2000) Irish journalist and broadcaster
- Joy Philbin (born 1941), American television personality
- Maggie Philbin (born 1955), English radio and TV presenter
- Mary Philbin (1903–1993), American silent film actress
- Patrick Philbin (athlete) (1874–1929), British tug of war competitor
- Patrick F. Philbin, American lawyer
- Philip J. Philbin (1898–1972), American Democratic U.S. Congressman
- Regis Philbin (1931–2020), American television personality
- William Philbin (1907–1991), Irish Roman Catholic bishop
