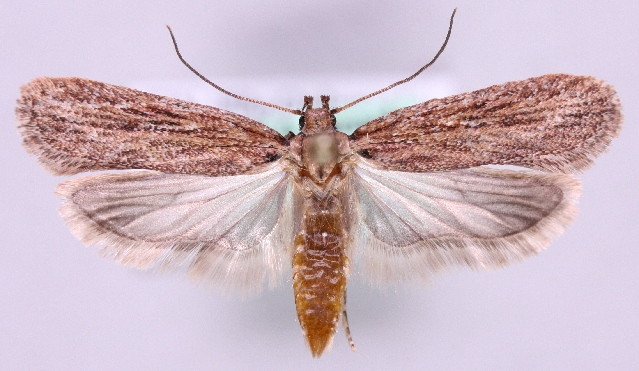

Scientific classification
- Kingdom: Animalia
- Phylum: Arthropoda
- Clade: Pancrustacea
- Class: Insecta
- Order: Lepidoptera
- Family: Depressariidae
- Genus: Depressaria
- Species: D. daucella

Binomial name
- Depressaria daucella (Denis & Schiffermuller, 1775)

Synonyms
- Tinea daucella Denis & Schiffermuller, 1775; Tinea rubricella Denis & Schiffermuller, 1775; Tinea apiella Hubner, 1796; Depressaria nervosa Stephens, 1834

= Depressaria daucella =

Species of moth

Depressaria daucella is a moth of the family Depressariidae. It is found in most of Europe, except for parts of the Balkan Peninsula. It is also found as an introduced species in the west coast of North America.

The wingspan is 21–24 mm. The terminal joint of palpi with two blackish bands. Forewings light brown, somewhat whitish-sprinkled, sometimes slightly reddish-tinged; numerous dark fuscous dashes; two indicating discal stigmata, between which is sometimes a line of pale scales; an obscure pale very acutely angulated fascia at 3/4. Hindwings fuscous-whitish, more fuscous posteriorly; 5 connate with stalk of 3 and 4. The larva is dark bluish -grey; lateral line orange yellow; spots black, white-circled; head black; plate of 2 black, bisected, anterior edge whitish anteriorly.

Adults are on wing from September and after overwintering, again to April.

The larvae are leaf miners and feed on plants including, Sison amomum, Carum verticillatum, Cicuta virosa, Oenanthe aquatica, Oenanthe crocata, Oenanthe fistulosa, and Oenanthe pimpinelloides. Larvae can be found from June to the end of July.

== Gallery ==
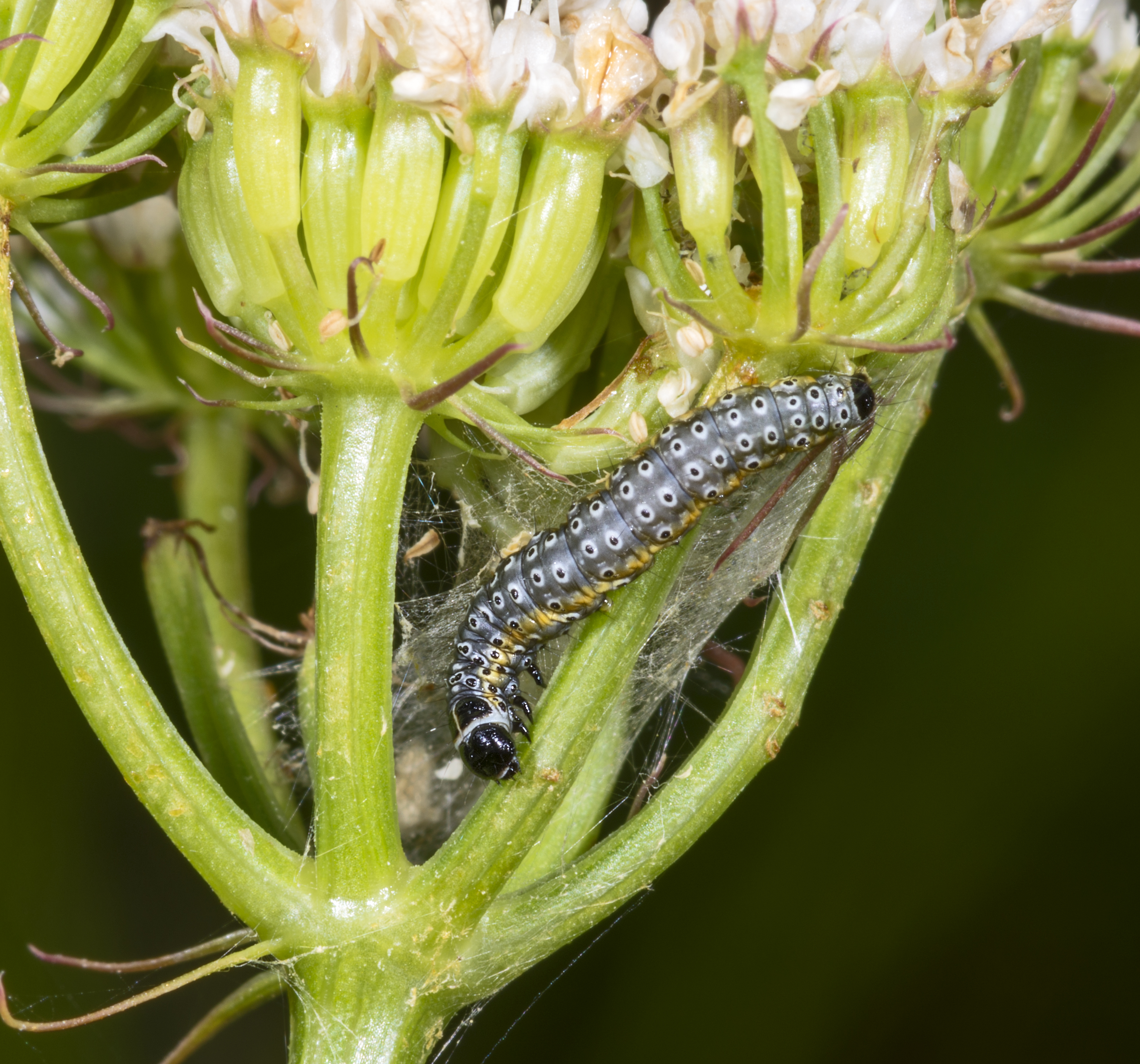
Larva

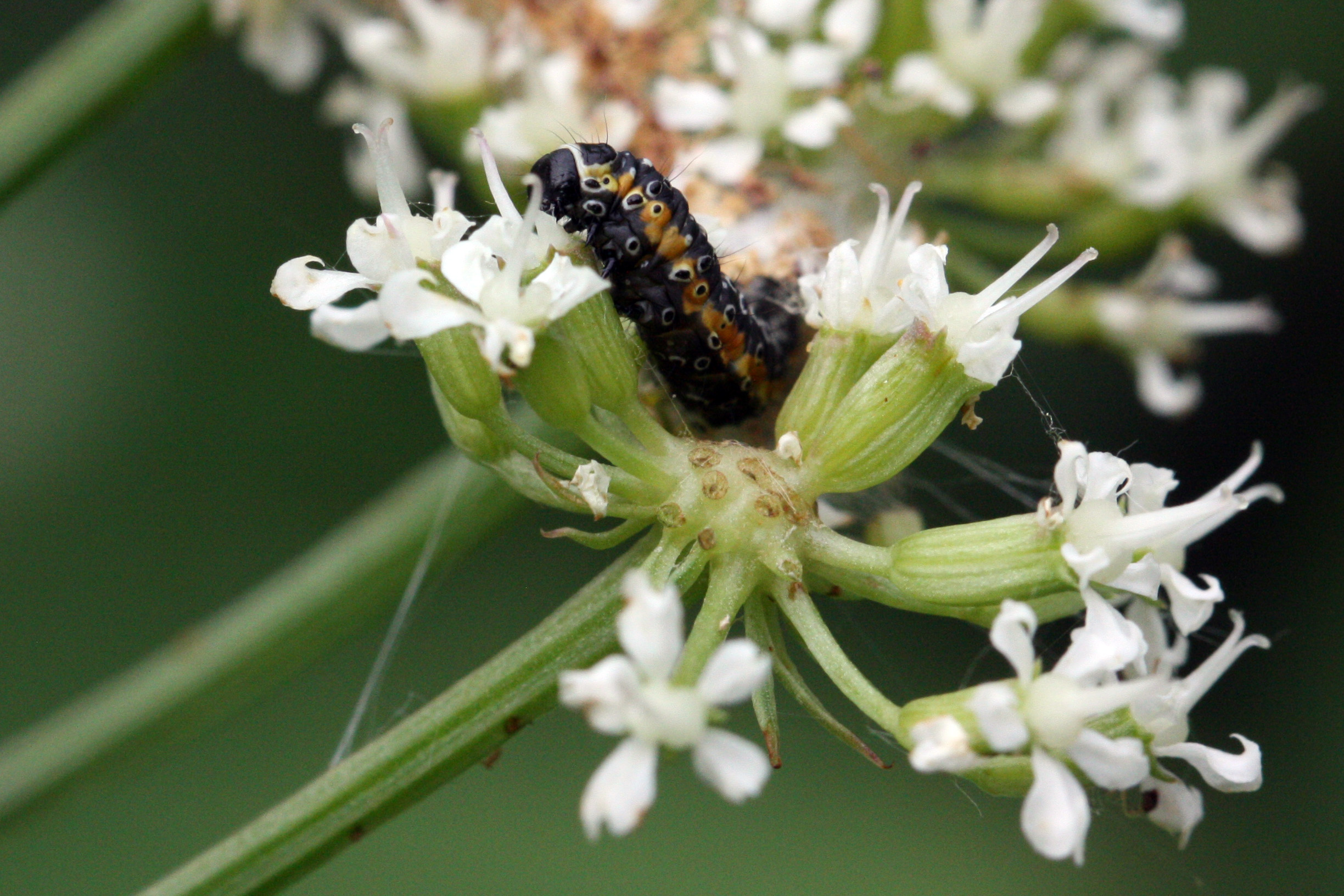
Larva

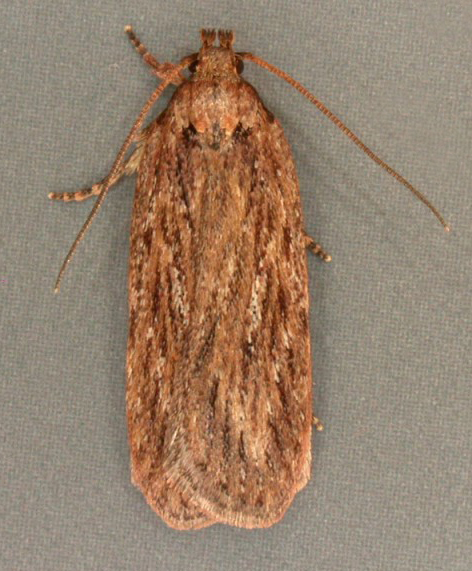
Imago
