= Nicole Roy =

Professor of human nutrition

- Education: Laval University
- Scientific career
- Fields: Nutrition
- Workplaces: AgResearch; University of Auckland; University of Otago
- Theses: Effects of somatostatin immunoneutralization, somatocrinin use and their combination on serum somatotropin concentrations and zootechnical performance of grain-fed calves (1991); Protein Metabolism in Growing Barrows Fed Diets Adequate or Deficient in Lysine (1997)
- Doctoral advisor: Jean Bernier

Nicole Clémence Roy was a Canadian–New Zealand academic, and a full professor at the University of Otago, specialising in nutrition and digestive health, including gastrointestinal physiology and microbiome–host interactions. She was a Fellow of Food Standards Australia New Zealand. Born in Quebec February 2 1965, she died in Palmerston North New Zealand on Saturday May 24 2025.

== Academic career ==
Roy completed a Bachelor of Science, a Master of Science and a PhD, all at Laval University. Her doctoral thesis was titled Protein Metabolism in Growing Barrows Fed Diets Adequate or Deficient in Lysine and was supervised by Jean F. Bernier. Roy did her postdoctoral research at the Rowett Institute in Scotland. Roy worked at AgResearch from 1998, and was appointed principal scientist in 2011. Roy was a professor in the Liggins Institute at the University of Auckland, and since 2016 is an adjunct professor in the Riddet Institute Centre of Research Excellence at Massey University. Roy joined the faculty of the Department of Nutrition at the University of Otago in 2020, and was appointed head of department in 2024.

Roy's research focuses on nutrition and gut health. She was a founding member of the High Value Nutrition National Science Challenge, based at the University of Auckland, and leads the Digestive Health research programme. Through this she is part of a team studying the effect of resistant starch additives to baby food on infant microbiomes, sleep and immune health. Roy has received funding from MBIE and Marsden grants, and in 2023 Roy received a grant from the Health Research Council to investigate associations between gut health, gut microbiomes and the Aotearoa New Zealand diet.

As a Fellow of Food Standards Australia New Zealand, Roy is one of 24 experts providing advice to the government agency.

== Selected works (most recent) ==
- Ng, Hwei Min, Jasjot Maggo, Catherine L. Wall, Simone B. Bayer, Jane A. Mullaney, Diana Cabrera, Karl Fraser et al. "Effects of defatted rice bran-fortified bread on gut microbiome, cardiovascular risk, gut discomfort, wellbeing and gut physiology in healthy adults with low dietary fibre intake." Clinical nutrition ESPEN 67 (2025): 362-376.
- da Silva, Vitor Geniselli, Jane Adair Mullaney, Nicole Clémence Roy, Nick William Smith, Clare Wall, Callum James Tatton, and Warren Charles McNabb. "Complementary foods in infants: an in vitro study of the faecal microbial composition and organic acid production." Food & function 16, no. 9 (2025): 3465-3481.
- Montoya, Carlos A., Dulantha Ulluwishewa, Natalie G. Ahlborn, Nicole C. Roy, and Warren C. McNabb. "Heat treatment of bovine milk influences gastric emptying of lactose but not its apparent small intestinal disappearance in the growing pig as a model for the adult human." The Journal of nutrition 155, no. 2 (2025): 533-539.
- Fraser, Karl, Shanalee C. James, Wayne Young, Richard B. Gearry, Phoebe E. Heenan, Jacqueline I. Keenan, Nicholas J. Talley, Warren C. McNabb, and Nicole C. Roy. "Characterisation of the Plasma and Faecal Metabolomes in Participants with Functional Gastrointestinal Disorders." International journal of molecular sciences 25, no. 24 (2024): 13465.
- Ong, Shien Ping, Jody C. Miller, Warren C. McNabb, Richard B. Gearry, Lara M. Ware, Jane A. Mullaney, Karl Fraser et al. "Study Protocol for a Randomized Controlled Trial Investigating the Effects of the Daily Consumption of Ruminant Milk on Digestive Comfort and Nutrition in Older Women: The YUMMI Study." Nutrients 16, no. 23 (2024): 4215.
- Dowrick, Jarrah M., Nicole C. Roy, Simone Bayer, Chris MA Frampton, Nicholas J. Talley, Richard B. Gearry, and Timothy R. Angeli‐Gordon. "Unsupervised machine learning highlights the challenges of subtyping disorders of gut‐brain interaction." Neurogastroenterology & Motility 36, no. 12 (2024): e14898.
- Silk, Ella T., Simone B. Bayer, Meika Foster, Nicole C. Roy, Michael W. Taylor, Tommi Vatanen, and Richard B. Gearry. "Advancing microbiome research in Māori populations: insights from recent literature exploring the gut microbiomes of underrepresented and Indigenous peoples." MSystems 9, no. 11 (2024): e00909-24.
- Giezenaar, Caroline, Carlos A. Montoya, Kevin Kreutz, Suzanne Hodgkinson, Nicole C. Roy, Louise J. Mace, Karl Fraser, John D. Fernstrom, Warren C. McNabb, and Paul J. Moughan. "Effects of different protein sources on amino acid absorption and plasma appearance of tryptophan, large neutral amino acids, and tryptophan metabolites in pigs." The Journal of nutrition 154, no. 10 (2024): 2948-2962.
- da Silva, Vitor G., Nick W. Smith, Jane A. Mullaney, Clare Wall, Nicole C. Roy, and Warren C. McNabb. "Food-breastmilk combinations alter the colonic microbiome of weaning infants: an in silico study." MSystems 9, no. 9 (2024): e00577-24.
- Cabrera, Diana, Karl Fraser, and Nicole C. Roy. "A metabolomics analysis of interspecies and seasonal trends in ruminant milk: The molecular difference between bovine, caprine, and ovine milk." Journal of dairy science 107, no. 9 (2024): 6511-6527.
- Gillies, Nicola A., Brooke C. Wilson, Jessica R. Miller, Nicole C. Roy, Andrew Scholey, and Andrea J. Braakhuis. "Effects of a flavonoid-rich blackcurrant beverage on markers of the gut-brain axis in healthy females: secondary findings from a 4-week randomized crossover control trial." Current developments in nutrition 8, no. 5 (2024): 102158.
