= Sten Philipson =

Swedish ethicist

Sten Philipson is a Swedish ethicist and Professor of Ethics and Value Research at Strömstad Academy. Born 1946. Cand. theol. 1969, Uppsala University. Master's degree from Harvard University 1981. Doctorate from Uppsala University 1982. His thesis contained among other topics an analysis of the philosophy of Alfred North Whitehead and its application to science. In 1983 Sten was appointed assistant professor of faith and ideology at Uppsala University. Sten Philipson has written thirteen books on various subjects and published a number of articles relating to ethics and value research, particular concerning issues within healthcare. His book Kan en värdegrund ge framgång? was published in December 2011.

From 1986 to 1994 Sten Philipson was a member of a committee for Long term Motivated Research (SALFO) within The Swedish Council for Planning and Coordination of Research. There he was primarily responsible for issues relating to ethics. During 1997-2009 he was also a member of the Council for Ethics within The Swedish National Board of Health and Welfare. 1986-2009 he served as executive member on The Foundation for Work Ethics in Sweden. As an ethicist Sten Philipson was for many years a member of the board of The Swedish Organization for Sexual Education (RFSU) and head of its federation committee. Currently he is teaching and doing research work at Karolinska Institutet in Stockholm. He is also the chairperson of the board of R-företagen, an organization promoting ethics in work life and society.
