= Gustav Hegi =

Swiss botanist

Gustav Hegi (13 November 1876 in Rickenbach, Canton of Zürich - 23 April 1932 in Goldbach, Canton of Zürich) was a Swiss botanist. His name is particularly associated with editing the multi-volume work Illustrierte Flora von Mittel-Europa (Illustrated Flora of Central Europe), which is one of the most comprehensive floras in the World. It contains extensive morphological, ecological and phytogeographical of all plant species occurring in Central Europe.

== Life and career ==
Hegi took his MSc degree at the University of Zürich in 1900. He went on to obtain a PhD degree from the Ludwig-Maximilians-Universität München (LMU) in 1905 under the supervision of Karl von Goebel. He was at the same time (1902–1908) curator at the Botanic Garden of Munich and from 1910 to 1926 extraordinary professor of botany at the Ludwig-Maximilians-Universität München.

Between 1908 and 1931, Hegi wrote - roughly one third - and edited the monumental Illustrierte Flora von Mittel-Europa. The work comprised more than 7,800 pages in 13 volumes. After his death, successive authors and groups of authors have continued the work and two revised editions have appeared, the latest so far in 22 volumes.

- Illustrierte Flora von Mittel-Europa. Mit besonderer Berücksichtigung von Deutschland, Oesterreich und der Schweiz. 1908–1931, 13 volumes; J. F. Lehmanns Verlag, München (Digital edition by the University and State Library Düsseldorf). New edition from 1935, published by Hanser Verlag, München and later Verlag Paul Parey, Berlin. ISBN 3-489-72021-0

The work was preceded by his attempt to describe Alpine flora, regarded as the first comprehensive account of the plant community in the Alpine tundra.

- Alpenflora. Die verbreitetsten Alpenpflanzen von Bayern, Österreich und der Schweiz. 1905, J. F. Lehmanns Verlag, Munich; New edition published by Parey Verlag, 1977. Authorized English translation published by Blackie and Son in 1930, translated by Winifred Margaret Deans.
