= McPhillips =

Surname from Ireland and Scotland

The McPhillips surname may be of Scottish or Irish origin, the surname is found predominantly in Ireland, in Cavan, Fermanagh and Monaghan counties. It is usually derived from the common surname Phillips.

== Etymology and early Irish origins ==
The Christian name Philip was brought to Britain and Ireland by the Normans in the 12th century and was soon gaelicised to Pilib. The surname is of patronymic form and derives from the Gaelic Mac Pilib / Mac Philib, meaning "son of Philip",

Historian Peadar Livingstone claims it is possible that some Maguire's of Fermanagh may have anglicised to McPhillips, but generally the surname owes its origins to Pilib mac Séamus Mac Mathghamhna (Philip MacJames MacMahon).

The McPhillips surname was found to be the 31st most numerous in County Monaghan in 1970. It is almost exclusive in Dartry where it is the 7th most common surname. In Connacht, Phillips is an Anglicisation of McPhilbin which is one of the Hibernicised branches of the Burke clan. The surname was used interchangeably with Mac Philib & McPhillips, but most later dropped the Mc/Mac prefix.

=== Early Scottish origins ===
In Scotland, different variations of the surname can be found in Inverness-shire and Argyllshire. The most common version is McKillop, which can be represented in Scottish Gaelic as MacFhilib and MacPhilip. The McPhillips surname is largely found in the Scottish Lowlands around Lanarkshire and West Lothian, where the surname is the 37th most common surname; the 1841 Scotland Census records indicated that most were of Irish origin at that time.

== People named McPhillips ==
Politics

- Albert McPhillips (1904–1971), Canadian politician
- Albert Edward McPhillips (1862–1938), Canadian Politician & Barrister
- Jack McPhillips (1910–2004), Australian communist and trade unionist
- Mary M. McPhillips, US politician
- Richie McPhillips, SDLP politician

Sports

- Bill McPhillips (1910–1992), Newcastle United goalkeeper
- Cian McPhillips, Irish middle-distance runner
- Colin McPhillips, American surfer
- Conor McPhillips, Irish rugby player
- Frank McPhillips, former Dublin Gaelic footballer
- Johnny McPhillips, Irish & Ulster rugby player
- Karl McPhillips, Irish chess player
- Lee-Ann McPhillips, former long-distance runner from New Zealand
- Paul McPhillips, former Scottish snooker player
- Terry McPhillips, former professional footballer

Literature

- Fiona McPhillips, Irish author

Culture

- Joseph A. McPhillips III (1937–2007), American schoolteacher

Film/Television

- Andrew McPhillips, British director; CGI artist
- Hugh McPhillips (1920–1990), American actor, director
- Mary Helen McPhillips (1931–1998), American/Canadian television personality

Music

- Dave McPhillips is lead guitarist of the Irish Indie Rock Band, The Coronas
- John McPhillips, Irish composer

Other

- Julian L. McPhillips (born 1946), US lawyer

== See also ==
- List of Irish clans in Ulster
- List of Irish clans

== Place names ==
- McPhillips Street Station Casino
- McPhillips Street, Winnipeg
