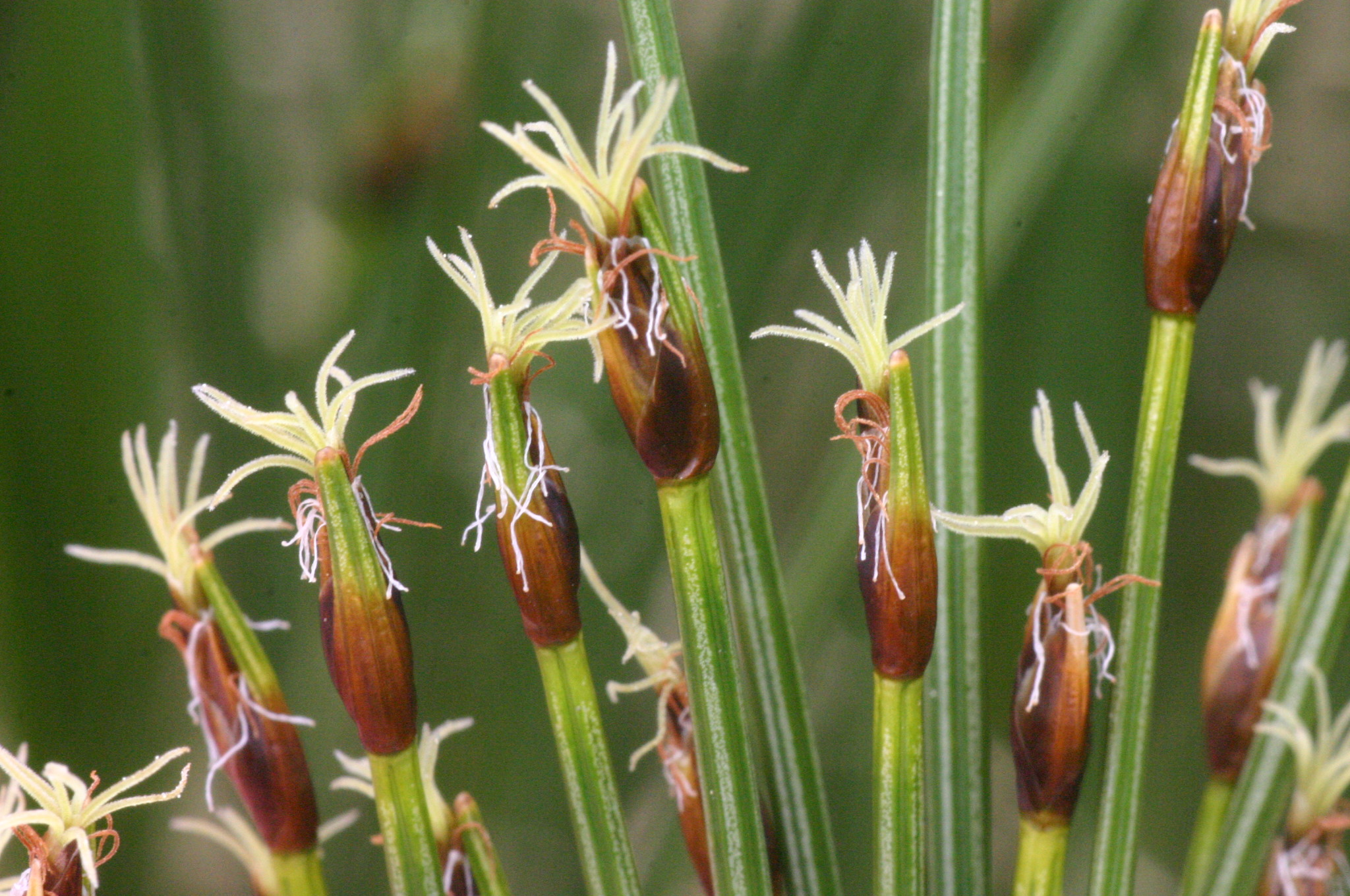
- Trichophorum cespitosum

Scientific classification
- Kingdom: Plantae
- Clade: Embryophytes
- Clade: Tracheophytes
- Clade: Angiosperms
- Clade: Monocots
- Clade: Commelinids
- Order: Poales
- Family: Cyperaceae
- Genus: Trichophorum; Pers.

Type species
- Trichophorum alpinum (L.) Pers.

Synonyms
- Cypringlea M.T.Strong; Eriophorella Holub; Kreczetoviczia Tzvelev; Leucocoma Rydb.; Neoscirpus Y.N.Lee & Y.C.Oh; Oreobolopsis T.Koyama & Guagl.

= Trichophorum =

Genus of flowering plants in the sedge family

Trichophorum is a genus of flowering plants in the sedge family, Cyperaceae. Plants in this genus are known as deergrasses in Britain but are sometimes known as bulrushes in North America.

== Species ==
Species accepted by Plants of the World Online as of February 2024:

- Trichophorum alpinum (L.) Pers.
- Trichophorum analecta (Beetle) Lév.-Bourret & J.R.Starr
- Trichophorum cespitosum (L.) Hartm.
- Trichophorum clementis (M.E.Jones) S.G.Sm.
- Trichophorum clintonii (A.Gray) S.G.Sm.
- Trichophorum coahuilense (Svenson) Lév.-Bourret & J.R.Starr
- Trichophorum dioicum (Y.N.Lee & Y.C.Oh) J.Jung & H.K.Choi
- Trichophorum distigmaticum (Kük.) T.V.Egorova
- Trichophorum dolichocarpum Zakirov
- Trichophorum evadens (C.D.Adams) Lév.-Bourret & J.R.Starr
- Trichophorum filipes (C.B.Clarke) Lév.-Bourret & J.R.Starr
- Trichophorum inversum (Dhooge & Goetgh.) Lév.-Bourret & J.R.Starr
- Trichophorum mattfeldianum (Kük.) S.Yun Liang
- Trichophorum planifolium (Spreng.) Palla
- Trichophorum pumilum (Vahl) Schinz & Thell.
- Trichophorum rigidum (Steud.) Goetgh., Muasya & D.A.Simpson
- Trichophorum scabriculme (Beetle) J.R.Starr, Lév.-Bourret & B.A.Ford
- Trichophorum schansiense Hand.-Mazz.
- Trichophorum subcapitatum (Thwaites) D.A.Simpson
- Trichophorum tepaliferum (T.Koyama & Guagl.) Lév.-Bourret & J.R.Starr
- Trichophorum uniflorum (Trautv.) Karav.
