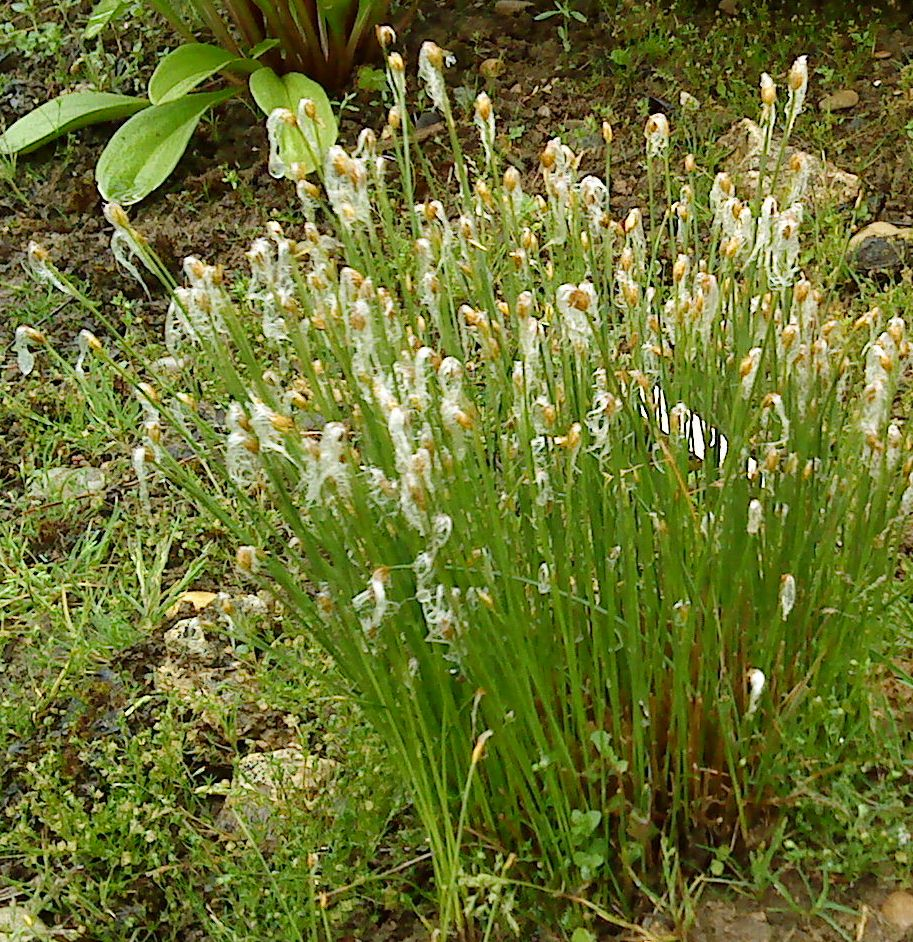

Conservation status
- Secure (NatureServe)

Scientific classification
- Kingdom: Plantae
- Clade: Embryophytes
- Clade: Tracheophytes
- Clade: Angiosperms
- Clade: Monocots
- Clade: Commelinids
- Order: Poales
- Family: Cyperaceae
- Genus: Trichophorum
- Species: T. alpinum

Binomial name
- Trichophorum alpinum (L.) Pers.

Synonyms
- Eriophorum alpinum L.

= Trichophorum alpinum =

Species of flowering plant in the sedge family

Trichophorum alpinum, commonly known as alpine bulrush or cotton deergrass, is a species of flowering plant in the sedge family. It has a circumboreal distribution, occurring throughout the northern latitudes of the Northern Hemisphere. It is present in Europe, Asia, and northern North America.

This sedge produces stems up to 40 centimeters (16 in) tall from a short rhizome. The leaves are no more than a centimeter long. The flowers have cottony white bristles that may extend 2 centimeters (0.79 in) past the spikelet.

This plant grows in bogs and calcareous mountain meadows.
