= Bert Killip =

British socialist activist

Albert Edward Killip (8 July 1879 – 25 March 1941) was a British socialist activist.

Born in Birkenhead, Killip was educated locally, working as a newspaper seller, helping a butcher, and then as a lamplighter. He also joined the Social Democratic Federation (SDF), and was victimised for his socialist activities, losing his job. After spending some time studying at Ruskin College, he was employed by J. W. Gott as a salesman, also acting as an organiser for the British Secular League, which was led by Gott.

In 1907, Killip became the full-time organiser of the SDF in Leeds. There, he decided to raise funds by producing toffees and chocolate under the "Red Flag" brand. Initially an opponent of the Labour Party, he stood against the secretary of Leeds Trades Council in Armley in the 1909 Leeds City Council election. The following year, he argued that Will Thorne should be expelled from the party on the grounds that he was also a Labour Member of Parliament, although this proposal found little support. However, in 1911, the SDF became part of the new British Socialist Party, and when in 1913 this affiliated to Labour, Killip became a vice-president of the Leeds Labour Party, and was the elective auditor of the city from 1913 to 1915.

Killip supported British participation in World War I, and joined the Royal Garrison Artillery in 1915, serving as a sergeant for a year. Along with H. M. Hyndman, he left the SDF, and in 1916 was a founder of the National Socialist Party (NSP). In 1918, he was the Leeds secretary of the National Federation of Discharged and Demobilized Sailors and Soldiers.

Killip later relocated to West Ham, where he served on the town council, and as was an election agent for the Labour Party, working with Tom Kennedy in the 1921 Kirkcaldy Burghs by-election, and later serving the Plaistow and Silvertown constituencies.

He was killed during the Blitz while at Gainsborough Road School in West Ham.
