= Winifred M. Deans =

Translator of German scientific texts

Winifred Margaret Deans (9 October 1901 – 7 June 1990) was a prolific translator of German scientific texts into English, who also taught mathematics and physics to secondary schoolchildren and worked at the Commonwealth Bureau of Animal Nutrition.

== Life and education ==
Deans was one of two siblings, born to Duncan Deans and Mary Ann Sharp, in New Milton, Hampshire, United Kingdom. She graduated with an M.A. with First Class Honours in Mathematics from the University of Aberdeen in 1922. She also obtained a B.Sc. from the same university in 1923. She later studied at Newnham College, Cambridge, obtaining a First Class B.A. after she took Part I of the Mathematical Tripos in 1925. She earned another M.A. from Cambridge in 1929.

Deans won several awards in the course of her education, the University of Aberdeen awarding her the Simpson mathematical prize and the Neil Arnott prize for experimental physics in 1921; she also stood first in the examination for the Greig prize in natural philosophy.

== Work ==
Deans taught mathematics and physics at the Harrow County Secondary School for Girls for two years. She then returned to Aberdeen and received a Diploma in Education in 1927. She joined Blackie and Son, a publishing house in Glasgow as an Assistant Science Editor. She began translating German publications, primarily related to Physics and Mathematics, for them. Important translations included those of texts by Max Born, Léon Brillouin, Louis de Broglie, Peter Debye, Richard Gans, Robert Pohl and Erwin Schrödinger. She also translated Else Wegener and Fritz Loewe's chronicle of Alfred Wegener's fourth expedition to Greenland, undertaken in 1930–31.

Deans joined the Commonwealth Bureau of Animal Nutrition which was part of the Rowett Research Institute, Aberdeen, in 1945. She retired from the bureau in 1966. Her library and personal papers were given to the University of Aberdeen, and can now be found in their Special Collections, Library and Archives.

== Translations ==
- With J F Shearer: Collected Papers on Wave Mechanics, E Schrödinger, translated in 1928
- Selected Papers on Wave Mechanics, L de Broglie and L Brillouin, translated in 1928
- Alpine Flowers: The Most Common Alpine Plants of Switzerland, Austria and Bavaria, G Hegi, translated in 1930
- The Dipole Moment and Chemical Structure, P Debye, translated in 1931
- The Interference of Electrons, P Debye, translated in 1931
- Vector Analysis and Applications to Physics, R Gans, translated in 1932
- Physical Principles of Mechanics and Acoustics, R Pohl, translated in 1932
- The Structure of Molecules, P Debye, translated in 1932
- The Restless Universe, M Born, translated in 1935
- The Cave Children, A T Sonnleitner, translated in 1935
- With J Dougall: The Physics of Solids and Fluids, P P Ewald, T Poschl and L Prandtl, translated in 1936
- Greenland Journey, E Wegener and F Loewe, translated in 1939
- Hinterland Liberia, E Becker-Donner, translated in 1939
