= A. T. Phillipson =

British veterinary surgeon and physiologist

Andrew Tindal Phillipson FRSE (1910–1977) was a 20th-century British veterinary surgeon and physiologist.

== Life ==
He was born in London on 19 August 1910 the second son of John Tindal Phillipson and his wife, Cicely Gough Paterson. He was educated at Christ's College in Finchley in London. He then studied at St Catharine's College, Cambridge, graduating BA in 1931.

In 1947, he became Head of Physiology at the Rowett Research Institute, becoming Deputy Director in 1952.

In 1953, he was elected a Fellow of the Royal Society of Edinburgh. His proposers were David Cuthbertson, Ernest Cruickshank, William Ogilvy Kermack, Vero Wynne-Edwards and Robert Campbell Garry.

In 1963, he became Professor of Veterinary Clinical Studies at Cambridge University.

He died on 10 January 1977.

== Family ==
In 1936, he married Rachel Margaret Young, a sister of John Zachary Young. They had three sons.

== Publications ==
- Physiology of Digestion and Metabolism in the Ruminant (1970)
- Scientific Foundations of Veterinary Medicine (1980)
