= Philipp =

Philipp is both a surname and a given name. Notable people with the name include:

"Philipp" has also been a shortened version of Philippson, a German surname especially prevalent amongst German Jews and Dutch Jews.

Surname

- Adolf Philipp (1864–1936), German/American actor, composer and playwright
- David Philipp (biologist), biologist
- David Philipp (footballer) (born 2000), German footballer
- Karen Philipp (Born 1945), American singer and actress
- Elke Philipp (born 1964), German Paralympic equestrian
- Elliot Philipp (1915–2010), British gynaecologist and obstetrician
- Franz Philipp (1890–1972), German church musician and composer
- Gustav Adolf Eduard Philipp (1841-1897), German politician and businessman
- Hans Philipp (1917–1943), German fighter ace during WW II
- Julius Philipp (1878–1944), German metal trader
- Lutz Philipp (1940–2012), German long-distance runner
- Maximilian Philipp (born 1994), German footballer
- Oscar Philipp (1882–1965), German and British metal trader
- Paul Philipp (born 1950), Luxembourgian football player and manager
- Peter Philipp (1971–2014), German writer and comedian
- Robert Philipp (1895–1981), American Impressionist painter

Given name

- Philipp Bargfrede (born 1989), German footballer
- Philipp Birkenmaier (born 1975), German politician
- Philipp Bönig (born 1980), German footballer
- Philipp Bruck (born 1989), German politician
- Philipp von Cobenzl, Austrian diplomat
- Philipp Dehne (born 1984), German politician
- Philip James Devereaux, Canadian clinical epidemiologist
- Philipp Depiereux (born 1977) is a German author and entrepreneur
- Philipp Grubauer, German professional ice hockey goaltender
- Philipp Hainhofer, inventor of the cuckoo clock
- Philipp Heerwagen (born 1983), German footballer
- Philipp Heißner (born 1988), German politician
- Philipp Herkenhoff (born 1999), German basketball player
- Philipp Heyden (born 1988), German basketball player
- Philipp Hofmann (born 1993), German footballer
- Philipp Karner (born 1979), American actor
- Philipp Kirkorov (born 1967) Russian pop singer
- Philipp Kohlschreiber, German tennis player
- Philipp Kurashev (born 1999), Swiss ice hockey player
- Philipp Lahm (born 1983), German footballer
- Philipp Langen (born 1986), German footballer
- Philipp Lienhart (born 1996), Austrian footballer
- Philipp Meyer (born 1974) American writer
- Philipp Muntwiler (born 1987), Swiss footballer
- Philipp Netzer (born 1985), Austrian footballer
- Philipp Öttl (born 1996), German motorcycle racer
- Philipp Pentke (born 1985), German footballer
- Philipp Raulfs (born 1991), German politician
- Philipp Schmitt (1902–1950), German SS commandant of Nazi prison camp executed for war crimes
- Philipp Steiner (born 1986), Austrian footballer
- Philipp Tanzer (born 1977), German men's rights activist

== See also ==
- Philippe (disambiguation)
- Phillip (disambiguation)
- Philippin
