= Depiereux =

Depiereux is a German surname. Notable people with the surname include:

- Philipp Depiereux (born 1977) is a German author and entrepreneur
- Philip James Devereaux (fl. 2011), Canadian clinical epidemiologist
