= WMTS =

WMTS may refer to:

- WMTS-FM, a radio station (88.3 FM) licensed to Murfreesboro, Tennessee, United States
- Wireless Medical Telemetry Service, certain frequencies set aside by the FCC for wireless medical telemetry
- Web Map Tile Service, an Open Geospatial Consortium (OGC) standard for providing map tiles (small images that are part of a map) via the internet
