= Brothel Scene =

Painting by Frans van Mieris the Elder

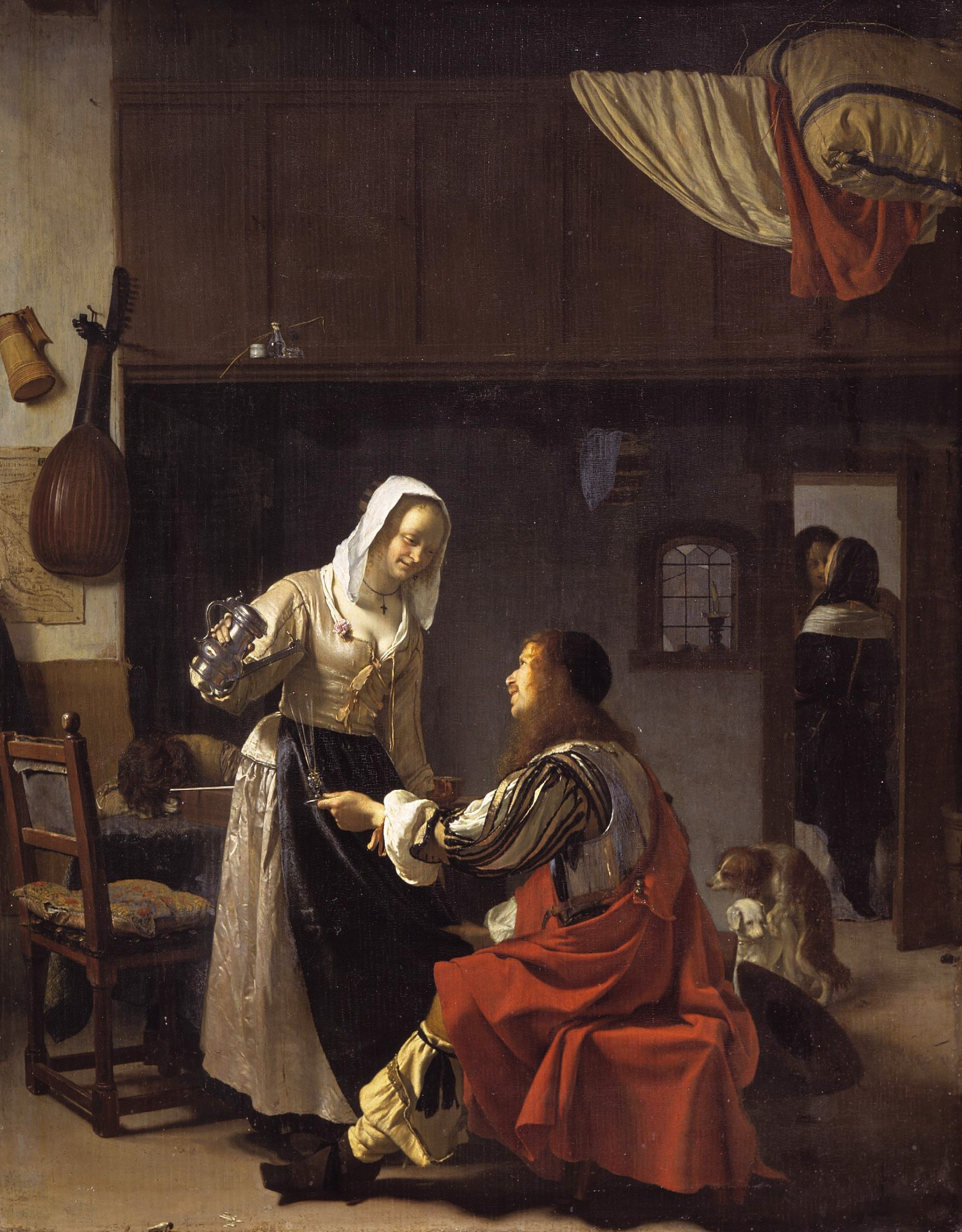
- Artist: Frans van Mieris the Elder
- Year: c. 1658–1659
- Type: oil on panel
- Dimensions: 42.5 cm × 33.3 cm (16.7 in × 13.1 in)
- Location: Mauritshaus, The Hague

Brothel Scene or Scene in an Inn is an oil on panel painting by the Dutch Golden Age painter Frans van Mieris, executed c. 1658–1659. Since 29 January 1960 it has been in the collection of the Mauritshuis, in The Hague.

It was first recorded in the collection of one Lady Seaforth. It was then owned by Ch. Bredel until 1 May 1875 and then by A. Devy of London until 16 June 1876. Its next owner was the Earl of Dudley, who sold it to E. Steinkopf of London on 25 June 1892. It next appears in the written record in 1935, when it was owned by the art dealer Duits and Company. Five years later it was owned by Fritz Mannheimer of Amsterdam.

In 1941 it was bought by Dienststelle Mühlmann of The Hague for Adolf Hitler, who placed it in the Führermuseum in Linz near his birthplace Braunau. It was later transferred to the Stichting Nederlands Kunstbezit and then to the Dienst voor's Rijks Verspreide Kunstvoorwerpen, both in The Hague.
