= Annette de la Renta =

French-American philanthropist

- Born: Anne France Mannheimer; 24 December 1939 (age 86); Nice, France
- Other name: Anne France Engelhard
- Occupations: Philanthropist, socialite
- Spouses: Samuel Pryor Reed (m. 1960; div. 1986) Oscar de la Renta (m. 1989; died 2014)
- Children: 4
- Parent(s): Fritz Mannheimer; Jane Engelhard
- Relatives: Charles W. Engelhard Jr. (step-father)

Annette de la Renta (born 24 December 1939) is an American philanthropist and socialite, the widow of the Dominican fashion designer Oscar de la Renta. She was named to the International Best Dressed List Hall of Fame in 1973.

== Birth and childhood ==
Born in Nice, France, as Anne France Mannheimer and nicknamed Annette, she is the only child of a German Jewish banker, Fritz Mannheimer (1890–1939), who died before her birth, and his Roman Catholic wife, Mary Jane Reiss (1917-2004, aka Marie Annette Jane Reiss, aka Jane Engelhard). Her German-born maternal grandfather, Hugo Reiss, was a German Jewish businessman in Shanghai, China, where he served as the Brazilian consul; and her maternal grandmother, Mary Ignatius Murphy, was a Roman Catholic of Irish descent from San Francisco.

De la Renta attended the Foxcroft School in Middleburg, Virginia.

In 1947, after her mother moved to the United States and remarried, Annette Mannheimer was adopted by her stepfather, Charles W. Engelhard Jr., an industrial magnate, and became Annette Engelhard; she became an American citizen in 1966. She was raised in the Roman Catholic faith of her mother.

== Marriages and family life ==
In 1960, she married private investor Samuel Pryor Reed (1934 - 2005) in a Roman Catholic ceremony in Bernardsville, New Jersey. He was a vice president of Engelhard Industries, the minerals conglomerate; who later owned American Heritage magazine. Reed and Annette eventually divorced. The couple had three children, two daughters, Eliza Reed and Beatrice Morrison, and a son, Charles Reed.

In 1989, she married fashion designer Oscar de la Renta in La Romana, Dominican Republic, becoming step-mother of his adopted son, Moises de la Renta.

In July 2006, Annette de la Renta and JPMorgan Chase were appointed temporary guardians of the 104-year-old Brooke Astor, a long-time friend, in the wake of elder abuse allegations being made against Astor's son, Anthony Dryden Marshall. In October 2006, de la Renta and JPMorgan Chase became permanent guardians. On 20 October 2014, her husband, Oscar de la Renta, died of cancer, at age 82.

== Philanthropy ==
De la Renta serves on the boards of the Metropolitan Museum, the New York Public Library, the Morgan Library, the Animal Medical Center, and the Engelhard Foundation. She also served on the board of directors of Rockefeller University for 25 years, and now serves as a trustee emeritus.
