= Remote patient monitoring =

Technology to monitor patients outside of conventional clinical settings

Remote patient monitoring (RPM) is medical monitoring of a patient by a doctor from a remote location (meaning across a large distance). A patient can stay at home or somewhere else other than a hospital while getting some health care. RPM can increase the percent of people who have access to health care, decrease the cost of health care for a person, or both. It is one kind of telehealth. RPM is not a doctor's visit; it includes constant monitoring of physical signs and symptoms. It is also used very often in medical studies. Patient Reported Outcomes (PROs) for clinical trials are captured remotely via a tablet. People are trying to make communication methods only for patients and doctors, but methods for the general public can be used for health care. For example Zoom, Snapchat, or even landline phones.

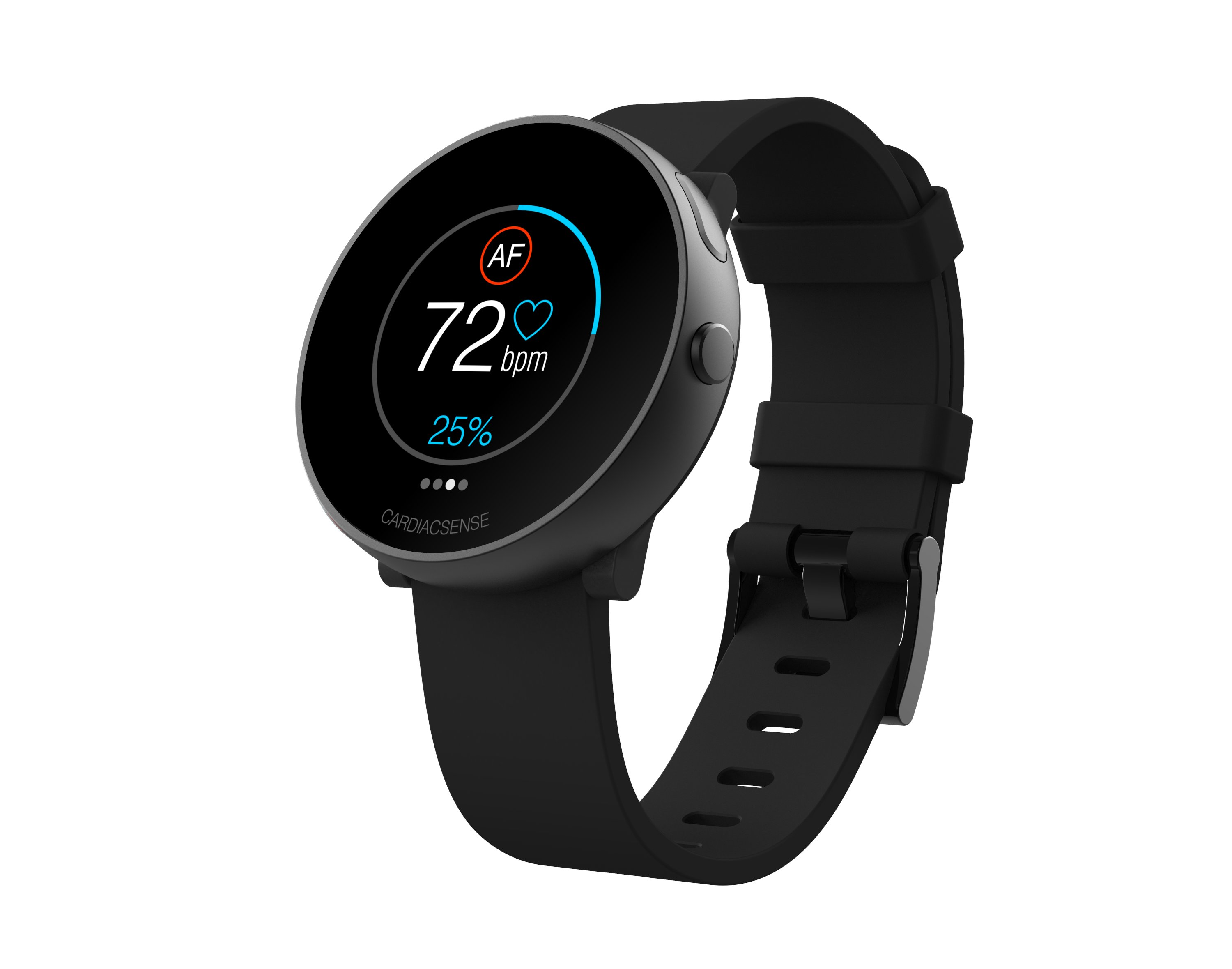
Devices like smartwatches frequently get new tools for RPM, such as heart rate monitors.

Research shows that RPM lowers the need for emergency department visits and overnight hospitalization. Among people who still need to spend nights inpatient, the technology lowers the number of nights and the chance of readmission. A small survey of patients with multiple chronic diseases (long term, sometimes permanent health problems) found most participants self reported at least one barrier to health care that might be helped with RPM. A very small study showed that patients who are at home and giving themselves complicated medical procedures (specifically hemodialysis for kidney failure) might benefit from the technology. A meta-analysis showed that RPM interventions based on health behavior models and personal coaching are better than other RPM interventions, but the RPM itself may or may not be better than in person care. One study found the technology can lead to better patient outcomes and higher patient satisfaction. A randomized controlled trial (one of the best ways to study new kinds of health care) concluded that a telehealth ecosystem (where health care providers can not only get information from monitors but also quickly give patients advice based on the information) improved patients' quality of life, but it did not lower the chance of repeat hospitalization or death.

Pilot programs for RPM began during the 1970s in the United States. The health care group Kaiser Permanente created monitoring systems for people in rural and isolated areas.

During the COVID-19 pandemic, RPM was used much more than before It was also allowed in more types of health care, such as psychology and cardiology. In 2020 it was predicted that by '25 the industry would double. Factors include the pandemic and increased at-home care. Using RPM improves patient compliance, improves physician management, and lowers costs of care. The technology is predicted to become more important as healthcare changes from a volume focus to a value focus.

== Key features of RPM ==
=== Accessibility ===
Both patients and care providers can access the RPM record anytime from anywhere. Instantaneous access is helpful in making accurate health decisions and improves clinical operations.

=== Cost effectiveness ===
Not much evidence has been able to support whether or not telehealth is more cost effective or not. There is some research showing that it can be a less expensive way for doctors to provide care because they aren't using any of their physical resources on the patient. Sage journals published a case study researching if telehealth is cost effective for the patient in the comfort of their home. Langabeer et al. (2017), stated that this study's method was to utilize telehealth resources when people called 911 and EMS responded. Once EMS was on scene, they would pull up a virtual system putting them in direct contact with an emergency department provider at the hospital. The provider was then able to triage the patient at the scene of the call and determine the best course of treatment potentially being no transport to the hospital. This in turn is more cost efficient for the patients and the medical providers both. This showed to be helpful in-patient outcomes because the provider was able to determine the critical level of the patient therefore allowing them to determine the best course of action at an earlier time.

=== Promptness ===
RPM helps in faster decision-making. RPM collects, improves, and analyzes data promptly, which is time-saving. Report-making has become easy through RPM.

== Technological components ==
The diverse applications of RPM lead to numerous variations of RPM technology architecture. However, most RPM technologies follow a general architecture that consists of four components.:

- Sensors on a device that is enabled by wireless communications to measure physiological parameters.
- Sensors can connect back to a central database by WiFi or cellular communication protocols depending on the manufacturer.
- Local data storage at patients' site that interfaces between sensors and other centralized data repository and/or healthcare providers.
- Centralized repository to store data sent from sensors, local data storage, diagnostic applications, and/or healthcare providers.
- Diagnostic application software that develops treatment recommendations and intervention alerts based on the analysis of collected data.

Depending on the disease and the parameters that are monitored, different combinations of sensors, storage, and applications may be deployed.

== Applications ==
Physiological data such as blood pressure and subjective patient data are collected by sensors on peripheral devices. Examples of peripheral devices are: blood pressure cuff, pulse oximeter, and glucometer. The data are transmitted to healthcare providers or third parties via wireless telecommunication devices. The data are evaluated for potential problems by a healthcare professional or via a clinical decision support algorithm, and patient, caregivers, and health providers are immediately alerted if a problem is detected. As a result, timely intervention ensures positive patient outcomes. The newer applications also provide education, test and medication reminder alerts, and a means of communication between the patient and the provider. The following section illustrates examples of RPM applications, but RPM is not limited to those disease states

=== Cancer ===
A study with hundreds of people who already had cancer and then got COVID-19 found RPM decreased the chance of hospitalization for COVID. A few studies suggest that among people dealing with cancer treatment side effects, the technology lowers depression, fatigue, and pain. However more study is needed.

=== COVID-19 ===
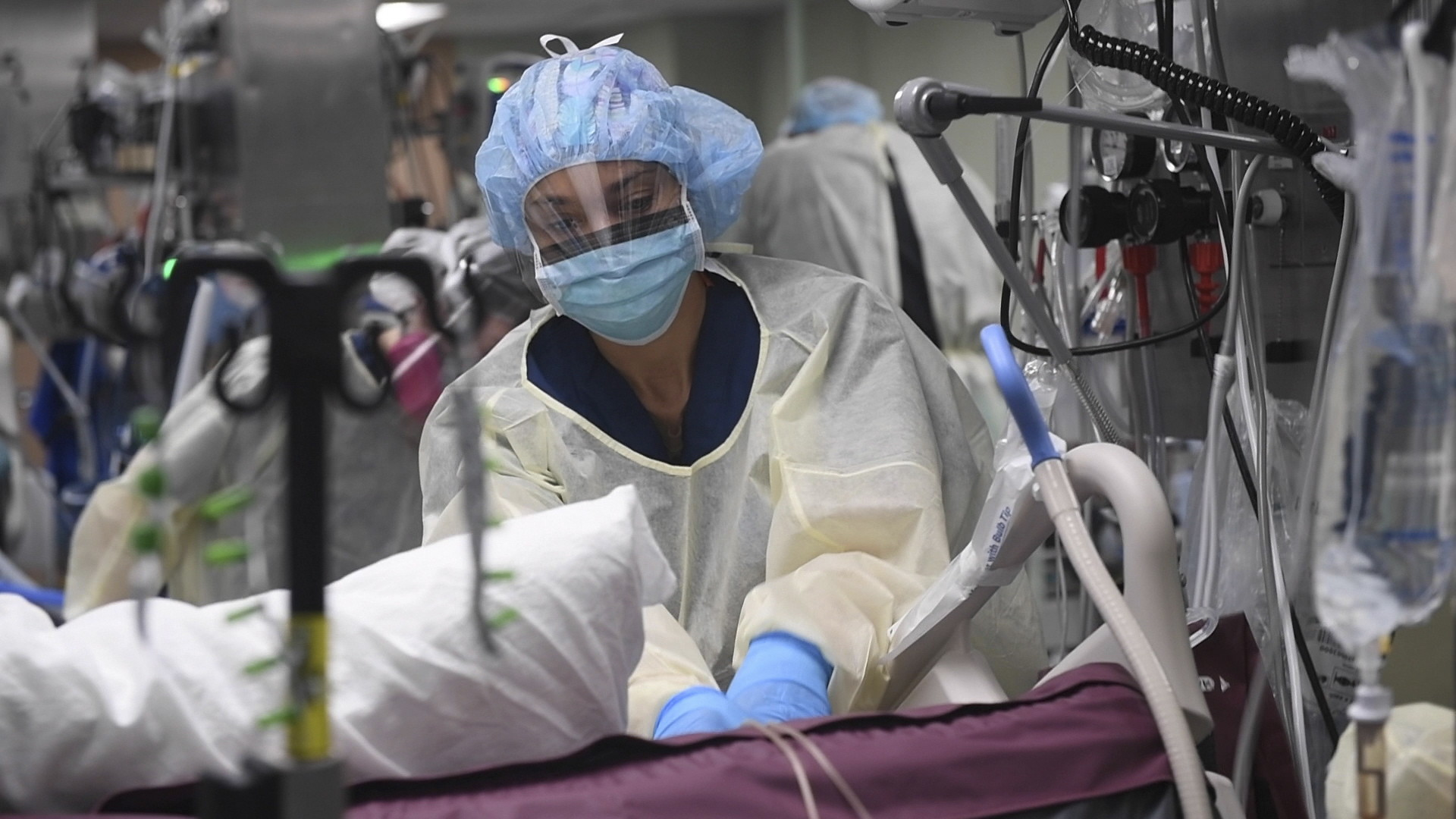
The use of remote patient monitoring reduces face-to-face interactions between physician and patient.

RPM can provide continuity of care for symptomatic COVID-19 patients post-discharge from hospital and those with mild to moderate oxygen desaturation levels that do not require hospitalization, and patients with long-COVID symptoms. Due to the nature of the pandemic, RPM is a necessary means of providing care to at-risk patients such as elderly or immunocompromised people.

Studies show that the use of RPM during the pandemic has helped to reduce hospitalizations and decrease the use of acute care resources.

The FDA has given emergency authorized use of RPM technologies for the purpose of decreasing the spread of COVID-19 and to prevent overload for healthcare resources and personnel.

=== Chronic Obstructive Pulmonary Disease (COPD) ===
For patients with chronic obstructive pulmonary disease, RPM may contribute to increased patient knowledge, earlier interventions, and shared decision making. However, the evidence is varying and issues of cost, and the shift of responsibilities to patients have also been raised.

=== Dementia and falls ===
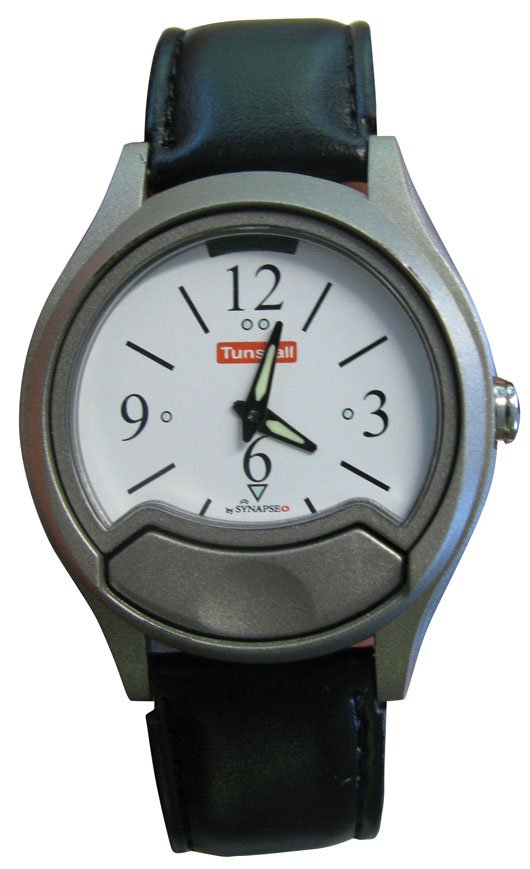
Telehealth response watch

People who are elderly, have dementia, or both have an increased risk of getting serious injuries from falls. RPM can tell somebody when a patient falls, and an attached global positioning system (GPS) can tell where the patient is. Getting help as soon as possible improves recovery. Scientists are trying to make technology that predicts when a patient will fall and thus prevent it from happening.

=== Diabetes ===
Diabetes management requires control of multiple parameters: blood pressure, weight, and blood glucose. The real-time delivery of blood glucose and blood pressure readings enables immediate alerts for patient and healthcare providers to intervene when needed. There is evidence to show that daily diabetes management involving RPM is just as effective as usual clinic visit every 3 months.

=== Congestive heart failure ===
A systematic review of the literature on home monitoring for heart failure patients indicates that RPM improves quality of life, improves patient-provider relationships, shortens duration of stay in hospitals, decreases mortality rate, and reduces costs to the healthcare system.

=== Home hospitalization ===
RPM is a crucial component of hospital-at-home programs, allowing patients to more safely go without 24/7 in-person nursing.

=== Infertility ===
A recent study of a remote patient monitoring solution for infertility demonstrated that for appropriately screened patients who had been seeking In-Vitro Fertilization (IVF) treatment, a six-month remote monitoring program had the same pregnancy rate as a cycle of IVF. The remote patient monitoring product and service used had a cost-per-patient of $800, compared to the average cost of a cycle of IVF of $15,000, suggesting a 95% reduction in the cost of care for the same outcome.

=== Surgery ===
When compared to standard of care with no devices, a 2021 study showed that post-surgical remote patient monitoring detected 30% more medication errors, 10-14% reduction in patient paint, and a 5% reduction in hospital re-admissions. The randomized study, conducted by PJ Devereaux and Micheal McGillion, split 905 patients between a standard of care group and a RPM group, which used at-home clinical grade vital sign devices to transfer their vital signs to a Clinician Portal where they were monitored remotely and could communicate through text, chat, or video calls. The scientists (Devereaux and McGillion) are now conducting two follow-up studies (PVC-RAM 2 and PVC-RAM 3) to investigate secondary findings of PVC RAM1.

=== Telemedicine in prison systems ===
A forerunner to RPM, Florida first experimented with "primitive" telemedicine use in its prisons during the latter 1980s. Working with Doctors Oscar W. Boultinghouse and Michael J. Davis, from the early 1990s to 2007, Glenn G. Hammack led the University of Texas Medical Branch's development of a pioneering telehealth program in Texas state prisons. Many of the studies conducted on telehealth have focused on the effectiveness in rural or remote communities so an article published by plos one looked at a study done focusing on the effectiveness of telehealth in the prison system. This review looked at 29 different studies that all utilized telehealth in the prison slightly different. The parameters and interventions delivered varied causing the outcomes to vary. The overall systemic review provided mixed evidence on the impact and outcomes of telehealth usage in prisons. Considering the fact, the world population is growing this means so is the prison population which also means the spectrum of health issues is also broadening. This being the main reason for these studies to have been conducted. This leads to the conclusion that more testing and studies must be completed too fully determine the effectiveness in patient outcomes. There was definitely evidence in the studies showing a positive effect from telehealth in the prison system and it did in some cases prove to be effective with positive impacts. It also showed in some cases to be just as effective as normal conventional care. The study stated that the idea to consider is what is being treated and what the context of the situation being addressed is. If the situation is critical, then other measures or responses may be necessary.

=== Veterans Health Administration ===
The Veterans Health Administration (VHA), United States' largest integrated healthcare system, is an early adopter which became highly involved in the implementation and evaluation of RPM technologies. It has expanded use of RPM beyond common chronic disease applications, to post-traumatic stress disorder, cancer and palliative care. VHA's findings indicate improvements in a wide range of metrics, including decrease in emergency department visits, hospitalizations, and nursing home admissions. Findings from the VHA Care Coordination/Home Telehealth program show that RPM deployment resulted in significant savings to the organization.

=== Whole System Demonstrator Trial in UK ===
The UK's Department of Health's Whole System Demonstrator (WSD) launched in May 2008. It is the largest randomised control trial of telehealth and telecare in the world, involving 6191 patients and 238 GP practices across three sites, Newham, Kent and Cornwall. The trials were evaluated by: City University London, University of Oxford, University of Manchester, Nuffield Trust, Imperial College London and London School of Economics.

- 45% reduction in mortality rates
- 20% reduction in emergency admissions
- 15% reduction in A&E visits
- 14% reduction in elective admissions
- 14% reduction in bed days
- 8% reduction in tariff costs

In the UK, the Government's Care Services minister, Paul Burstow, has stated that telehealth and telecare would be extended over the next five years (2012–2017) to reach three million people.

== Limitations ==
RPM is highly dependent on the individual's motivation to manage their health. Without the patient's willingness to be an active participant in their care, RPM implementation will likely fail. The shift of accountability associated with RPM brings up liability issues. There are no clear guidelines in respect to whether clinicians have to intervene every time they receive an alert regardless of the urgency. The continuous flow of patient data requires a dedicated team of health care providers to handle the information, which may, in fact, increase the workload. Although technology is introduced with the intent to increase efficiency, it can become a barrier to some healthcare providers that are not technological. There are common obstacles that health informatics technologies encounter that applies to RPM. Depending on the comorbidities monitored, RPM involves a diverse selection of devices in its implementation. Standardization is required for data exchange and interoperability among multiple components. Furthermore, RPM deployment is highly dependent on an extensive wireless telecommunications infrastructure, which may not be available or feasible in rural areas. Since RPM involves transmission of sensitive patient data across telecommunication networks, information security is a concern. Debate surrounds the potential cybersecurity issues of RPM, including the likelihood of hacks which could pull personal medical data. Additionally, most remote monitoring devices are limited to single-user applications, and could be expanded in the future for better inclusion of multi-user technologies.

== Reimbursement ==
=== United States ===
Since 2020, Medicare fully covers doctors and other medical staff receiving payment for RPM patient setup and training. This is then followed by a fixed monthly amount for operating health monitoring devices and logging patient readings. Medicaid also covers these procedures in 34 states.

Cigna, Humana and UnitedHealth Care are among the large private U.S. private health insurance companies that offer members to track certain health data, such as blood pressure, glucose values and other metrics, and send them to their virtual primary care providers who can review the data during patient visits. Some of these plans include coverage of the use of medical devices for remote patient monitoring.

=== Germany ===
Digital health applications (known as DiGA in German: "Digitale Gesundheitsanwendungen") have been eligible for nationwide insurance coverage since the end of 2019 through a fast-track application process. Medical devices that are used for remote patient monitoring through apps, have to be considered Category I (low risk) or IIa (low-medium risk) to be eligible. Telehealth and coaching, even when combined with remote patient monitoring through wearables, is not directly covered by the DiGA directive, but needs to be reimbursed separately under different provisions.

== Controversy ==
Published by the New England Journal of Medicine, a randomized controlled clinical trial involving congestive heart failure patients concluded that the use of telemonitoring failed to provide a benefit over usual care. The telemonitoring patient group was instructed to call a designated number daily, and answer a series of questions about their symptoms using a keypad. Clearly, the process described by Chaudhry et al. (2010) differs from the RPM methodology illustrated in the overview, which involves actual collection and transmission of physiological data through point-of-care devices. With articles from Forbes associating RPM with the negative findings by Chaudhry et al. (2010), it may be difficult to clear the misconception that telemonitoring is synonymous with remote patient monitoring. Researchers at the Semnan University of Medical Science have determined that while Remote Patient Monitoring is a more feasible type of care for elderly people at home, especially during a difficult period like the ongoing COVID-19 pandemic, it is difficult for physicians to maintain control over their care while not under their supervision. The lack of standardization of RPM nomenclature and definition makes it difficult to differentiate between different forms of patient monitoring involving technology. Different forms of RPM have varying effectiveness, with researchers supporting more resources going towards developing technologies which counter the pitfalls of these methods.

== See also ==
- Biotelemetry
- eHealth
- mHealth
- Telehealth
