= Charles W. Engelhard Jr. =

American businessman (1917–1971)

- Born: February 15, 1917; New Jersey, U.S.
- Died: March 2, 1971 (aged 54); Boca Grande, Florida, U.S.
- Education: Princeton University; Oxford University
- Occupations: Industrialist, Racehorse owner
- Political party: Democrat
- Spouse: Jane Mannheimer (1947–1971; his death)
- Children: Anne Mannheimer-Engelhard; Susan Engelhard O'Connor; Jane Elizabeth Sophie Engelhard Craighead; Sally Engelhard; Charlene Engelhard Troy
- Parent: Charles W. Engelhard Sr.
- Military career
- Allegiance: United States
- Branch: United States Army
- Service years: November 7, 1941 – 1945
- Rank: Lieutenant

Charles William Engelhard Jr. (February 15, 1917 – March 2, 1971) was an American businessman, a major owner in Thoroughbred horse racing, and a candidate in the 1955 New Jersey State Senate elections. He controlled an international mining and metals conglomerate, Engelhard, founded by his father.

He has been described as the "Platinum King" and "the world's largest refiner and fabricator of platinum, gold and silver."

== Personal life ==
Engelhard grew up in a twelve-bedroom mansion in Bernardsville, New Jersey called Craigmore. He would say that he never once had a personal conversation with his "very Germanic" father Charles Engelhard Sr. He attended boarding schools in South Africa and Charterhouse School in England. In 1931, he graduated from Christ Church, Oxford University. In 1939, he graduated from Princeton University with a degree in history. During World War II, he served as a bomber pilot with the United States Army Air Forces. In 1947, Engelhard married the widow Jane Mannheimer. Engelhard would adopt Mannheimer's daughter, Anne France Mannheimer, and eventually have four more daughters with his wife.

Engelhard was obese and lived like an "Indian Rajah". According to board member Robert Zeller, he "would hold meetings...propped up in bed like a Sun King." He drank Coca-Cola and ate Hershey's Kisses to such an extent that it gave him gout.

== Politics ==
Charles Engelhard was a major contributor to the United States Democratic Party. In 1953, he was an early supporter of Robert B. Meyner's winning gubernatorial campaign. In 1955, he ran for New Jersey State Senate against Malcolm Forbes in the "Battle of the Billionaires", but lost 19,981 to 19,611, a thin margin of 370 votes. In the 1960 presidential election, he led the National Committee of Business and Professional Men and Women for Kennedy and Johnson.

Engelhard represented John F. Kennedy at the coronation of Pope Paul VI.

== Business ==
Engelhard's father began purchasing metals firms in 1902 with his wife's dowry. As a young man, Engelhard worked in the business, dealing in platinum, gold, and silver. Upon the death of his father in 1950, Charles Engelhard inherited a $20 million interest in the Engelhard Corporation and eventually grew it to over $200 million. He substantially expanded operations to South Africa, South America and Europe and built it into the world's leading refiner and fabricartor of precious metals. In 1958, he consolidated the various operating companies and issued a public share offering on the New York Stock Exchange. In 1961, Time described him as, "one of the most powerful businessmen in South Africa".

As a result of his company's need for gold acquisitions from South African suppliers, Engelhard became a major investor in the country, acquiring gold, copper and coal mining ventures as well as investing in industrial concerns. He set up a publicly traded holding company in the U.S. that raised capital for investments in South African business. The company made investments alone and in conjunction with South African business tycoon Harry Oppenheimer, whose Anglo American company dominated the South African mining industry. Engelhard maintained a residence in South Africa and was elected to Anglo American's Board of Directors. At home, he was criticized by students at Harvard and Rutgers for indirectly supporting the country's apartheid regime.

Engelhard Minerals had dealings with the silver empire of Nelson Bunker Hunt and W. Herbert Hunt and Japanese trading companies Mitsui and Mitsubishi through its trading arm Phillipp Brothers. The company remained very sizable for many years after Engelhard's death.

Shortly before his death in 1971, Engelhard disposed of most of his South African businesses, selling them to Anglo-American companies.

== Philanthropy ==
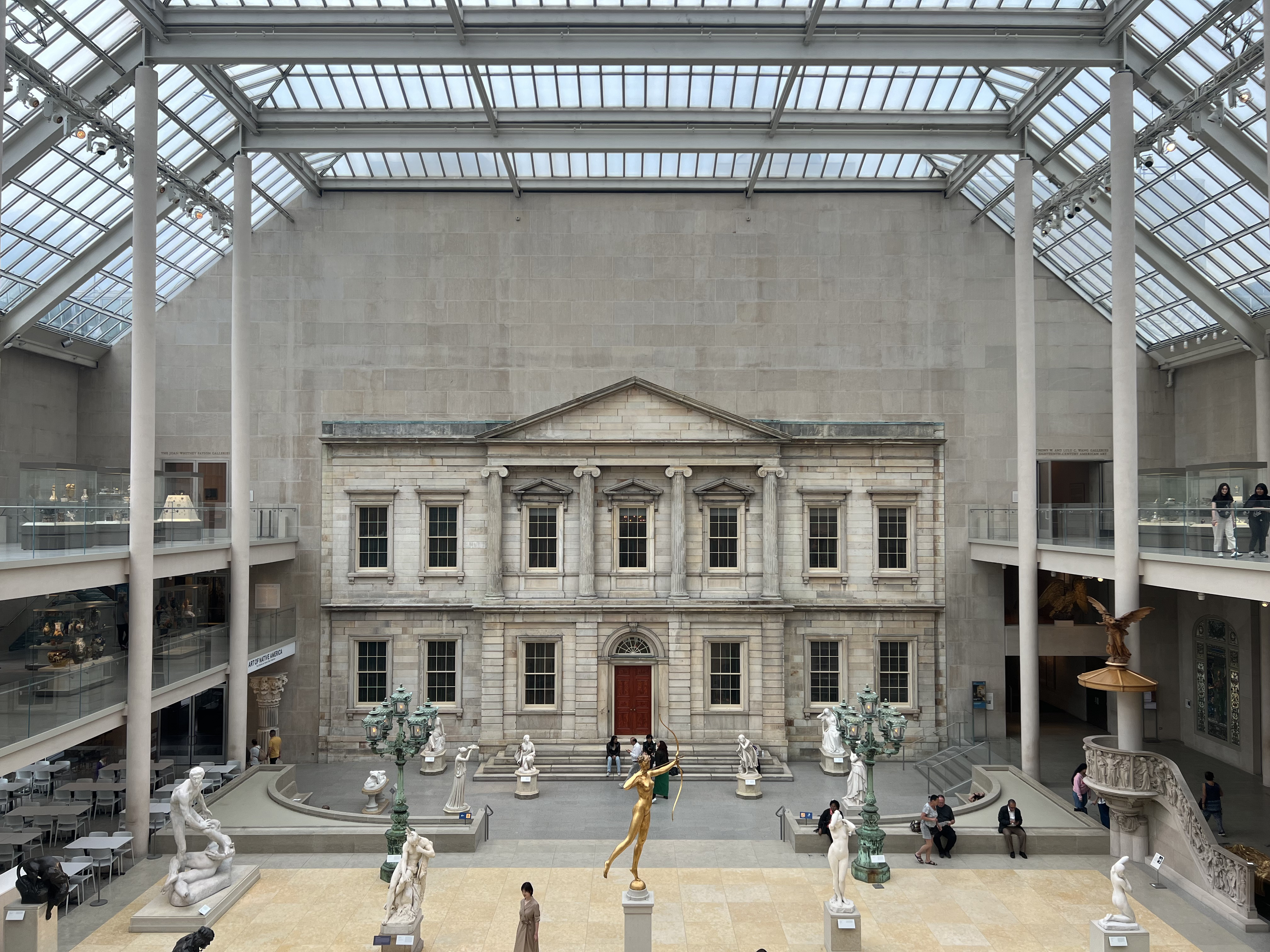
Charles Engelhard Court, Metropolitan Museum of Art, 2024

Charles Engelhard supported numerous humanitarian and benevolent causes in South Africa, the United Kingdom, and the United States. The Engelhard Dam on the Letaba River in Kruger National Park is named in his honor in gratitude for donations to the South African National Parks Board.

In 1969, Engelhard made a $1.25-million gift to Rutgers University Graduate School of Business Administration. As a result, a building on the Newark campus was named after him.

In 1970, Engelhard donated $500,000 to "Boystown" in Kearny, New Jersey. A dormitory and recreation center at the catholic charity center for boys was named after Engelhard.

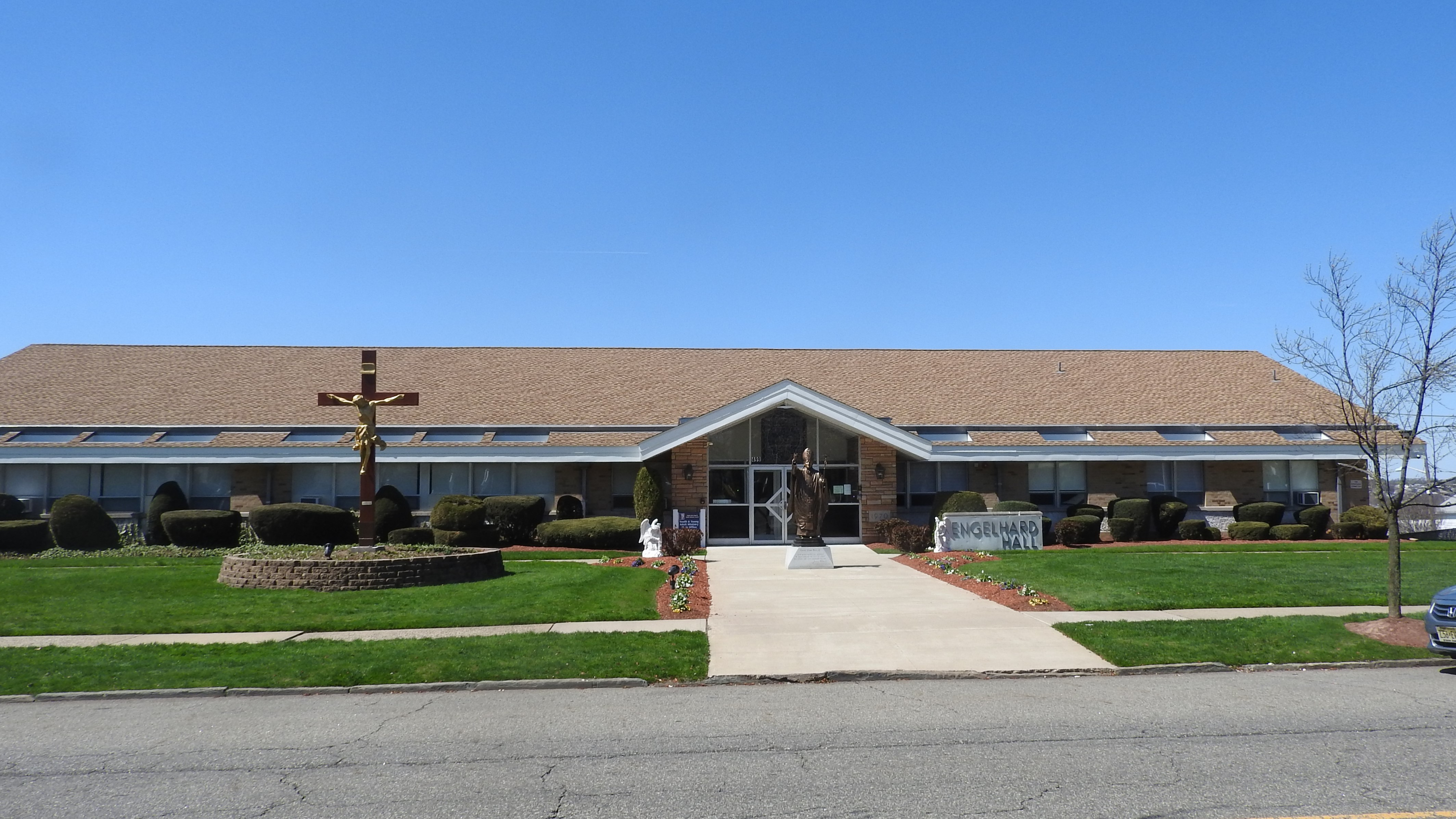
Engelhard Hall in Kearny, New Jersey

The Charles Engelhard Foundation, a 501(c)(3) tax-exempt private foundation headed by his wife after his death and by their children following her death in 2004, provides funding to a wide range of causes including education, medical research, cultural institutions, and wildlife and conservation organizations. It has made major donations to the Metropolitan Museum of Art where the Charles Engelhard Court can be found in its American Wing. The foundation built the library at Harvard University's John F. Kennedy School of Government. Anti-Apartheid protesters prevented the library from being named after him. and has been a generous supporter of a number of University of Montana academic programs. In 1967, he and his wife donated an elaborate 18th-century Neapolitan crêche to the White House.

There is an Engelhard Performing Arts Center (EPAC) and an Engelhard Family Library at the private high school The Potomac School in McLean, Virginia.

In 2018, Influence Watch reported that the foundation allocates money to "left-progressive" organizations including Tides Foundation, Planned Parenthood of the Rocky Mountains, National Wildlife Federation, and Natural Resources Defense Council.

== Cragwood Stables ==
Engelhard developed a love of Thoroughbred horse racing and became a major force in the industry with racing stables in England and South Africa, plus in Aiken, South Carolina where his Cragwood Stables was named for his estate in Far Hills, New Jersey. Primarily trained by future U.S. Racing Hall of Fame inductee MacKenzie Miller in the U.S., he raced notable horses such as Red Reality, Assagai, Tentam, Alley Fighter, and the U.S. Champion sire, Halo. His best known South African horse was Hawaii who won a number of important races in that country until being brought to compete in the U.S. in 1969 where he won several Grade 1 stakes and was voted the 1969 Eclipse Award for Outstanding Male Turf Horse. Following his death, his widow donated a large collection of racing trophies that were won by Cragwood horses in the U.S. between 1962 and 1976.

=== Nijinsky ===
While Engelhard was very successful racing Thoroughbreds in the United States, he and his wife also maintained a residence in London and it was in England where he had his greatest achievements in racing. His horses won British Classic Races six times including the St. Leger Stakes in 1964, 1967, 1968 and again in 1970 when he won it for the fourth time with the horse that brought him international fame and made him that year's British flat racing Champion Owner. Purchased at Windfields Farm's annual yearling sale in Ontario, Canada, Nijinsky was sent to Ireland to be conditioned by Vincent O'Brien. The colt earned Champion Two-Year-Old honors for his undefeated 1969 racing campaign. The next year, en route to being voted European Horse of the Year, Nijinsky won the 2,000 Guineas, The Derby, and the St. Leger Stakes to become the first horse in thirty-five years to win the English Triple Crown, and only narrowly failed to win the Prix de l'Arc de Triomphe by a short head to Sassafras. A 1970 motion picture was made about the colt titled A Horse Called Nijinsky and a 2000 Sun newspaper poll voted him Britain's Horse of the Millennium.

== Health and death ==
Engelhard died in 1971 of a heart attack in Boca Grande, Florida. His funeral mass was held on March 5 at St. Mary's Abbey Church at the Delbarton School in Morris County, New Jersey. Former president Lyndon Johnson acted as an honorary pall-bearer. Also in attendance were US senators Hubert Humphrey, Ted Kennedy, Mike Mansfield and Harrison A. Williams Jr., and former governors Robert B. Meyner and Richard J. Hughes.

== Inspiration for Goldfinger ==
Engelhard is reported by numerous sources, including Forbes and The New York Times, to have been the inspiration for the fictional character Auric Goldfinger in the Ian Fleming novel Goldfinger and the subsequent motion picture. Engelhard once attended a party in costume as Goldfinger.
