= Pingré =

Pingré may refer to:

== People ==
- Alexandre Guy Pingré (1711–1796), French astronomer and naval geographer

== Space ==
- 12719 Pingré, main belt asteroid with an orbital period of 1272
- Pingré (crater), lunar impact crater near the southwest limb of the Moon

== See also ==
- Pingree (disambiguation)
