= Jane Engelhard =

American philanthropist (1917–2004)

- Born: Mary Jane Reiss; August 12, 1917; Qingdao, China
- Died: February 29, 2004 (aged 86); Nantucket, Massachusetts, U.S.
- Occupation: Philanthropist
- Spouses: Fritz Mannheimer (m. 1939; died 1939) Charles W. Engelhard Jr. (m. 1947; died 1971)
- Children: Annette de la Renta (b. 1939)

Jane Engelhard (August 12, 1917 – February 29, 2004), born Mary Jane Reiss, was an American philanthropist, best known for her marriage to billionaire industrialist Charles W. Engelhard Jr., as well as her donation of an elaborate 18th-century Neapolitan crêche to the White House in 1967. She was named to the International Best Dressed List Hall of Fame in 1972.

== Family and early life ==
Born in Qingdao or Shanghai, China, Mary Jane Reiss was the youngest daughter of Hugo Reiss (1879–1931), a prominent Jewish businessman who emigrated to the USA in 1896; he was an executive at his family's British fabric-and-small-arms wholesale firm, G. Reiss & Co. Ltd. and served as Brazil's consul in Shanghai. Hugo Reiss married, at The Grand Hotel in Yokohama, Japan, on 16 October 1911, Marie Ignatius Murphy (1891-1965), an Irish Roman Catholic native of San Francisco, California; she was a daughter of James. J. Murphy and his wife, Mary O'Gorman.

Reiss had two elder sisters by her parents' marriage:

- Barry Jeannette Reiss, 1914–1970, later known as Reiss-Brian and Reis-Brian
- Madeleine Huguette Reiss, 1916–1994, later Reiss-Brian, married 1 Major Rupert Charles Frederick Gerard, and 2 Lawrence Hoguet
  - Anthony Gerard, 5th Baron Gerard of Bryn.

After her parents' divorce, her mother married French merchant and former theatre critic Guy Louis Albert Brian (1891–1955) in 1928. They had two daughters:

- Marie-Brigitte Brian (1928-), married Count Bernard de La Rochefoucauld Estissac
  - Anne Patricia de la Le Rochefoucauld Estissac
  - Edmond de la Le Rochefoucauld Estissac
  - Paul de la Le Rochefoucauld Estissac
  - Sabine de la Le Rochefoucauld Estissac, married Pierre Louis de la Rochefoucauld, Duc d'Estissac
  - Sophie Rose de la Le Rochefoucauld Estissac, a nun
- Patricia "Bébé" Brian (1930-), married Jacques Bemberg
  - Jean-Charles Bemberg
  - Marie Bemberg
  - Claude Bemberg

All five daughters were raised as Catholics, with the three Reiss girls spending their infancy and early childhood in Shanghai, China. After Marie (Murphy) Reiss separated from Reiss in the late 1920s, she and her children moved to Paris, where she remarried and where Jane graduated from Couvent des Oiseaux, a fashionable Roman Catholic school; its alumni included the future Vietnamese empress Nam Phương.

== First marriage ==
On 1 June 1939, at Villa Monte Cristo, Vaucresson, France, Reiss married Fritz Mannheimer (1890–1939), a German Jewish banker and art collector. The director of Mendelssohn & Co. in Amsterdam, a branch of a Berlin bank on Jagerstrasse 51, known for floating multimillion-dollar loans to various European governments, including that of Germany and Russia, he died eight weeks after the wedding, reportedly of a heart attack, on 9 August 1939. The actual cause of Mannheimer's death remains as speculative as its timing was suspicious. One day after his death, the Amsterdam branch announced that it was insolvent and that it was confiscating Mannheimer's art collection, which had been financed with unlimited bank credit. Shortly thereafter, the entire firm was liquidated by the German government.

The couple had one child, born in Nice, France, six months after Mannheimer's death:

- Anne France Mannheimer (now known as Annette de la Renta) (b. 1939)

== Second marriage ==
Jane Mannheimer moved first to London, then to Buenos Aires, then to New York City after her first husband's death. In 1947 she was named vice president of the merchandising division of Holbrook Microfilming Service, a company which was headed by president John J. Raskob and chairman Lt. Gen. Hugh Drum. She also was a member of Sillman & Associates, through which she was a minor investor in Broadway revues including New Shoes and Gentlemen Be Seated.

On 18 August 1947, in New York City, Mannheimer married Charles W. Engelhard Jr. (1917–1971), vice-president of Baker & Co. Inc. and heir to Engelhard Industries, a New Jersey–based minerals conglomerate. In 1950, he inherited an ownership stake in the Engelhard Minerals and Chemicals Corporation, the world's largest refiner and fabricator of platinum, gold and silver and the producer of the first catalytic converter.

The couple had numerous homes, including Cragwood, a 1920s neo-Georgian mansion in Far Hills, New Jersey, where they raised golden retrievers and thoroughbred racehorses, including the fabled Triple Crown of Thoroughbred Racing champion, Nijinsky. They also owned a country house in South Africa, and residences in London, Paris, Maine, Nantucket, New York City, and Quebec's Gaspé Peninsula.

The Engelhards had five daughters:

- Susan Mary Engelhard (married, in 1972, Roy Sayles O'Connor)
- Sophie Jane Engelhard (married Derek Craighead)
- Sally Alexandra Engelhard (married, in 1978, Sumner Pingree III)
- Charlene B. Engelhard (married, in 1985, John Troy)

Charles Engelhard also adopted his wife's daughter from her first marriage.

== Philanthropy ==
Engelhard was a patron of numerous causes and institutions, including the New Jersey Symphony. She served on the Boards the Metropolitan Museum of Art and the Morgan Library for many years. She also was a member of the Fine Arts Committee of the White House, organized during the Kennedy administration; the decoration of the Small State Dining Room is among her reported contributions to the restoration of the White House.

In 1977, Engelhard was the first woman appointed as a Commissioner of the Port Authority of New York and New Jersey. She was also a member of the Library of Congress Trust Fund Board and a recipient of the Legion d'honneur.

== Later life and death ==
Mrs. Engelhard sold off Cragwood and 10 impressionist paintings including two Monets and a Picasso in 1996 because she wanted to "simplify her life."

Engelhard died of pneumonia on February 29, 2004, at her home in Nantucket, Massachusetts.

== Sources ==
- "Fritz Mannheimer, Financier, Is Dead," The New York Times, 11 August 1939, page 19.
- "Action Follows Shortly After Mannheimer's Death–House Granted Government Loans," The New York Times, 12 August 1939, page 1.
- "Mendelssohn Lost Heavily on Bonds; Huge Fortune of Mannheimer Is Believed to Have Been Lost in His Operations ," The New York Times, 14 August 1939, page 7.
- "Trustees Named for Mendelssohn," The New York Times, 15 August 1939, page 32.
- "Holland Unmoved by Bank's Crisis," The New York Times, 21 August 1939, page 23.
- "Daladier Testifies in War Guilt Court," The New York Times, 23 September 1940, page 5.
- "Met Painting Traced to Nazis," The New York Times, 24 November 1987, page C19.
- "Records at the Met Disprove Charge of Acquiring 5 Paintings Improperly," The New York Times, 25 November 1987, C11.
- "Post-War Story," Time, 21 August 1939.
- Brief biography of Mannheimer
