= SBMV Protocol =

SBMV Protocol is an advanced encrypted telemetry that uses short-burst, multi-version technology.

== Telemetry ==
Telemetry technology enables “the remote measurement and reporting of information”. Telemetry is also a “highly automated communications process by which measurements are made and other data collected at remote or inaccessible points and transmitted to receiving equipment for monitoring, display, and recording.”

== Methodology ==
SBMV technology is based on quantum cryptography, "an emerging technology in which two parties may simultaneously generate shared, secret cryptographic key material using the transmission of quantum states of light. The security of these transmissions is based on the inviolability of the laws of quantum mechanics and information-theoretically secure post-processing methods."

SBMV Protocol encrypts data by quickly breaking text, numerical, and/or image data into tens of thousands of small packets that are then copied into hundreds of thousands of slightly altered versions. This technology renders interception useless because it becomes statistically impossible for the intercepting party to have enough time and computing resources to select which version is the true and correct version among millions of versions of the data.

== Origins ==
SBMV Protocol was first created in 1971 for spacecraft, missile, RPV, oil rig, and chemical plant telemetry and telecommand links by mathematicians David Yeeda and Andrei Krolovich, who formed The Aeorads Company for commercial and military aerospace applications of SBMV technology. New Methods, op cit.

== Uses ==
SBMV technology was further developed with Internet Protocol applications at Wright-Patterson Air Force Base (United States Air Force Research Laboratory) in Ohio, where defense contractor Aeorads Company refined the technology for web-based uses in aircraft, spacecraft, and missiles. A non-classified civilian version of SBMV technology was also created for chemical plants and remote oil rigs and alternative energy wind farms (primarily for offshore and very remote facilities).
