= Pingree =

Pingree is a surname. Notable people with the surname include:

- Chellie Pingree (born 1955), Representative to the U.S. House of Representatives for Maine's 1st District
- David Pingree (1933–2005), American historian of mathematics
- Hannah Pingree (born 1976), former Speaker of the Maine House of Representatives.
- Hazen S. Pingree (1840–1901), American politician
- Sally E. Pingree, American philanthropist
- Samuel E. Pingree (1832–1922), American politician and Civil War veteran

== See also ==
- Pingree Park, Colorado, mountain campus of Colorado State University
- Pingree School, coeducational, independent secondary day school near Boston, MA.
- Pingree, North Dakota, a place named after Hazen Pingree
