= Portable telemetry =

Portable telemetry system

The portable system for telemetry applications is a solution that gathers in a portable computer full functionalities and performances. Based on Data acquisition software, Portable Telemetry is an essential tool for the test engineer to run tests on-site.

== Function ==
Portable Telemetry system acquires, analyzes and visualizes data from PCM telemetry signal, whatever the format (IRIG, CCSDS, CE83). Portable Telemetry is defined in various configuration : laptop with PCMCIA cards, with PCI cards, or external USB modules. It provides all the functionality in the same working environment.

== Use ==
Portable Telemetry can be used in various applications such as:

- Missile applications
- J.A.V Applications
- Aircraft / Flight testing
- Space
