= Medical Device Radiocommunications Service =

Wireless specification for communication between medical devices

The Medical Device Radiocommunications Service (MedRadio) is a specification and communication spectrum created for and set aside by the U.S. Federal Communications Commission (FCC) for the communication needs of diagnostic and therapeutic medical implants and body-worn medical devices. Devices operating on MedRadio include cardiac pacemakers, defibrillators, neuromuscular stimulators, and drug delivery systems. As of February 2016, communications spectrum for these and other similar devices is set aside at various points in the 400 MHz frequency band, as well as the 2360-2400 MHz band, though specifically for medical body area network (MBAN) devices. The specification supersedes and incorporates a previous specification called the Medical Implant Communication Service (MICS).

The specification and nearly identical spectrum have also been created by the European Telecommunications Standards Institute (ETSI), with the specification largely referred to as MICS/MEDS (Medical Data Service) in Europe and other parts of the world.

== History ==
The FCC created the Medical Implant Communication Service (MICS) in 1999 "in response to a petition for rule making by [Medtronic, Inc.] to permit use of a mobile radio device, implanted in a patient, for transmitting data in support of the diagnostic and/or therapeutic functions associated with an implanted medical device." This set aside the 402–405 MHz band and designated a low maximum transmit power, EIRP=25 microwatt, in order to reduce the risk of interfering with other users of the same band. Ten channels of 300 kHz each were assigned to the bandwidth. MICS provided additional flexibility to medical device developers compared to previously used inductive technologies, which required the external transceiver to touch the skin of the patient. MICS was later adopted by the ETSI in 2002.

In 2006, the FCC reevaluated the spectrum requirements at the prompting of Medtronic, which sought to expand the spectrum "to support advances in medical sensor technology and the expected proliferation of such devices, especially those used for lower-cost medical monitoring and non-emergency reporting applications." A similar process was initiated by the ETSI in Europe in July 2004, with both the FCC and ETSI considering the 401–402 and 405–406 MHz ranges. The ETSI formalized the proposal into a standard called MEDS (with the core MICS bands remaining under that name and the new "wing" bands being referred to as MEDS) in December 2007, while the FCC added the same additional spectrum to MICS and dubbed the expanded plan the Medical Device Radiocommunications Service or MedRadio in May 2009. The FCC expanded MedRadio's spectrum again in November 2011, adding 24 megahertz in the 413-419 MHz, 426-432 MHz, 438-444 MHz, and 451-457 MHz ranges as part of an "effort to recognize and facilitate the significant advances in wireless medical technologies that are revolutionizing treatment for a wide variety of medical conditions."

The FCC allocated additional spectrum (2360-2400 MHz) specifically for MBAN devices in May 2012, effective on October 10, citing "significant public interest benefits associated with the development and deployment" of MBAN devices. Additional modifications to the MBAN rules were released in August 2014, including the "narrowing [of] the definition of health care facilities that may use MBAN devices in the 2360-2390 MHz band" and relaxing MBAN network topology restrictions among others.

== Operational parameters ==
In the United States, the FCC states that:

- MedRadio devices can only be operated by an authorized health care providers such as a physician or legally authorized entity able "to provide health care services using medical implant devices";
- MedRadio device manufacturers and representatives can only operate the device "for the purpose of demonstrating, installing and maintaining the equipment" for authorized health care providers; and
- MedRadio devices are only "authorized on a secondary status" and must accept any interference created by devices of primary status.

Operational parameters in other parts of the world may vary slightly based on local law. In Canada, for example, devices that fall under the MEDS standard also fall under secondary status, but they are classified nationally as Category I equipment that require a technical acceptance certificate (TAC) or equally recognized certificate before they can be used.

== See also ==
- Wireless Medical Telemetry Service
