= Elliot Philipp =

British obstetrician and gynaecologist

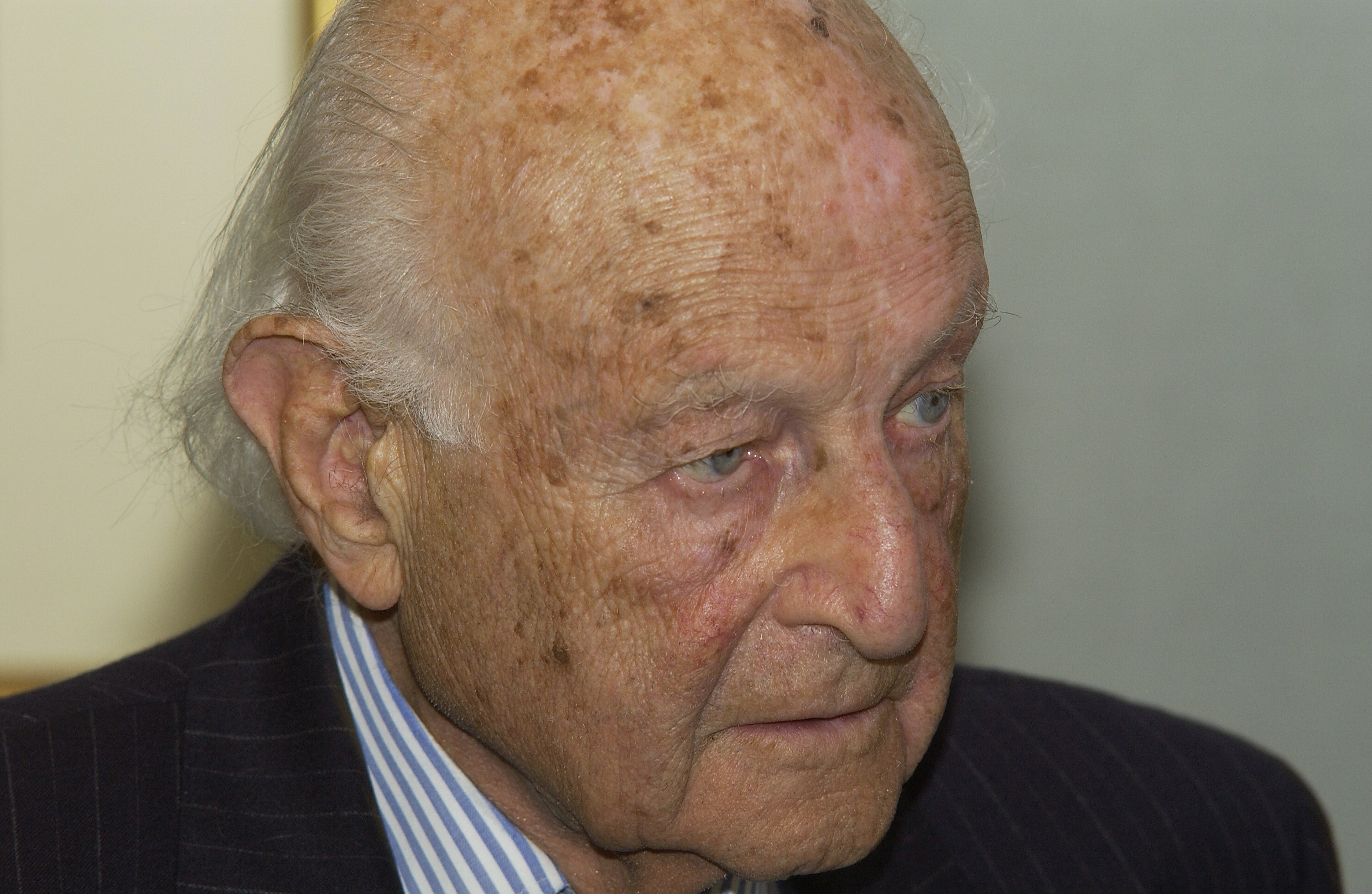
- Philipp in 2003
- Born: Elliot Elias Philipp; 20 July 1915; Stoke Newington, London, England
- Died: 27 September 2010 (aged 95)
- Spouse: Lucie Hackenbroch
- Parent: Oscar Philipp
- Family: Julius Philipp (uncle)

Elliot Elias Philipp (20 July 1915 – 27 September 2010) was a British gynaecologist and obstetrician who worked with Patrick Steptoe and Robert Edwards in developing in-vitro fertilisation and authored The Technique of Sex (1939) with the assistance of Sigmund Freud.

== Biography ==
Phillip was born to a Jewish family in Stoke Newington, the son of Clarisse (née Weil) and Oscar Philipp. His father - who was a cousin to Martha Bernays, the wife of Sigmund Freud - immigrated in 1908 to London from Hamburg to set up the metal trading firm Philipp Brothers. Philipp retired from the National Health Service in 1980 but still saw private patients in Harley Street and operated until the age of 77.

== Personal life ==
In 1939, he married Lucie Ruth Hackenbroch; they had two children, Ann Susan Philipp (1941–1997) and Alan Henry Philipp.
