= Biotelemetry =

Biotelemetry (or medical telemetry) involves the application of telemetry in biology, medicine, and other health care to remotely monitor various vital signs of ambulatory patients.

== Application ==
The most common usage for biotelemetry is in dedicated cardiac care telemetry units or step-down units in hospitals. Although virtually any physiological signal could be transmitted, application is typically limited to cardiac monitoring and SpO2.

Biotelemetry is increasingly being used to understand animals and wildlife by remotely measuring physiology, behaviour and energetic status. It can be used to understand the way that animals migrate, and also the environment that they are experiencing by measuring the abiotic variables, and how it is affecting their physiological status by measuring biotic variables such as heart rate and temperature. Telemetry systems can either be attached externally to animals, or placed internally, with the types of transmission for the devices dependent on the environment that the animal moves in. For example, to study the movement of swimming animals signals using radio transmission or ultrasonic transmission are often used but land based or flying animals can be tracked with GPS and satellite transmissions.

== Components of a biotelemetry system ==
A typical biotelemetry system comprises:

- Sensors appropriate for the particular signals to be monitored
- Battery-powered, Patient worn transmitters
- A Radio Antenna and Receiver
- A display unit capable of concurrently presenting information from multiple patients

== History ==
Some of the first uses of biotelemetry systems date to the early space race, where physiological signals obtained from animals or human passengers were transmitted back to Earth for analysis (the name of the medical device manufacturer Spacelabs Healthcare is a reflection of their start in 1958 developing biotelemetry systems for the early U.S. space program).

Animal biotelemetry has been used since at least the 1980s. Animal biotelemetry has now advanced to not only understand the physiology and movement of free ranging animals, but also how different animals interact, for example, between predators and prey.

== Current trends ==
Because of the crowding of the radio spectrum due to the recent introduction of digital television in the United States and many other countries, the Federal Communications Commission (FCC) as well as similar agencies elsewhere have recently begun to allocate dedicated frequency bands for exclusive biotelemetry usage, for example, the Wireless Medical Telemetry Service (WMTS). The FCC has designated the American Society for Healthcare Engineering of the American Hospital Association (ASHE/AHA) as the frequency coordinator for the WMTS.

In addition, there are many products that utilize commonly available standard radio devices such as Bluetooth and IEEE 802.11.

== See also ==
- Battlefield medicine
- Heart rate monitor
- Remote physiological monitoring
- Remote patient monitoring
