= Philippin =

Philippin is a surname derived from Philipp. Notable people with the surname include:

- Jules Philippin (1818–1882), Swiss politician
- Sybille Philippin (born 1970), German mezzo-soprano
