= Telemetry =

Automatic collection and transmission of data

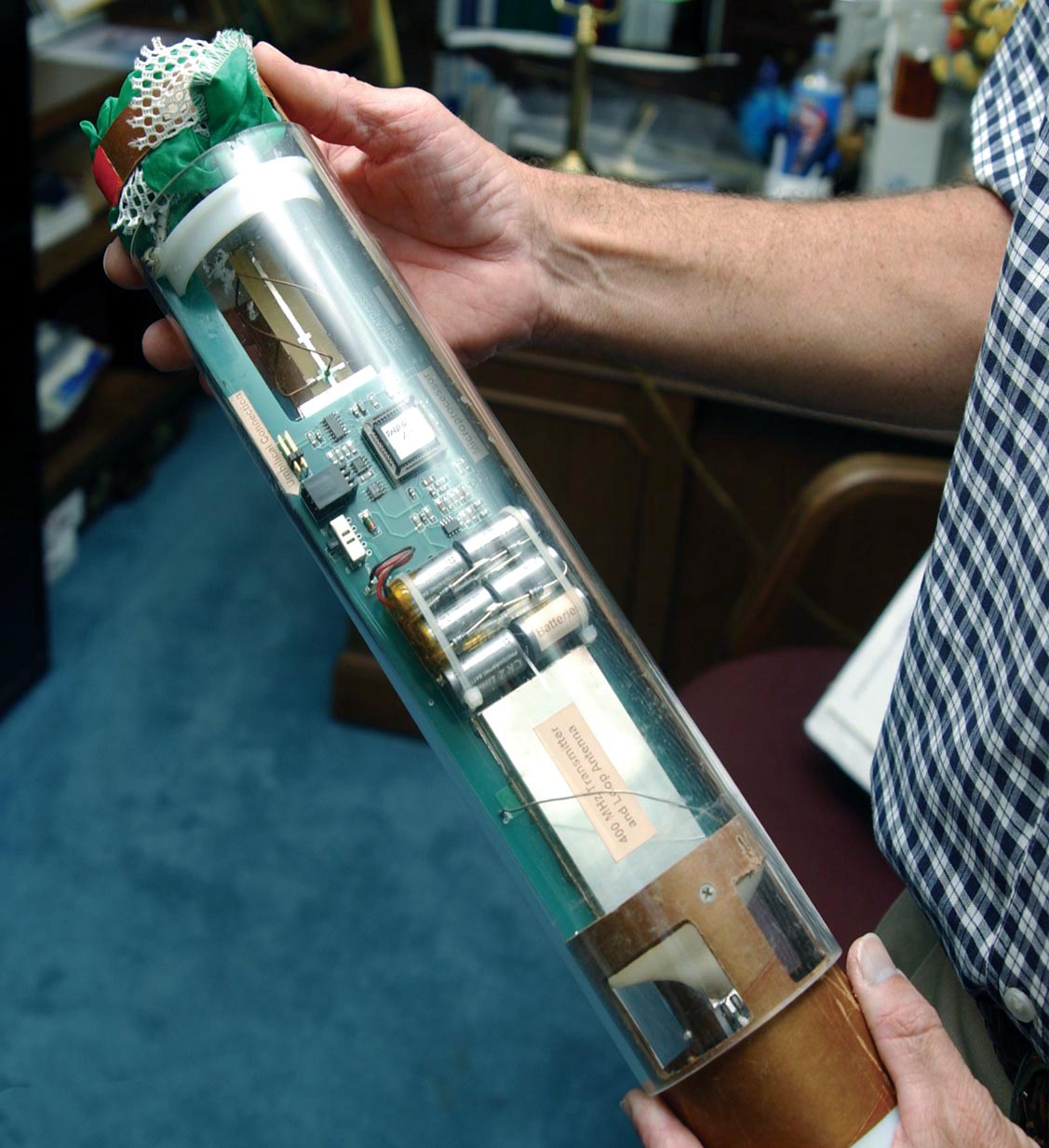
An expendable dropsonde used to capture weather data. The telemetry consists of sensors for pressure, temperature, and humidity and a wireless transmitter to return the captured data to an aircraft.

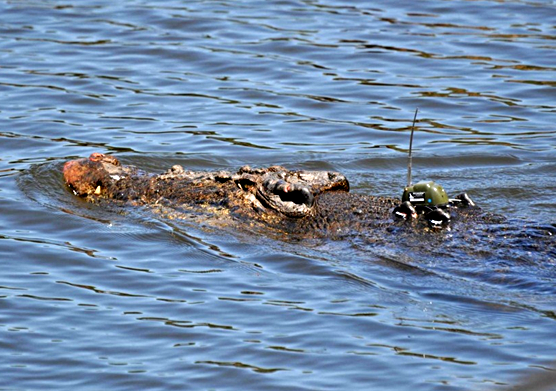
A saltwater crocodile with a GPS-based satellite transmitter attached to its head for tracking

Telemetry is the in situ collection of measurements or other data at remote points and their automatic transmission to receiving equipment (telecommunication) for monitoring. The word is derived from the Greek roots tele, 'far off', and metron, 'measure'. Systems that need external instructions and data to operate require the counterpart of telemetry: telecommand.

Although the term commonly refers to wireless data transfer mechanisms (e.g., using radio, ultrasonic, or infrared systems), it also encompasses data transferred over other media such as a telephone or computer network, optical link or other wired communications like power line carriers. Many modern telemetry systems take advantage of the low cost and ubiquity of GSM networks by using SMS to receive and transmit telemetry data.

A telemeter is a physical device used in telemetry. It consists of a sensor, a transmission path, and a display, recording, or control device. Electronic devices are widely used in telemetry and can be wireless or hard-wired, analog or digital. Other technologies are also possible, such as mechanical, hydraulic and optical.

Telemetry may be commutated to allow the transmission of multiple data streams in a fixed frame.

== History ==
The beginning of industrial telemetry lies in the steam age, although the sensor was not called telemeter at that time. Examples are James Watt's (1736-1819) additions to his steam engines for monitoring from a (near) distance such as the mercury pressure gauge and the fly-ball governor.

Although the original telemeter referred to a ranging device (the rangefinding telemeter), by the late 19th century the same term had been in wide use by electrical engineers applying it refer to electrically operated devices measuring many other quantities besides distance (for instance, in the patent of an "Electric Telemeter Transmitter"). General telemeters included such sensors as the thermocouple (from the work of Thomas Johann Seebeck), the resistance thermometer (by William Siemens based on the work of Humphry Davy), and the electrical strain gauge (based on Lord Kelvin's discovery that conductors under mechanical strain change their resistance) and output devices such as Samuel Morse's telegraph sounder and the relay. In 1889 this led an author in the Institution of Civil Engineers proceedings to suggest that the term for the rangefinder telemeter might be replaced with tacheometer.

In the 1930s use of electrical telemeters grew rapidly. The electrical strain gauge was widely used in rocket and aviation research and the radiosonde was invented for meteorological measurements. The advent of World War II gave an impetus to industrial development and henceforth many of these telemeters became commercially viable.

Carrying on from rocket research, radio telemetry was used routinely as space exploration got underway. Spacecraft are in a place where a physical connection is not possible, leaving radio or other electromagnetic waves (such as infrared lasers) as the only viable option for telemetry. During crewed space missions it is used to monitor not only parameters of the vehicle, but also the health and life support of the astronauts. During the Cold War telemetry found uses in espionage. US intelligence found that they could monitor the telemetry from Soviet missile tests by building a telemeter of their own to intercept the radio signals and hence learn a great deal about Soviet capabilities.

=== Types of telemeter ===
Telemeters are the physical devices used in telemetry. It consists of a sensor, a transmission path, and a display, recording, or control device. Electronic devices are widely used in telemetry and can be wireless or hard-wired, analog or digital. Other technologies are also possible, such as mechanical, hydraulic and optical.

Telemetering information over wire had its origins in the 19th century. One of the first data-transmission circuits was developed in 1845 between the Russian Tsar's Winter Palace and army headquarters. In 1874, French engineers built a system of weather and snow-depth sensors on Mont Blanc that transmitted real-time information to Paris. In 1901 the American inventor C. Michalke patented the selsyn, a circuit for sending synchronized rotation information over a distance. In 1906 a set of seismic stations were built with telemetering to the Pulkovo Observatory in Russia. In 1912, Commonwealth Edison developed a system of telemetry to monitor electrical loads on its power grid. The Panama Canal (completed 1913–1914) used extensive telemetry systems to monitor locks and water levels.

Wireless telemetry made early appearances in the radiosonde, developed concurrently in 1930 by Robert Bureau in France and Pavel Molchanov in Russia. Molchanov's system modulated temperature and pressure measurements by converting them to wireless Morse code. The German V-2 rocket used a system of primitive multiplexed radio signals called "Messina" to report four rocket parameters, but it was so unreliable that Wernher von Braun once claimed it was more useful to watch the rocket through binoculars.

In the US and the USSR, the Messina system was quickly replaced with better systems; in both cases, based on pulse-position modulation (PPM). Early Soviet missile and space telemetry systems which were developed in the late 1940s used either PPM (e.g., the Tral telemetry system developed by OKB-MEI) or pulse-duration modulation (e.g., the RTS-5 system developed by NII-885). In the United States, early work employed similar systems, but were later replaced by pulse-code modulation (PCM) (for example, in the Mars probe Mariner 4). Later Soviet interplanetary probes used redundant radio systems, transmitting telemetry by PCM on a decimeter band and PPM on a centimeter band.

== Applications ==
=== Meteorology ===
Weather balloons use telemetry to transmit meteorological data since 1920.

=== Oil and gas industry ===
Telemetry is used to transmit drilling mechanics and formation evaluation information uphole, in real time, as a well is drilled. These services are known as Measurement while drilling and Logging while drilling. Information acquired thousands of feet below ground, while drilling, is sent through the drilling hole to the surface sensors and the demodulation software. The pressure wave (sana) is translated into useful information after DSP and noise filters. This information is used for Formation evaluation, Drilling Optimization, and Geosteering.

=== Motor racing ===
Telemetry is a key factor in modern motor racing, allowing race engineers to interpret data collected during a test or race and use it to properly tune the car for optimum performance. Systems used in series such as Formula One have become advanced to the point where the potential lap time of the car can be calculated, and this time is what the driver is expected to meet. Examples of measurements on a race car include accelerations (G forces) in three axes, temperature readings, wheel speed, and suspension displacement. In Formula One, driver input is also recorded so the team can assess driver performance and (in case of an accident) the FIA can determine or rule out driver error as a possible cause.

Later developments include two-way telemetry which allows engineers to update calibrations on the car in real time (even while it is out on the track). In Formula One, two-way telemetry surfaced in the early 1990s and consisted of a message display on the dashboard which the team could update. Its development continued until May 2001, when it was first allowed on the cars. By 2002, teams were able to change engine mapping and deactivate engine sensors from the pit while the car was on the track. For the 2003 season, the FIA banned two-way telemetry from Formula One; however, the technology may be used in other types of racing or on road cars.

One way telemetry system has also been applied in R/C racing car to get information by car's sensors like: engine RPM, voltage, temperatures, throttle.

=== Transportation ===
In the transportation industry, telemetry provides meaningful information about a vehicle or driver's performance by collecting data from sensors within the vehicle. This is undertaken for various reasons ranging from staff compliance monitoring, insurance rating to predictive maintenance.

Telemetry is used to link traffic counter devices to data recorders to measure traffic flows and vehicle lengths and weights.

Telemetry is used by the railway industry for measuring the health of trackage. This permits optimized and focused predictive and preventative maintenance. Typically this is done with specialized trains, such as the New Measurement Train used in the United Kingdom by Network Rail, which can check for track defects, such as problems with gauge, and deformations in the rail. Japan uses similar, but quicker trains, nicknamed Doctor Yellow. Such trains, besides checking the tracks, can also verify whether or not there are any problems with the overhead power supply (catenary), where it is installed. Dedicated rail inspection companies, such as Sperry Rail, have their own customized rail cars and rail-wheel equipped trucks, that use a variety of methods, including lasers, ultrasound, and induction (measuring resulting magnetic fields from running electricity into rails) to find any defects.

=== Agriculture ===
Most activities related to healthy crops and good yields depend on timely availability of weather and soil data. Therefore, wireless weather stations play a major role in disease prevention and precision irrigation. These stations transmit parameters necessary for decision-making to a base station: air temperature and relative humidity, precipitation and leaf wetness (for disease prediction models), solar radiation and wind speed (to calculate evapotranspiration), water deficit stress (WDS) leaf sensors and soil moisture (crucial to irrigation decisions).

Because local micro-climates can vary significantly, such data needs to come from within the crop. Monitoring stations usually transmit data back by terrestrial radio, although occasionally satellite systems are used. Solar power is often employed to make the station independent of the power grid.

=== Water management ===
Telemetry is important in water management, including water quality and stream gauging functions. Major applications include AMR (automatic meter reading), groundwater monitoring, leak detection in distribution pipelines and equipment surveillance. Having data available in almost real time allows quick reactions to events in the field. Telemetry control allows engineers to intervene with assets such as pumps and by remotely switching pumps on or off depending on the circumstances. Watershed telemetry is an excellent strategy of how to implement a water management system.

=== Defense, space and resource exploration ===
Telemetry is used in complex systems such as missiles, RPVs, spacecraft, oil rigs, and chemical plants since it allows the automatic monitoring, alerting, and record-keeping necessary for efficient and safe operation. Space agencies such as NASA, ISRO, the European Space Agency (ESA), and other agencies use telemetry and/or telecommand systems to collect data from spacecraft and satellites.

Telemetry is vital in the development of missiles, satellites and aircraft because the system might be destroyed during or after the test. Engineers need critical system parameters to analyze (and improve) the performance of the system. In the absence of telemetry, this data would often be unavailable.

==== Space science ====
Telemetry is used by crewed or uncrewed spacecraft for data transmission. Distances of more than 25.1 billion kilometers (May 2025) have been covered, e.g., by Voyager 1.

==== Rocketry ====
In rocketry, telemetry equipment forms an integral part of the rocket range assets used to monitor the position and health of a launch vehicle to determine range safety flight termination criteria (Range purpose is for public safety). Problems include the extreme environment (temperature, acceleration and vibration), the energy supply, antenna alignment and (at long distances, e.g., in spaceflight) signal travel time.

==== Flight testing ====
Today nearly every type of aircraft, missiles, or spacecraft carries a wireless telemetry system as it is tested. Aeronautical mobile telemetry is used for the safety of the pilots and persons on the ground during flight tests. Telemetry from an on-board flight test instrumentation system is the primary source of real-time measurement and status information transmitted during the testing of crewed and uncrewed aircraft.

==== Military intelligence ====
Intercepted telemetry was an important source of intelligence for the United States and UK when Soviet missiles were tested; for this purpose, the United States operated a listening post in Iran. Eventually, the Russians discovered the United States intelligence-gathering network and encrypted their missile-test telemetry signals. Telemetry was also a source for the Soviets, who operated listening ships in Cardigan Bay to eavesdrop on UK missile tests performed in the area.

=== Energy monitoring ===
In factories, buildings and houses, energy consumption of systems such as HVAC are monitored at multiple locations; related parameters (e.g., temperature) are sent via wireless telemetry to a central location. The information is collected and processed, enabling the most efficient use of energy. Such systems also facilitate predictive maintenance.

=== Resource distribution ===
Many resources need to be distributed over wide areas. Telemetry is useful in these cases, since it allows the logistics system to channel resources where they are needed, as well as provide security for those assets; principal examples of this are dry goods, fluids, and granular bulk solids.

==== Dry goods ====
Dry goods, such as packaged merchandise, may be tracked and remotely monitored, tracked and inventoried by RFID sensing systems, barcode reader, optical character recognition (OCR) reader, or other sensing devices—coupled to telemetry devices, to detect RFID tags, barcode labels or other identifying markers affixed to the item, its package, or (for large items and bulk shipments) affixed to its shipping container or vehicle. This facilitates knowledge of their location, and can record their status and disposition, as when merchandise with barcode labels is scanned through a checkout reader at point-of-sale systems in a retail store. Stationary or hand-held barcode RFID scanners or Optical reader with remote communications, can be used to expedite inventory tracking and counting in stores, warehouses, shipping terminals, transportation carriers and factories.

==== Fluids ====
Fluids stored in tanks are a principal object of constant commercial telemetry. This typically includes monitoring of tank farms in gasoline refineries and chemical plants—and distributed or remote tanks, which must be replenished when empty (as with gas station storage tanks, home heating oil tanks, or ag-chemical tanks at farms), or emptied when full (as with production from oil wells, accumulated waste products, and newly produced fluids). Telemetry is used to communicate the variable measurements of flow and tank level sensors detecting fluid movements and/or volumes by pneumatic, hydrostatic, or differential pressure; tank-confined ultrasonic, radar or Doppler effect echoes; or mechanical or magnetic sensors.

==== Bulk solids ====
Telemetry of bulk solids is common for tracking and reporting the volume status and condition of grain and livestock feed bins, powdered or granular food, powders and pellets for manufacturing, sand and gravel, and other granular bulk solids. While technology associated with fluid tank monitoring also applies, in part, to granular bulk solids, reporting of overall container weight, or other gross characteristics and conditions, are sometimes required, owing to bulk solids' more complex and variable physical characteristics.

=== Medicine/healthcare ===
Telemetry is used for patients (biotelemetry) who are at risk of abnormal heart activity, generally in a coronary care unit. Telemetry specialists are sometimes used to monitor many patients within a hospital. Such patients are outfitted with measuring, recording and transmitting devices. A data log can be useful in diagnosis of the patient's condition by doctors. An alerting function can alert nurses if the patient is suffering from an acute (or dangerous) condition.

Systems are available in medical-surgical nursing for monitoring to rule out a heart condition, or to monitor a response to antiarrhythmic medications such as amiodarone.

A new and emerging application for telemetry is in the field of neurophysiology, or neurotelemetry. Neurophysiology is the study of the central and peripheral nervous systems through the recording of bioelectrical activity, whether spontaneous or stimulated. In neurotelemetry (NT) the electroencephalogram (EEG) of a patient is monitored remotely by a registered EEG technologist using advanced communication software. The goal of neurotelemetry is to recognize a decline in a patient's condition before physical signs and symptoms are present.

Neurotelemetry is synonymous with real-time continuous video EEG monitoring and has application in the epilepsy monitoring unit, neuro ICU, pediatric ICU and newborn ICU. Due to the labor-intensive nature of continuous EEG monitoring NT is typically done in the larger academic teaching hospitals using in-house programs that include R.EEG Technologists, IT support staff, neurologist and neurophysiologist and monitoring support personnel.

Modern microprocessor speeds, software algorithms and video data compression allow hospitals to centrally record and monitor continuous digital EEGs of multiple critically ill patients simultaneously.

Neurotelemetry and continuous EEG monitoring provides dynamic information about brain function that permits early detection of changes in neurologic status, which is especially useful when the clinical examination is limited.

=== Fishery and wildlife research and management ===
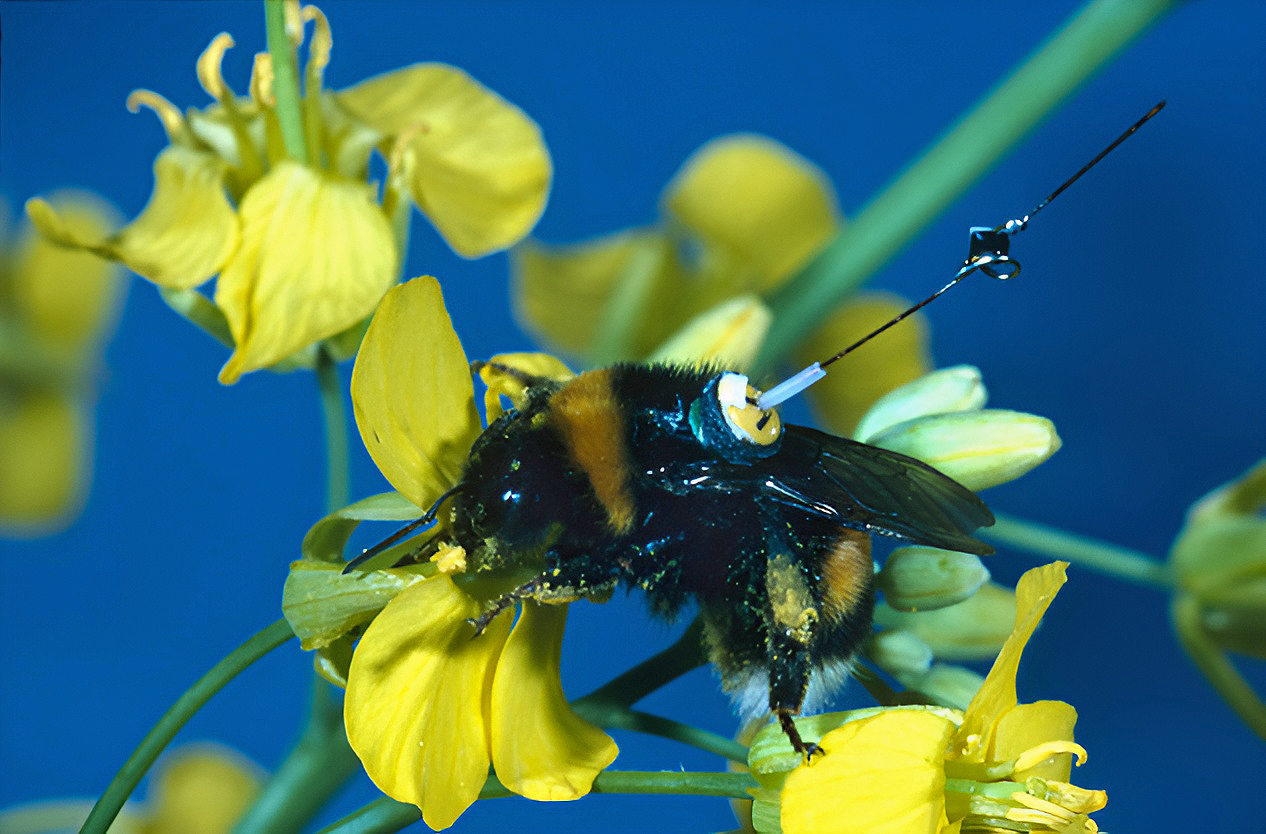
A bumblebee worker with a transponder attached to its back, visiting an oilseed rape flower

Telemetry is used to study wildlife, and has been useful for monitoring threatened species at the individual level. Animals under study can be outfitted with instrumentation tags, which include sensors that measure temperature, diving depth and duration (for marine animals), speed and location (using GPS or Argos packages). Telemetry tags can give researchers information about animal behavior, functions, and their environment. This information is then either stored (with archival tags) or the tags can send (or transmit) their information to a satellite or handheld receiving device. Capturing and marking wild animals can put them at some risk, so it is important to minimize these impacts.

=== Retail ===
At a 2005 workshop in Las Vegas, a seminar noted the introduction of telemetry equipment which would allow vending machines to communicate sales and inventory data to a route truck or to a headquarters. This data could be used for a variety of purposes, such as eliminating the need for drivers to make a first trip to see which items needed to be restocked before delivering the inventory.

Retailers also use RFID tags to track inventory and prevent shoplifting. Most of these tags passively respond to RFID readers (e.g., at the cashier), but active RFID tags are available which periodically transmit location information to a base station.

=== Law enforcement ===
Telemetry hardware is useful for tracking persons and property in law enforcement. An ankle collar worn by convicts on probation can warn authorities if a person violates the terms of his or her parole, such as by straying from authorized boundaries or visiting an unauthorized location. Telemetry has also enabled bait cars, where law enforcement can rig a car with cameras and tracking equipment and leave it somewhere they expect it to be stolen. When stolen the telemetry equipment reports the location of the vehicle, enabling law enforcement to deactivate the engine and lock the doors when it is stopped by responding officers.

=== Energy providers ===
In some countries, telemetry is used to measure the amount of electrical energy consumed. The electricity meter communicates with a concentrator, and the latter sends the information through GPRS or GSM to the energy provider's server. Telemetry is also used for the remote monitoring of substations and their equipment. For data transmission, phase line carrier systems operating on frequencies between 30 and 400 kHz are sometimes used.

=== Falconry ===
In falconry, "telemetry" means a small radio transmitter carried by a bird of prey that will allow the bird's owner to track it when it is out of sight.

=== Testing ===
Telemetry is used in testing hostile environments which are dangerous to humans. Examples include munitions storage facilities, radioactive sites, volcanoes, deep sea, and outer space.

=== Communications ===
Telemetry is used in many battery operated wireless systems to inform monitoring personnel when the battery power is reaching a low point and the end item needs fresh batteries.

=== Mining ===
In the mining industry, telemetry serves two main purposes: the measurement of key parameters from mining equipment and the monitoring of safety practices. The information provided by the collection and analysis of key parameters allows for root-cause identification of inefficient operations, unsafe practices and incorrect equipment usage for maximizing productivity and safety. Further applications of the technology allow for sharing knowledge and best practices across the organization.

=== Software ===
In software, telemetry is used to gather data on the use and performance of applications and application components, e.g. how often certain features are used, measurements of start-up time and processing time, hardware, application crashes, and general usage statistics and/or user behavior. In some cases, very detailed data is reported like individual window metrics, counts of used features, and individual function timings.

This kind of telemetry can be essential to software developers to receive data from a wide variety of endpoints that can't possibly all be tested in-house, as well as getting data on the popularity of certain features and whether they should be given priority or be considered for removal. Due to concerns about privacy since software telemetry can easily be used to profile users, telemetry in user software is often user choice, commonly presented as an opt-out feature (requiring explicit user action to disable it) or user choice during the software installation process.

== International standards ==
As in other telecommunications fields, international standards exist for telemetry equipment and software. International standards producing bodies include Consultative Committee for Space Data Systems (CCSDS) for space agencies, Inter-Range Instrumentation Group (IRIG) for missile ranges, and Telemetering Standards Coordination Committee (TSCC), an organisation of the International Foundation for Telemetering.

== See also ==
- Data collection satellite
- Instrumentation
- Machine to Machine (M2M)
- MQ Telemetry Transport (MQTT)
- Portable telemetry
- Reconnaissance satellite, tapping of communications routing or switching centers (e.g., Echelon)
- Remote monitoring and control
- Remote sensing
- Remote Terminal Unit (RTU)
- SBMV Protocol
- SCADA
- Telecommand
- Telematics
- Wireless sensor network
