= Julius Philipp =

German-born metal trader who co-founded Philipp Brothers

- Born: Julius Philipp; 1 March 1878; Hamburg, German Empire
- Died: 15 March 1944 (aged 66); Bergen-Belsen concentration camp, Nazi Germany
- Occupation: Metal trader
- Known for: Co-founder of Philipp Brothers
- Family: Oscar Philipp (brother); Elliot Philipp (nephew); Martha Bernays (cousin)

Julius Philipp (1 March 1878 – 15 March 1944) was a German-born metal trader who co-founded Philipp Brothers.

== Biography ==
Julius Philipp was born to an Orthodox Jewish family in Germany. He was a cousin to Martha Bernays, the wife of Sigmund Freud. In 1901, he founded a small metal trading company in Hamburg, Germany. In 1909, Philipp and his younger brother, Oscar Philipp established a metal trading company in London under the name of Philipp Brothers. Julius continued to run the German operation out of Hamburg. In 1914, with the advent of World War I, Siegfried Bendheim, an apprentice, German citizen, and minor partner in Philipp Brothers, avoided internment by the British government by moving to New York City where he established Philipp Brothers, Inc. Oscar Philipp was not affected by the war as he had previously obtained British citizenship. In 1923, another apprentice and second cousin to Bendheim, Siegfried Ullmann, moved to the New York office. In 1934, Julius moved Philipp Brothers' German operations to Amsterdam due to the rise of Nazi Germany. In 1944, he died in the Bergen-Belsen concentration camp. The New York office eventually became Philipp Brothers headquarters.
