= Sally E. Pingree =

American philanthropist

Sally Engelhard Pingree is an American philanthropist and a daughter of the industrialist Charles W. Engelhard Jr. and his wife, Jane (the former Marie Annette Reiss Mannheimer). Pingree is a sister-in-law of fashion designer Oscar de la Renta.

She is a trustee of the Charles Engelhard Foundation and is known for her contributions to progressive environmental, social, and educational causes. She has also been a major political donor to Democratic Party causes, including that of her former sister-in-law Chellie Pingree.

Pingree served on boards at Boston College, the Carter Center, National Geographic Society, and St. Andrew's School. She is a graduate of Foxcroft School and Trinity College. She has two children and lives in Washington, D.C.

Pingree is divorced from Sumner Pingree III, whom she married in 1978.
