= Fritz Mannheimer =

German-Dutch banker and art collector (1890–1939)

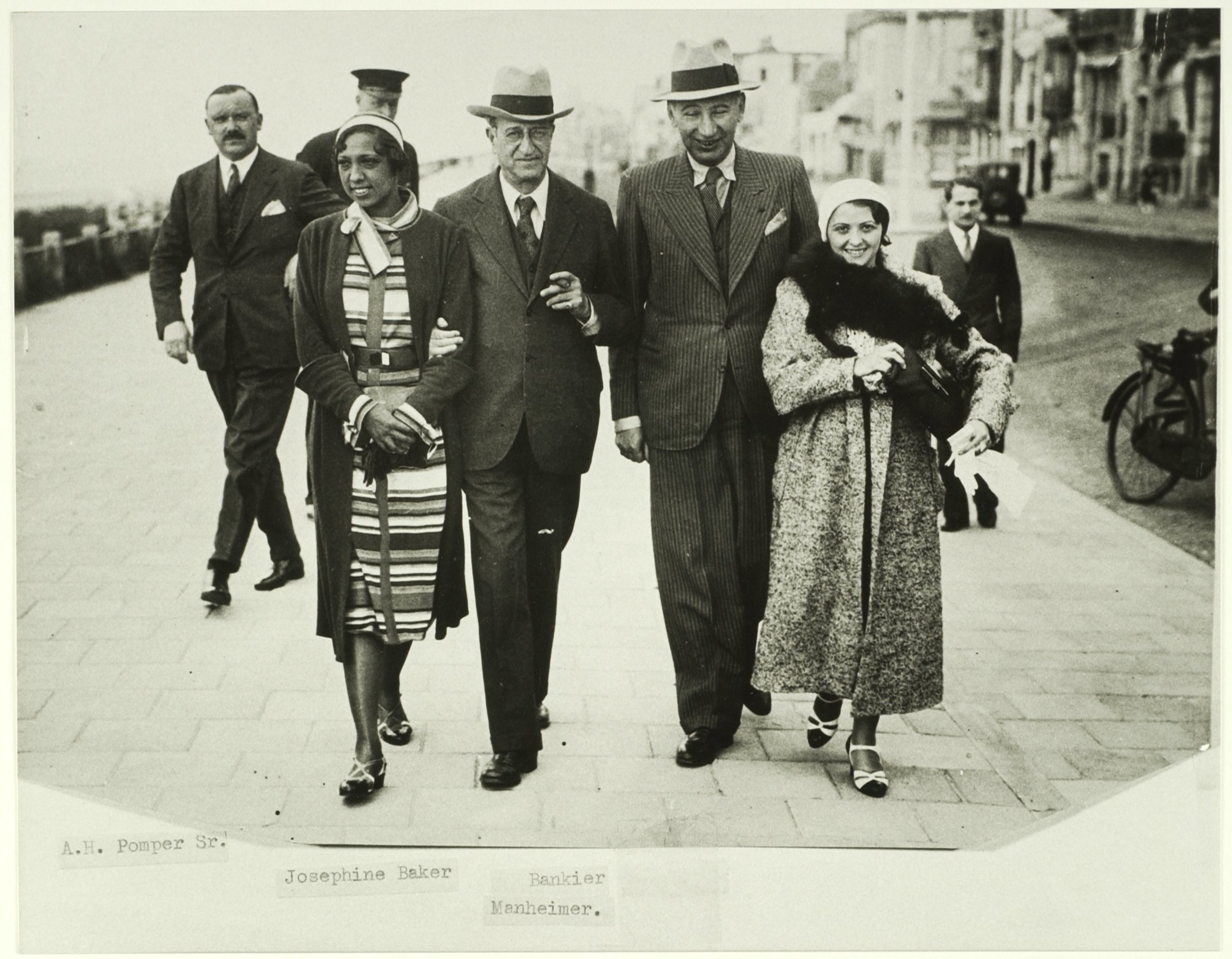
- Mannheimer (with cigar) and Josephine Baker in 1932
- Born: Fritz Mannheimer; 19 September 1890; Stuttgart, Württemberg
- Died: 9 August 1939 (aged 48); Vaucresson, France
- Citizenship: Dutch
- Education: University of Heidelberg
- Occupation: Financier
- Employer: Mendelssohn & Co.
- Spouse: Marie Jane Reiss (m. 1939)
- Children: Anne-France Mannheimer (b. 1939)

Fritz Mannheimer (19 September 1890 – 9 August 1939) was a German-born and, from 1936, Dutch banker and art collector who was the director of the Amsterdam branch of the Berlin-based investment bank Mendelssohn & Co. that was for some time the main supporter of the Dutch capital market. Known as the "King of Flying Capital", he was one of the main organisers of credit for post-war Germany. His international financial work brought him recognition, such as being awarded Grand Officer of the Légion d'honneur. His collection was bought by Hitler in 1941, but it was returned to the Netherlands after the war.

== Birth and youth ==
Born into a Jewish family in Stuttgart, Württemberg, he was a son of Max Mannheimer, a wine merchant, and his wife, Lili Sara Fränkel. He attended the University of Heidelberg where he obtained a Doctor of Law and became a Dutch citizen in 1936.

== Career and lifestyle ==
According to an obituary of the banker published in the 21 August 1939 edition of Time:

During the War, barely out of college, he got a job in the German Government bureau directing the flow of raw materials through Germany. In no time, he headed it. At 27 he persuaded Belgian industrialists to accept the paper currency issued in occupied territory. After the War he managed Germany's central monetary office, where his first job was to organize the Amsterdam branch of the famous, 125-year-old Mendelssohn & Co. Bank." The article continued, "Mysterious (few people even knew his name), powerful, grasping, he began to formulate the financial policies of nations and to get fat. At one time he worked simultaneously for the German, Austrian, Czech, Polish, Hungarian, Yugoslav and Romanian Central Banks. Twice he turned down the presidency of the German Reichsbank, the second time proposing Hjalmar Schacht in his place. Schacht got the job. He began to buy antiques, among them the valuable Eucharistic Dove stolen from Salzburg's Cathedral. He was too skeptical to have any truck with Ivar Kreuger or any private financier. His was the last Jewish-owned bank allowed to do business in Germany.

In fact, Mendelssohn & Co. Amsterdam was independent of the Berlin Mendelssohn bank. As such it helped the German industrialist Robert Bosch to establish an American firm, thus circumventing the rules against German capital in the U.S.A.

The Time profile, while acknowledging Mannheimer's power and position, was also remarkably negative, describing him as "fat-lipped, mean, noxious, cigar-chomping" man who gave one of his mistresses a gold bathtub and who, "after 20 years in The Netherlands, could not speak enough Dutch to boss his chauffeur." Another source recalled that while most Amsterdam bankers were discreet enough to use taxis for daily transportation, the flamboyant Mannheimer traveled by a Rolls-Royce limousine. He also raised eyebrows by maintaining two lavish homes: a 1913 redbrick mansion at Hobbemastraat 20 in Amsterdam, which was derogatorily nicknamed "Villa Protski", and Villa Monte Cristo near Vaucresson, France. His offices were located in a palatial 17th-century mansion in Amsterdam, at Herengracht 412.

== Marriage and child ==
At his home in Vaucresson, on 1 June 1939, Mannheimer married Marie Jane Reiss (1917–2004). Born in China, she was one of three daughters born to Hugo Reiss, a prominent German Jewish businessman in Shanghai who served as Brazil's consul in that city, and his American-born Irish Catholic wife, Marie Ignatius Murphy. According to the Time profile, Mannheimer, who had long been obese and in ill health, suffered a heart attack during the wedding and had to be revived with two injections. The best man was Paul Reynaud, the French minister of finance and later French prime minister; the banker also was a close friend of prime minister Édouard Daladier.

The couple had one child, Anne France Mannheimer, later known as Anne France Engelhard. She was born on 24 December 1939, six months after her parents' marriage and four months after her father's death. (Commonly called Annette, she later became the second wife of the Dominican-American fashion designer Oscar de la Renta.)

== Death ==
On 9 August 1939, two months after his wedding, Mannheimer reportedly was in his Amsterdam office when he received a phone call from an unidentified party, left the office, boarded a train for France, and joined his wife at their house, where he died the same day. Contemporary observers quickly speculated on the manner of death, with many newspapers suggesting suicide; but Mannheimer's health had always been precarious, due, in part, to his excessive weight. In addition to the heart attack suffered on his wedding day, he reportedly nearly died after suffering another, while travelling in Egypt, in 1937. Shortly before his death, Mannheimer, who stood 172 centimetres (5 ft 8 in) tall, was described as being "half his normal weight" of 90 kg (200 lb).

Whatever the actual cause of death, The New York Times was just one of many leading world newspapers which reported that Mannheimer's demise took place under "circumstances attended by a measure of mystery." The day after his death, Mendelssohn & Co. in Amsterdam announced that it was insolvent and that Mannheimer's collections, which were valued at more than 13 million guilders (approximately $100,000,000 today), had been largely funded on unlimited bank credit. Housed at his homes in the Netherlands and France, Mannheimer's art (which included works by Chardin, Fragonard, Watteau, and Rubens, at least one fake Vermeer, gold reliquary busts, tapestries, Meissen porcelain, and Judaica including a naturalistic circa-1800 Hanukkah lamp known as the "Oak Tree Menorah"), and his collection of 18th-century furniture (much of it acquired for him by the American decorator Elsie de Wolfe and the Paris decorator Stéphane Boudin) were seized by the bank. Soon afterwards, the Amsterdam branch of Mendelssohn & Co. suspended its activities.

== Demise of bank, dispersal of art collection ==
The entire Mendelssohn firm was forcibly liquidated by the Nazis later that same year—its assets were transferred to Deutsche Bank—and much of Mannheimer's art was purchased by Adolf Hitler in 1941, after the German invasion of the Netherlands. Other works from the collections were stored in England and Vichy, France, by Mannheimer's widow until the end of the war.

The lion's share of Mannheimer's collection was acquired by the Rijksmuseum in 1952, when it was repatriated from Germany; the museum was forced to sell half of the collection by the order of the Dutch Ministry of Finance. Coincidentally, Mannheimer's Amsterdam residence now is used for some of the Rijksmuseum's offices. The Metropolitan Museum of Art owns one of the masterpieces of Mannheimer's collection, "Young Man Blowing Bubbles" (a.k.a. "Soap Bubbles"), a circa-1734 painting by Jean-Baptiste-Siméon Chardin; it was sold in 1949 to the museum by Wildenstein & Co., the art dealers, who had acquired the painting after it was repatriated to France in 1946.
