= Wireless Medical Telemetry Service =

Wireless specification for transmission of health data

Wireless Medical Telemetry Service (WMTS) is a wireless service specifically defined in the United States by the Federal Communications Commission (FCC) for transmission of data related to a patient's health (biotelemetry). It was created in 2000 because of interference issues due to establishment of digital television. The bands defined are 608-614 MHz, 1395-1400 MHz and 1427-1432 MHz. Devices using these bands are typically proprietary. Further, the use of these bands has not been internationally agreed to, so many times devices cannot be marketed or used freely in countries other than the United States.

Because of this, in addition to WMTS, many manufacturers have created devices that transmit data in the ISM bands such as 902-928 MHz, and, more typically, 2.4-2.5 GHz, often using IEEE 802.11 or Bluetooth radios.

== FCC statements ==
There is an FCC statement on coexistence of WMTS in various frequency bands.

Prior to the establishment of the WMTS, medical telemetry devices generally could be operated on an unlicensed basis on vacant television channels 7-13 (174-216 MHz) and 14-46 (470-668 MHz) or on a licensed but secondary basis to private land mobile radio operations in the 450-470 MHz frequency band. This meant that wireless medical telemetry operations had to accept interference from the primary users of these frequency bands, i.e., the television broadcasters and private land mobile radio licensees. Further, if a wireless medical telemetry operation caused interference to television or private land mobile radio transmissions, the user of the wireless medical telemetry equipment would be responsible for rectifying the problem, even if that meant shutting down the medical telemetry operation.

The FCC was concerned that certain regulatory developments, including the advent of digital television (DTV) service, would result in more intensive use of these frequencies by the primary services, subjecting wireless medical telemetry operations to greater interference than before and perhaps precluding such operations entirely in many instances. To ensure that wireless medical telemetry devices can operate free of harmful interference, the FCC decided to establish the WMTS. In a Report and Order released on June 12, 2000, the FCC allocated a total of 14 megahertz of spectrum to WMTS on a primary basis. At the same time, it adopted a number of regulations to ensure that the WMTS frequencies are used effectively and efficiently for their intended medical purpose. The WMTS rules took effect on October 16, 2000

== WMTS rules by FCC ==
Band Plan:

The frequencies currently allocated for WMTS are divided into three blocks: the 608-614 MHz frequency band (which corresponds to UHF TV channel 37 but is not used by any TV station because it is used for radio astronomy) and the 1395-1400 MHz and 1427-1432 MHz frequency bands (both of which had been used by the Federal Government but were reallocated to the private sector under the Omnibus Budget Reconciliation Act of 1993). The frequencies in the 1427-1432 MHz band are shared by WMTS with non-medical telemetry operations, such as utility telemetry operations, that are regulated under Part 90 of the FCC's Rules. Generally, WMTS operations are accorded primary status over non-medical telemetry operations in the 1427-1429.5 MHz band, but are treated as secondary to non-medical telemetry operations in the 1429.5-1432 MHz band. However, there are seven geographical areas in which WMTS and non-medical telemetry operations have "flipped" the bands in which each enjoys primary status. These seven areas, termed the "carve-out" areas, are (1) Pittsburgh, PA; (2) the Washington, D.C. metropolitan area; (3) Richmond/Norfolk, VA; (4) Austin/Georgetown, TX; (5) Battle Creek, MI; (6) Detroit, MI; and (7) Spokane, WA. In these seven areas, in contrast to the rest of the country, WMTS has primary status in the 1429-1431.5 MHz band, but is secondary to non-medical telemetry operations in the 1427-1429 MHz band.

== FDA comments ==
Comments from US FDA, in part:

Because of concerns for interference with the present wireless medical telemetry systems, and the introduction of the WMTS, CDRH has issued a public health advisory to hospital administrators, risk managers, directors of biomedical/clinical engineering, and nursing home directors. In general, CDRH encourages manufacturers and users of medical telemetry devices to move to the new spectrum because of its protections against interference from other intentional transmitters and because frequency coordination will be provided.

== See also ==
- Medical Device Radiocommunications Service
