= Oscar Philipp =

German-born metal trader who co-founded Philipp Brothers

- Born: Oscar Israel Philipp; 1882; Wandsbek, Germany
- Died: circa August 31, 1965 (age 77); Geneva, Switzerland
- Citizenship: German; English
- Occupation: Metal trader
- Known for: Co-founder of Philipp Brothers
- Spouse: Clarisse Weil
- Children: Elliot Philipp; Anthony Bertram Philipp
- Family: Julius Philipp (brother); Martha Bernays (cousin)

Oscar Israel Philipp (1882–1965) was a German-born metal trader who co-founded Philipp Brothers.

== Biography ==
Oscar Philipp was born to an Orthodox Jewish family in Wandsbek, Germany. He was a cousin to Martha Bernays, the wife of Sigmund Freud. In 1901, his brother, Julius Philipp, founded a small metal trading company in Hamburg, where Oscar worked.

In 1909, Oscar Philipp moved to London and established a metal trading company under the name of "Philipp Brothers". Julius continued to run the German operation out of Hamburg. In 1914, with the advent of World War I, Siegfried Bendheim, an apprentice, German citizen, and minor partner in Philipp Brothers, avoided internment by the British government by moving to New York City where he established Philipp Brothers, Inc. Oscar was not affected by the war as he had previously obtained British citizenship. In 1923, another apprentice and second cousin to Bendheim, Siegfried Ullmann, moved to the New York office. In 1934, Julius moved Philipp Brothers' German operations to Amsterdam due to the rise of Nazi Germany and died in the Bergen-Belsen concentration camp in 1944. Philipp handled all contacts with the European market. The New York office eventually became Philipp Brothers headquarters. By the 1950s, Philipp Brothers had become the largest metal trader in the world.

== Philanthropy ==
Philipp, a Hebrew scholar, was active in Jewish and Zionist causes. He served as a chairman of the Bachad fellowship, on the executive committee and council of British ORT, as a joint treasurer of Jews' College, as the treasurer of the London Board of Jewish Religious Education, and the founder of the Hebrew Publishing House. He was one of the founders of the Technion University in Haifa and Kibbutz Lavi.

== Personal life ==
Phillip was married to Clarisse Weil; they had two sons, obstetrician Elliot Elias Philipp and Anthony Bertram Philipp. He died in Geneva, Switzerland.
