= Engelhard =

Defunct American corporation

- Industry: Metals
- Founded: 1902 in Newark
- Founder: Charles W. Engelhard
- Defunct: May 30, 2006 (purchased)
- Fate: Acquired for $5 billion by BASF
- Headquarters: Iselin, New Jersey, United States of America

An Engelhard silver bar

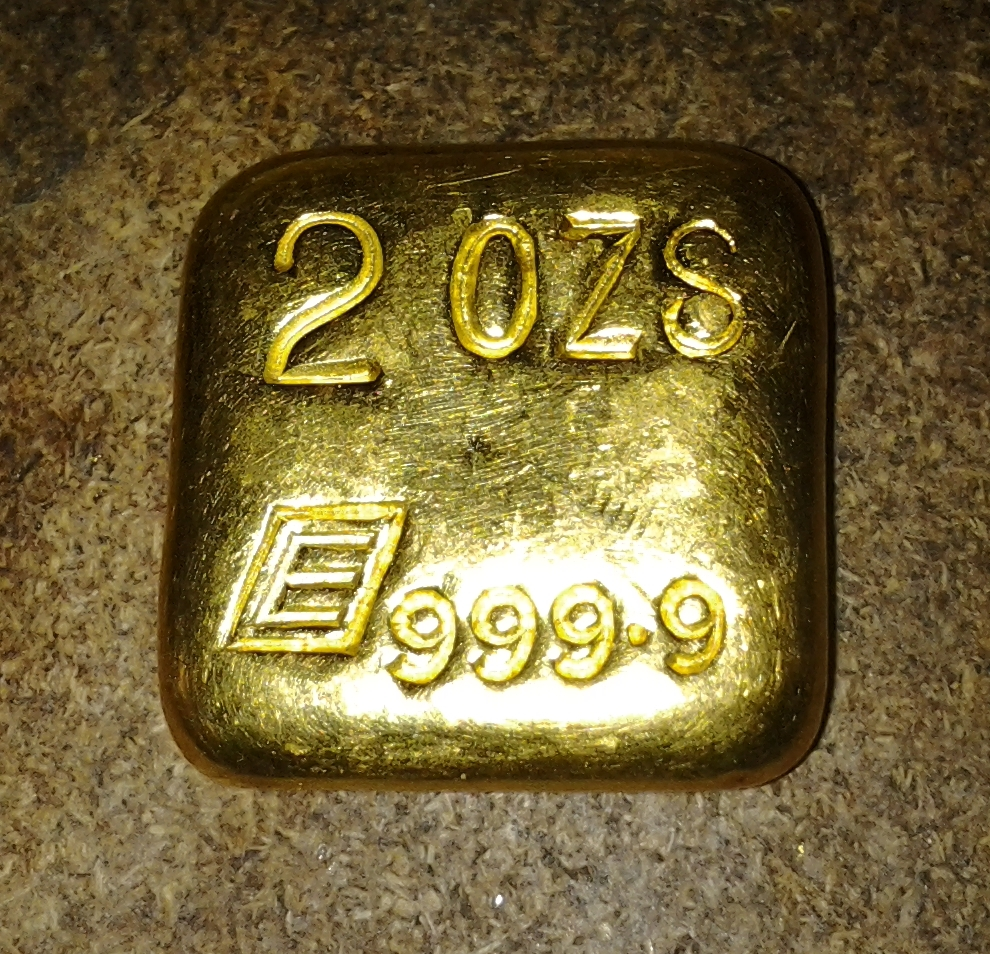
An Engelhard poured 2 oz 99.99% pure gold bar

Engelhard Corporation was an American Fortune 500 company headquartered in Iselin, New Jersey, United States. It is credited with developing the first production catalytic converter. In 2006, the German chemical manufacturer BASF bought Engelhard for US$5 billion.

== Early history ==
The company was started by Charles W. Engelhard Sr. in 1902 when he purchased the Charles F. Croselmire Company in Newark, New Jersey with the proceeds from his wife's dowry. His wife Emilie Maria was the daughter of German brandy distiller Friedrich Canthal de He subsequently founded the American Platinum Works in 1903 and acquired several other companies. In 1904, he purchased Baker & Co., a platinum smelting and refining business located in Newark and in 1905, he established Hanovia Chemical and Manufacturing Company also in Newark. Engelhard became the world's largest refiner and fabricator of platinum, gold and silver, a producer of silver and silver alloys in mill forms, operator of the world's largest precious metals smelter. They also developed liquid gold for decorative applications.

== Merger and spinoff of Phibro ==
In 1958, Engelhard's son Charles Jr. consolidated the family's holdings to form Engelhard Industries, Inc. as a publicly held company listed on the New York Stock Exchange. In 1963, Engelhard, under the advisement of Lazard Frères, took a 20 percent interest in Minerals & Chemicals Philipp (MCP), a recently formed partnership between a small producer of nonmetallic minerals such as kaolin and fuller's earth, and Philipp Brothers, a trading firm specializing in the buying and selling of ores on the international market. Engelhard executed the transaction through a stock swap, giving up 8 percent of Engelhard as partial payment for the 20 percent interest in MCP.

Sales in MCP took off soon afterwards, mostly from Philipp Brothers' fast-growing ore trading. In 1964 it had sales of $US447 million, and by 1966 sales reached $US709 million. Even though Engelhard Industries did only about 40 percent of that figure, it was able, in September 1967, to work out a merger of the two companies that left the Engelhard family controlling about 40 percent of the new company. The new entity, which was called Engelhard Minerals & Chemicals Corporation (EMCC), was structured into three divisions: Minerals & Chemicals, which processed non-metallic minerals; Engelhard Industries, which refined and fabricated precious metals; and Philipp Brothers. Nearly one-half of the company's 1967 net income of $28 million was generated by the Philipp trading division, with the Engelhard metal processing contributing 34 percent and minerals and chemicals about 19 percent.

In the early 1960s, Engelhard developed a series of premium paint finishes for General Motors, marketed as Firemist paints using discs of calcium, sodium and borosilicate to produce truer colours, more intense shine, and better transparency and reflection than traditional metallics. The borosilicate was engineered to deliver more chroma, color purity, brightness, transparency and reflectivity. The finishes actually contained no aluminium or other metal particles and were thus not technically “metallic,” though often described as such. — though the manufacturing process of electro-depositing aluminized polyester flakes was expensive. Firemist would later be used for finishes on its guitars by the Fender corporation.

Philipp's trading continued to enjoy phenomenal growth as the world turned to spot traders to move scarce natural resources around the globe. By 1972, EMCC's sales hit $US2 billion, about 80 percent of it supplied by Philipp, and in 1974 revenue reached $5 billion. By 1981, Philipp Brothers earned 89 percent of the total corporation's $US26.6 billion in revenues and 88 percent of its $US532.7 million in profits. Management in the slow growing minerals-and-chemicals division, along with those in precious metals, felt overshadowed by their trading counterparts. This led to the spinoff of Philipp Brothers (later called Phibro), and renaming what was left the Engelhard Corporation.

== Later history ==
Engelhard operated a Minerals & Chemicals Division and an Engelhard Industries Division with corporate headquarters in Menlo Park, New Jersey. In 1984, the company was realigned to consist of a Specialty Chemicals Division and a Specialty Metals Division. Engelhard expanded significantly through growth, acquisitions and joint ventures. Acquisitions included the Freeport Kaolin Company in 1985; most of the business of the Harshaw/Filtrol Partnership in 1988; the auto catalysts and petroleum catalysts businesses of Solvay Catalysts GmbH, in 1992 and 1994, respectively; the Mearl Corporation in 1996; the catalyst business of Mallinckrodt Inc. in 1998; Süd Chemie's fats and oils catalyst business in 2001; and the Collaborative Group, a personal care company, in 2004. In November 1994 Engelhard formed a joint venture with the French precious metals group Le Comptoir Lyon, Alemand, Louyot(CLAL) forming Engelhard CLAL, supplying Industrial Precious Metals to the European market.

On May 30, 2006, Engelhard was taken over by BASF after the board agreed for the takeover of BASF. BASF paid $US39 per share. The transaction totaled $5 billion. On August 1, 2006, BASF began to rename Engelhard worldwide. This started in the US with BASF Catalysts LLC. On April 1, 2010, BASF Catalysts LLC became part of BASF Corporation.

== Environmental record ==
Catalytic-converter-equipped vehicles have helped cut other air pollutants by more than 3 billion tons worldwide between 1975 and 2000; of this 1.5 billion short tons was in the United States. Automobiles meet emission standards that required reductions of up to 98+ percent for HC, 96 percent for CO, and 95 percent for NOx compared to the uncontrolled levels of automobiles sold in the 1960s. Despite the fact that fuel use increased approximately 50 percent and vehicle miles traveled nationwide increased by 150 percent between 1970 and 1998, CO, VOC, and NOx emissions from motor vehicles in 1998 decreased by over 44 million short tons compared to 1970 levels.

Engelhard received a 2004 Presidential Green Chemistry Challenge Award from the U.S. Environmental Protection Agency for "the design of safer chemicals", specifically the company's Rightfit organic pigments.

Researchers at the University of Massachusetts Amherst ranked Engelhard as the 32nd-largest corporate producer of air pollution in the United States, just behind Danaher (a professional instrumentation, industrial technologies and tools & components company). The study found Engelhard's most toxic pollution comprised cobalt (500 lb/year), nickel (2069 lb/year), chromium (1000 lb/year), and manganese (500 lb/year) compounds, based on Toxics Release Inventory data.
