= Philipp Depiereux =

German entrepreneur and author (born 1977)

- Depiereux in 2026
- Born: July 12, 1977 (age 49); Düren, Germany
- Occupations: Entrepreneur, author, columnist
- Known for: Co-founder of etventure; Changerider
- Website: depiereux.de

Philipp Depiereux (born 12 July 1977) is a German entrepreneur and author. He co-founded the digital consultancy etventure, which was acquired by EY in 2017.

== Early life and education ==
Depiereux was born in Düren, Germany. Depiereux completed his Abitur at Burgau-Gymnasium in Düren in 1996 and then studied business administration at the International School of Management.

== Career ==
In 2004, Depiereux joined the management of Alesco (formerly Schoeller Aldo), a company that produces plastic films, alongside his father, Gunter Depiereux. He served as CEO until 2010.

In 2010, together with Philipp Herrmann and Christian Lüdtke, he founded the company etventure, a consultancy for business development. In addition to providing digitalisation services for businesses, Depiereux, through etventure, also published studies on digital transformation in Germany in collaboration with the research institute GfK. In a 2018 article in Handelsblatt, journalist Katrin Terpitz described Depiereux as a "messiah of digitalisation in Germany's Mittelstand" (Messias der Digitalisierung im deutschen Mittelstand). The company was acquired by EY (formerly Ernst & Young) in 2017. Depiereux remained CEO until his departure in 2021.

In 2018, Depiereux launched Changerider, a project featuring interviews with business, politics, and research professionals on topics related to digital transformation. These interviews are presented as videos, podcasts, and articles and were covered by German magazine t3n. After leaving etventure, Depiereux co-founded the consultancy Scaled Innovation Group.

In addition to his business activities, Depiereux is also an author and journalist, having published his own articles in magazines such as changement! and Capital. In February 2025, Depiereux began writing a column for the German business newspaper Handelsblatt about life and politics in the United States. His final column in the series appeared in December 2025.

In 2026, Depiereux and Friedrich Arnold published Mut zur KI, a book about the adoption of artificial intelligence by German mid-sized companies.

== Views on digital media use by children ==
Depiereux has advocated age restrictions on children's access to smartphones and social media. In interviews, he described household rules under which his children received smartphones no earlier than the age of 14 and were not permitted to use social media before the age of 18. He has supported statutory age limits for social media while arguing that restrictions should be combined with media literacy.

== Personal life ==
Depiereux is married and has four children. The family moved to Newport Beach, California, in 2022.

== Publications ==
- ChangeRider: Pioniergeister statt Bedenkenträger: Wie mutige Macher aus Politik, Wirtschaft und Gesellschaft unsere Zukunft gestalten (2019). Murmann Publishers. ISBN 9783750247987
- Werdet WELTMUTFÜHRER (2020). Great2Know Publishing. ISBN 9783753116945
- With Friedrich Arnold: Mut zur KI: Wie wir mit neuem Mindset Unternehmen erfolgreich in die Dekade der KI führen. GABAL, 2026. ISBN 978-3-96739-273-9
- With the assistance of Alexander Bayer: Offline: Warum ich als Digitalunternehmer meine Kinder analog erziehe. Kiepenheuer & Witsch, forthcoming 2027. ISBN 978-3-462-06114-7
