= Phibro =

International physical commodities trading firm

Phibro LLC
- Company type: Private (LLC)
- Industry: Commodities trading
- Founded: 1901
- Founder: Julius Philipp; Oscar Philipp
- Headquarters: Stamford, Connecticut
- Key people: Simon Greenshields
- Parent: Energy Arbitrage Partners
- Website: www.phibro.com

Phibro is an international physical commodities trading firm. Phibro trades in crude oil, oil products, natural gas, precious and base metals, agricultural products, commodity-related equities, and other products. Phibro became the largest metal trading company in the world. Phibro's headquarters are located in Stamford, Connecticut.

== History ==
The origin of the company traces to 1901 when Julius Philipp, an Orthodox Jew, founded a small metal trading company in Hamburg, Germany and then in 1909, Philipp's younger brother, Oscar Philipp established a metal trading company in London under the name of Philipp Brothers. Julius continued to run the German operation out of Hamburg. In 1914, with the advent of World War I, Siegfried Bendheim, an apprentice, German citizen, and minor partner, avoided internment by the British government by moving to New York City where he established Philipp Brothers, Inc. while Oscar Philipp continued to operate the London office as he had previously obtained British citizenship. In 1923, another apprentice and second cousin to Bendheim, Siegfried Ullmann, moved to the New York office where he and Bendheim served as general partners with a minority interest held by London. Responsibilities in New York were divided with Bendheim responsible for chemicals and Ullmann for metals, scrap, and ore including their mining operations in Bolivia. In 1934, Julius moved Philipp Brothers' German operations to Amsterdam due to the rise of Nazi Germany (Julius perished in 1944 in the Bergen-Belsen concentration camp). The New York office eventually became Philipp Brothers headquarters.

In 1926, Ullmann traveled to South America to stake out possible sources of metals and found Bolivia to be the one country with the most potential; and Phillip Brothers summarily opened offices in the tin-mining centers of Potosi and Oruro. The venture did not pay immediate benefits as the tin industry was dominated by the three "tin barons": Moritz Hochschild, Simón Iturri Patiño, and Carlos Víctor Aramayo; and Philipp Brothers was a distant fourth in production in the country operating a single small mine. They did however, develop a special relationship with Corporación Minera de Bolivia (COMIBOL), the state-owned national mining company of Bolivia, as its primary financier and selling agent. By 1936, Philipp Brothers was responsible for 4.5% of all Bolivian tin exports.

In 1952, at the urging of Philipp Brothers and riding a wave of nationalizations of mining assets in South America, the Bolivian government nationalized all mining assets in the country (tin at the time was 80% of Bolivia's exports and 40% of GDP). Despite having its Bolivian mine taken over, Philipp Brothers, thanks to its exclusive relationship with COMIBOL, became the largest tin merchant in the world. Experience earned in Bolivia - maneuvering through the various changes in government and dealing with a succession of administrative officials - allowed Philipp Brothers to develop a model for operating in high political risk environments which it applied globally. During World War II, nearly all Bolivian tin was sent to the US - which did not have any domestic sources - for the war effort. In the 1950s, after US demand for tin declined, Philipp Brothers arranged barter transactions whereby the US government would trade excess agricultural products for tin supplies that they had little immediate need for but would continue to stockpile while Bolivia would benefit by keeping its mines operating and simultaneously obtain a negotiable commodity. Using experience garnered in Bolivia via barter transactions, secured lending, and exclusive marketing contracts, Philipp Brothers became the largest metals merchant in the world in the 1960s.

Philipp Brothers acquired a 90% ownership of Compañía Minera Santa Fe that mined iron in Chile following the death of its leader Andrés Andai in 1960. Depletion of Compañia Minera Santa Fe's mines and low international ore prices generated a crisis in the company, and it was then sold to Emérico Letay's Compañía Minera Santa Bárbara.

In 1967, it was acquired and became the Philipp Brothers Division of Engelhard Minerals & Chemicals Corporation. In 1981 the company was spun off as Phibro Corporation, and that same year the company subsequently acquired Salomon Brothers, creating Phibro-Salomon Inc.

In 1983, Michael Farmer, Baron Farmer joined Anglo Chemical, which was part of Phibro-Salomon, as head of global base metal trading until 1989. Phibro Energy, Inc. was established in 1984, absorbing the oil department of Philipp Brothers. In 1986, the combined company removed the Phibro name from the parent company. In 1993, Phibro Energy, Inc. became the Phibro Energy Division of Salomon Inc. It was renamed simply "Phibro" in 1996, and in 1997, Salomon was acquired by Travelers Group, which merged with Citicorp to form Citigroup in 1998. With the merger, Salomon became an indirect, wholly owned subsidiary of Citigroup.

Phibro came to the notice of the public when its leader, Andrew J. Hall reportedly was seeking a $100 million bonus from Citigroup, which had been bailed out by U.S. taxpayers in 2009. Reportedly Phibro was the main source of the $2 billion in pretax revenue Citigroup received in commodities trading.

In October 2009, Occidental Petroleum announced it would acquire Phibro from Citigroup, estimating its net investment at approximately $250 million.

In January 2016, it was purchased by Energy Arbitrage Partners for an undisclosed sum.
