= Philip James Devereaux =

Cardiac Researcher

Philip James Deveraux
- Known for: Perioperative Care by evidence-based medicine
- Scientific career
- Fields: Medicine
- Institutions: McMaster University
- Doctoral advisor: Gordon Guyatt, Salim Yusuf

Philip James Devereaux is a Canadian cardiologist, clinical epidemiologist, and perioperative care physician. Devereaux conducts clinical research within cardiac and perioperative fields, with a focus on vascular surgical complications.

Devereaux is the current Chair of the Institute Advisory Board of Circulatory and Respiratory Health within the Canadian Institutes of Health Research, a full Professor and University Scholar in the Departments of Health Research Methods, Evidence, and Impact (HEI) and Medicine at McMaster University, the Canada Research Chair of Periopertive Medicine and the Endowed Research Salim Yusuf Chair in Cardiology within the Faculty of Health Sciences at McMaster University, Senior Scientist and the Scientific Leader of the Perioperative and Surgical Research Group at the Population Health Research Institute and President of the Society of Perioperative Research and Care.

== Education ==
Devereaux completed his MD in Medicine and PhD in Clinical Epidemiology at McMaster University, under the supervision of Gordon Guyatt and Salim Yusuf. He completed his Internal Medicine residency at the University of Calgary and his Cardiology residency at Dalhousie University.

== Contributions to health research ==
Devereaux is the author of more than 270 peer-reviewed publications, more than 50 book chapters or editorials, and over 900 abstracts and scholarly presentations. Since 2017, Deveraux has been annually listed in the Clarivate Analytics Highly Cited Researchers. According to Google Scholar Devereaux's work has been cited over 292,000 times, with Google scholar tabulation of the world's most cited scientists, listing him as 4102nd.

In 2014, Devereaux co-founded Canada's first Perioperative Cardiovascular Fellowship Program at McMaster University. Today, the fellowship is called the Perioperative Care Fellowship Program.

In 2017, Devereux helped organize the first international Perioperative Care Congress, an annual congress that promotes education and research in perioperative care, he continues to serve as a committee member. In 2019, he co-founded the international Society for Perioperative Research and Care (SPRC) and serves as its inaugural President. The SPRC is dedicated to improving care of patient undergoing surgery by bringing together physicians, health practitioners, and scientists to establish in models of care, conduct research, and promote evidence-based medicine.

In 2023, Deveraux was named head of the Accelerating Clinical Trials (ACT) consortium in Canada. He will lead the ACT consortium in its aim to share knowledge and improve medical research capacity and randomized controlled clinical trial (RCTs) across the country. The consortium support an estimated 230 researchers.

== Notable awards and honours ==
Devereaux is a Fellow of the Canadian Academy of Health Sciences.

In 2011, his research was recognized as one of six top achievements in Canadian health research by the Canadian Institutes of Health Research (CIHR) and the Canadian Medical Association Journal (CMAJ) Top Achievements in Health Research National Award;

In 2017, he was granted a Tier I Canada Research Chair in Cardiology by the Canadian Institutes of Health Research.

In 2018, he the recipient of the American Society of Anesthesiology Honorary Member Award and the Merit Award for Contributions to Medical Education by the Canadian Association for Medical Education.

In 2019, he was he recipient of the MacOrtho Award of Excellence, and Distinction for Best Practice for UNIVANTS of Healthcare Excellence Award.

In 2020, he was elected a Fellow of the Royal Society of Canada. The same year, Devereaux was the inaugural recipient of the David Sackett Mentorship & Supervision Award in the Full Time & Joint category.

In 2021, he was the recipient of the Canadian Institutes of Health Research Institute of Circulatory and Respiratory Health (CIHR-ICRH) and the Canadian Cardiovascular Society (CCS) Distinguished Lecturer Award in Cardiovascular Sciences.
