= List of communities in Nova Scotia =

This is a list of communities in the Canadian province of Nova Scotia. For the purposes of this list, a community is defined as an unincorporated settlement inside or outside a municipality.

== A ==
- Abbots Dyke
- Abercrombie
- Acaciaville
- Admiral Rock
- Advocate Harbour
- Africville
- Afton
- Alder River
- Aldershot
- Alma
- Anderson Mountain
- Ardness
- Argyle (Guysborough)
- Argyle (Yarmouth)
- Argyle Sound
- Arichat
- Arisaig
- Arlington
- Aspen
- Atlanta
- Atlantic
- Atwoods Brook
- Aylesford
- Auburn
- Aulds Cove

== B ==
- Baccaro
- Bald Rock
- Bangor
- Bang's Falls
- Barrachois (Cape Breton)
- Barrachois (Colchester)
- Barrington
- Barrington Passage
- Barrington West
- Barr Settlement
- Bass River
- Baxters Harbour
- Bayport
- Bayside
- Bay St. Lawrence
- Bear Cove (Digby)
- Bear Cove (Halifax)
- Bear Point
- Bear River
- Beaver Dam
- Bedford
- Belnan
- Benacadie
- Ben Eoin
- Beinn Bhreagh
- Beinn Scalpie
- Big Beach
- Big Pond
- Big Pond Centre
- Billtown
- Birchtown
- Black Rock, Colchester County
- Black Rock, Cumberland County
- Black Rock, Kings County
- Black Rock, Victoria County
- Blanche
- Blomidon
- Borneo
- Bramber
- Brass Hill
- Brighton
- Brookfield
- Brooklyn (Hants)
- Brooklyn (Queens)
- Brook Village
- Bucklaw
- Burntcoat

== C ==
- Caledonia
- Cambridge (Hants)
- Cambridge (Kings)
- Campbell
- Canaan (Kings)
- Canaan (Lunenburg)
- Canaan (Yarmouth)
- Canso
- Cape North
- Capstick
- Cannes
- Carleton Village
- Castle Bay
- Central Woods Harbour
- Centre Burlington
- Centre Rawdon
- Centreville (Shelburne)
- Charlesville
- Chéticamp
- Chéverie
- Cherry Brook
- Chipmans Corner
- Chester
- Christmas Island
- Church Point
- Churchover
- Clam Point
- Clarksville
- Clementsport
- Cleveland
- Clementsvale
- Clyde River
- Cole Harbour
- Coldbrook
- Coffinscroft
- Collingwood
- Conquerall Bank
- Conquerall Mills
- Conway
- Cook's Cove
- Cornwallis Park
- Country Harbour
- Creignish

== D ==
- Dartmouth
- Debert
- Deep Brook
- Digby
- Dingwall
- Doctors Cove
- Dominion
- Donkin
- Duncan's Cove

== E ==
- East Baccaro
- East Bay
- East Berlin
- East Gore
- East LaHave
- East Noel
- East Pennant
- East Preston
- East Side Port l'Hébert
- East Uniacke
- Economy
- Ecum Secum
- Eel Bay
- Ellershouse
- Elmsdale
- Elmsvale
- Enfield

== F ==
- Fairview
- Falmouth
- Fall River
- Fauxburg
- Five Mile River
- Five Islands
- Florence
- Forbes Point
- Forest Glen
- Frenchvale

== G ==
- Gavelton
- Gardners Mills
- Georgefield
- Glace Bay
- Glen Haven
- Goose Lake
- Gore
- Gormanville
- Goshen
- Grand Desert
- Grand Étang
- Grand Pré
- Granville Ferry
- Great Village
- Greenfield
- Greenville
- Greenwood (Shelburne)
- Greenwood
- Grosses Coques
- Guinea
- Gunning Cove
- Guysborough

== H ==
- Habitant
- Halibut Bay
- Halls Harbour
- Hammonds Plains
- Hardwood Lands
- Harrietsfield
- Harrigan Cove
- Harpellville
- Havre Boucher
- The Hawk
- Hebron
- Hebb's Cross
- Hectanooga
- Herring Cove
- Hilden
- Hillgrove
- Hillsvale
- Hopewell
- Hubbards

== I ==
- Indian Brook 14
- Indian Harbour Lake
- Indian Point
- Ingomar
- Ingonish
- Ingonish Beach
- Inverness
- Ireton
- Irishvale
- Island View

== J ==
- Joggins
- Jordantown
- Judique

== K ==
- Kempt
- Kempt Shore
- Kennetcook
- Kelleys Cove
- Ketch Harbour
- Kingsburg
- Kingsport

== L ==
- Lantz
- L'Ardoise
- Lake Annis
- Lake Echo
- Lake George (Yarmouth)
- Larry's River
- Latties Brook
- Lawrencetown (Halifax)
- Lime Hill
- Little Brook
- Little River Harbour
- Liverpool
- Lochaber Mines
- Londonderry
- Louisbourg
- Louisdale
- Lower Argyle
- Lower Burlington
- Lower Clarks Harbour
- Lower Clyde River
- Lower East Pubnico
- Lower Eel Brook
- Lower Sackville
- Lower Shag Harbour
- Lower Wedgeport
- Lower West Pubnico
- Lower Woods Harbour
- Lucasville
- Lyons Brook

== M ==
- Mabou
- Maccan
- MacPhees Corner
- Mader's Cove
- Marion Bridge
- Maitland
- Malay Falls
- Maple Grove
- Marinette
- Martinique
- Masstown
- Mayflower
- McNutts Island
- Meat Cove
- Medford
- Melbourne
- Melrose
- Meteghan
- Meteghan River
- Middle Cape
- Middle La Have
- Middle Musquodoboit
- Milford
- Middle West Pubnico
- Middle LaHave
- Milton
- Minasville
- Miramichi
- Moose Brook
- Moosehead
- Mooseland
- Moose River Gold Mines
- Mount Denson
- Mount Hanley
- Mount Uniacke
- Mushaboom
- Musquodoboit Harbour

== N ==
- Necum Teuch
- New Canada
- New Cumberland
- New Germany
- New Grafton
- New Ross
- New Waterford
- Newcombville
- Newellton
- Newport Corner
- Newport Station
- Nictaux
- Nine Mile River
- Nineveh (Lunenburg)
- Nineveh (Victoria)
- Noel
- Noel Road
- Noel Shore
- North Alton
- North Brookfield
- North East Harbour
- North East Point
- Northfield
- North Kemptville
- North Medford
- North Noel Road
- North Preston
- North River
- Northside East Bay
- North Sydney
- North West Harbour
- Norwood
- Nyanza

== O ==
- Oak Park
- Oakland
- Ohio
- Onslow
- Oregon
- Overton

== P ==
- Paradise
- Passchendaele
- Petite Rivière
- Pembroke
- Pembroke (Yarmouth)
- Pinehurst
- Pinkney's Point
- Pleasant Bay
- Pleasant River
- Pockwock
- Popes Harbour
- Port Bickerton
- Portage
- Portuguese Cove
- Porters Lake
- Port Clyde
- Port Hastings
- Port Hood
- Port La Tour
- Port Maitland
- Port Medway
- Port Morien
- Port Saxon
- Port Williams
- Priestville
- Pubnico

== Q ==
- Queensland
- Queensport
- Queensville

== R ==
- Raynardton
- Rawdon
- Rawdon Gold Mines
- Renfrew
- Reynoldscroft
- River Bourgeois
- Riverhead
- River John
- Riverport
- Riverside Corner
- Robert's Island
- Rockingham
- Rockville
- Rocky Bay
- Rose Bay
- Roseway
- Round Bay

== S ==
- Sambro
- Sambro Creek
- Sambro Head
- Sand Beach
- Sandford
- Sandy Cove (Digby)
- Sandy Cove (Halifax)
- Sandy Cove (Queens)
- Saulnierville
- Scotch Village
- Seal Island
- Selma
- Sheet Harbour
- Sheet Harbour 36
- Sheet Harbour Road
- Sherbrooke
- Sherose Island
- Shinimicas Bridge
- Shag Harbour
- Ship Harbour
- Short Beach
- Shubenacadie
- Smithsville
- Smithville
- Sonora
- South Belleville
- South Berwick
- South Canaan
- South Maitland
- South Rawdon
- South Side
- Springfield
- Springhaven
- Springhill
- Spryfield
- Spry Harbour
- Spry Bay
- St. Andrew's Channel
- Stanley
- St Croix
- Steam Mill
- Stewiacke
- Stoney Island
- Summerville
- Summerville (Yarmouth)
- Summerville Centre
- Sydney Mines
- Sydney
- Sydney Forks
- Sydney River

== T ==
- Tennycape
- Terra Nova
- Thomasville
- Thorburn
- Trafalgar
- Tremont
- Troy
- Tusket
- Tusket Falls
- Tusket Islands

== U ==
- Upper Burlington
- Upper Kennetcook
- Upper Musquodoboit
- Upper Nine Mile River
- Upper Port La Tour
- Upper Rawdon
- Upper Stewiacke
- Upper West Pubnico
- Upper Woods Harbour
- Urbania

== V ==
- Valley
- Victoria
- Villagedale

== W ==
- Walden
- Walton
- Waterloo
- Waterville
- Waverley
- Wedgeport
- West Arichat
- West Baccaro
- West Berlin
- West Branch River John
- West Chezzetcook, Nova Scotia
- West Gore
- West Pennant
- West Pubnico
- Western Shore
- Weston
- Weymouth
- Whitehill
- Whycocomagh
- Williamswood
- Wine Harbour
- Wolfville
- Woodstock
- Woodville (Kings)
- Woodville (Hants)

== Y ==
- Yankeetown

== See also ==
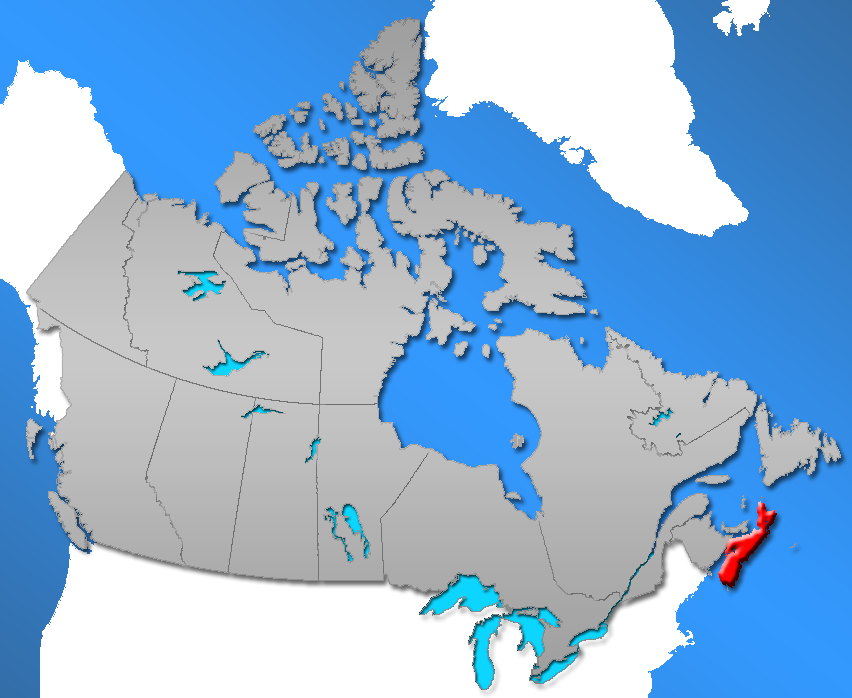
Communities in Canada's provinces and territories
- Demographics of Nova Scotia
- Geography of Nova Scotia
- List of counties of Nova Scotia
- List of municipalities in Nova Scotia
- List of towns in Nova Scotia
- List of villages in Nova Scotia
- List of Indian reserves in Nova Scotia
- List of ghost towns in Nova Scotia
