= List of communities in Region of Queens Municipality, Nova Scotia =

List of communities in Queens County, Nova Scotia

Communities are ordered by the highway on which they are located, whose routes start after each terminus near the largest community.

== Trunk routes ==
- Trunk 3: Brooklyn - Liverpool - White Point - Hunt's Point - Summerville Centre - Summerville Beach
- Trunk 8: Liverpool - Milton - Middlefield - Pleasantfield - South Brookfield - Caledonia - Harmony Mills - Kempt

== Collector roads ==
- Route 208: South Brookfield- North Brookfield- Brookfield Mines - Pleasant River
- Route 210: Greenfield - Buckfield
- Route 331: East Port Medway

== Rural roads ==
- Bang's Falls
- Beach Meadows
- Beech Hill
- Bristol
- Charleston
- East Berlin
- Eagle Head
- East Side Port l'Hébert
- Hibernia
- Labelle
- Low Landing
- Medway
- Mill Village
- Molega
- Mount Pleasant
- New Grafton
- Northfield
- Port Joli
- Port Medway
- Riversdale
- Sandy Cove
- South West Port Mouton
- Wellington
- West Berlin
- West Caledonia
- Western Head
- Westfield
- Whiteburn Mines
