= Sandy Cove =

Sandy Cove may refer to:

== Ireland ==
- Sandycove, a suburb of Dublin

== Canada ==
- Sandy Cove, Newfoundland and Labrador
- Sandy Cove, Elliston, Newfoundland and Labrador
- Savage Cove, incorporating Sandy Cove, Great Northern Peninsula, Newfoundland
- Sandy Cove beach, Lord's Cove, Newfoundland and Labrador
- Sandy Cove, Digby, Nova Scotia
- Sandy Cove, Halifax, Nova Scotia
- Sandy Cove, Queens, Nova Scotia
- Sandy Cove, Ontario
