= Bang's =

Bang's may refer to:

- Bang's bacillus, Brucella abortus, a bacterium that causes abortion in hoofed animals and undulant fever in humans
  - Brucellosis, also known as Bang's disease and undulant fever
- Bang's Falls, Nova Scotia, a community in Canada
- Bangs's Mountain Squirrel, a species of tree squirrel
- Go-Bang's, a Japanese girl band of the 1980s and 1990s
- Bang's theorem (disambiguation)

== See also ==
- Bang (disambiguation)
- Bang Bang (disambiguation)
