= Tarski's problem =

Alfred Tarski asked the following mathematical questions:

- For Tarski's problem about the elementary theory of free groups see free group.
- Tarski's circle-squaring problem
- Tarski's plank problem
- Tarski's exponential function problem
- Tarski monster group
- Tarski's high school algebra problem
