= List of shipwrecks in October 1843 =

The list of shipwrecks in October 1843 includes ships sunk, foundered, wrecked, grounded, or otherwise lost during October 1843.

== 1 October ==
List of shipwrecks: 1 October 1843
Ship	State	Description
Enchantress	United Kingdom	The ship struck rocks at South Shields, County Durham and sank. Her crew were rescued. She was on a voyage from Hull, Yorkshire to Newcastle upon Tyne, Northumberland. Enchantress was refloated on 7 October and beached. She was later taken in to South Shields.
Moira	United Kingdom	The ship departed from Chusan, China. No further trace, presumed foundered with the loss of all hands.
Paul and Emilie	France	The ship was in collision with Cecelia (United Kingdom) and sank off the coast of Portugal with the loss of four of her crew. She was on a voyage from St. Jago de Cuba, Cuba to Bordeaux, Gironde.
Virginia	United States	The brig foundered off the Berry Islands with the loss of all hands and all 60 passengers. She was on a voyage from Boston, Massachusetts to New Orleans, Louisiana.
Wave	United Kingdom	The ship was driven ashore at Kronstadt, Russia. She was on a voyage from Liverpool, Lancashire to Saint Petersburg, Russia. Wave was refloated on 3 October and taken in to Saint Petersburg.

== 2 October ==
List of shipwrecks: 2 October 1843
Ship	State	Description
Amalie	United Kingdom	The ship was wrecked of Scharhörn. Her crew were rescued. She was on a voyage from Peterhead, Aberdeenshire to Stettin.
Bolivar	United Kingdom	The barque was lost off the Cape Verde Islands. Her crew were rescued. She was on a voyage from Sierra Leone to London.
Felice	United Kingdom	The brig was destroyed by fire in the Gulf of Lyon. Her eleven crew were rescued by Leodes (France). Felice was on a voyage from Malta to Mauritius.
St. George	United Kingdom	The ship was driven ashore at Saunton Sands, Devon. Her crew were rescued. She was on a voyage from Saint Lucia to Liverpool, Lancashire. She was refloated on 4 October and taken into Bideford, Devon.
Urania	Duchy of Holstein	The ship was driven ashore near "Drelhagen". She was on a voyage from Flensburg to the West Indies.

== 3 October ==
List of shipwrecks: 3 October 1843
Ship	State	Description
Annette Henriette	France	The ship was driven ashore near Thisted, Denmark. Her crew were rescued. She was on a voyage from Havre de Grâce, Seine-Inférieure to Christiania, Norway.
Carib	(United Kingdom of Great Britain and Ireland) British North America	The ship capsized in the Atlantic Ocean (35°20′N 60°30′W). Her crew were rescued by Elizabeth Porter (United Kingdom). Carib was on a voyage from Halifax, Nova Scotia to Trinidad.
Catherina Maria	Prussia	The ship was driven ashore at Thisted. She was on a voyage from London, United Kingdom to Königsberg.
Christine Charlotte	Sweden	The ship was driven ashore on Læsø, Denmark. She was on a voyage from Hartlepool, County Durham, United Kingdom to Malmö.
Elizabeth and Mary	United Kingdom	The ship was driven ashore "on the Droogden". She was on a voyage from Hartlepool to a Baltic port. She was refloated and resumed her voyage.
Hero	United Kingdom	The ship ran aground off Rørvik, Denmark. She was refloated on 5 October and resumed her voyage.
Jane Coats	United Kingdom	The ship was wrecked off Toreko, Sweden. Her crew were rescued. She was on a voyage from Königsberg, Prussia to Hull, Yorkshire.
La Peyrouse	France	The ship ran aground on the Skagen Reef, off the coast of Denmark. She was on a voyage from Havre de Grâce to Saint Petersburg, Russia. She was refloated on 10 October and put in to Fredrikshavn, Denmark.
London	United Kingdom	The ship was driven ashore at Twielenfleth, Kingdom of Hanover.
Nederlands	Netherlands	The ship was driven ashore and wrecked at Thisted with the loss of her captain. She was on a voyage from London to Königsberg.
Shelmelere	United Kingdom	The ship was abandoned in the Atlantic Ocean. Her crew were rescued by Themis (United Kingdom). She was on a voyage from Wexford to St. John's, Newfoundland, British North America.

== 4 October ==
List of shipwrecks: 4 October 1843
Ship	State	Description
Fidelity	United Kingdom	The ship was driven ashore at Cape Magnusholm, Russia.
Matilda	United Kingdom	The ship was wrecked at "Lavenskar". Her crew were rescued.

== 5 October ==
List of shipwrecks: 5 October 1843
Ship	State	Description
Catherine	United Kingdom	The ship was lost off "Saddle Sand" with the loss of nine lives. She was on a voyage from Penang, Malaya to Malacca and Singapore.
Cornelia Jacoba	Flag unknown	The ship was wrecked on Wangerooge, Kingdom of Hanover. She was on a voyage from Jutland to Bordeaux, Gironde, France.
Frau Gesina	Kingdom of Hanover	The ship foundered off Juist.
Heron	United Kingdom	The ship struck a sunken wreck off the Gunfleet Sand and was damaged. She was on a voyage from London to South Shields, County Durham. She put into Great Yarmouth, Norfolk.

== 6 October ==
List of shipwrecks: 6 October 1843
Ship	State	Description
Ellida	Russia	The ship was driven ashore on the East coast of Gotland, Sweden. She had become a wreck by 20 October.
Furst Menschekoff	(Russian Empire) Grand Duchy of Finland	The ship was driven ashore on the north west coast of Gotland. She was on a voyage from Hull, Yorkshire to Turku.
Jane	United Kingdom	The sloop was in collision with the snow Virgil (United Kingdom) off Coquet Island, Northumberland and foundered.
Jelsker Antina	Netherlands	The ship departed from the Vlie for Grangemouth, Stirlingshire, United Kingdom. No further trace, presumed foundered with the loss of all hands.
Liverpool Packet	United Kingdom	The brig was abandoned in the Bristol Channel off Flat Holm. She subsequently drove ashore in Rhossili Bay and was wrecked. Liverpool Packet was on a voyage from Newport, Monmouthshire to Penzance, Cornwall.
Nordstjernen	Norway	The ship was driven ashore near Visby, Sweden. She was on a voyage from Bergen to Saint Petersburg, Russia. She had become a wreck by 18 October.
Yungai or Yungay	Chile	The ship was lost at "Huanchuce" or "Pinco".

== 7 October ==
List of shipwrecks: 7 October 1843
Ship	State	Description
Armide	France	The ship was driven ashore and wrecked near Cuxhaven. She was on a voyage from Havre de Grâce, Seine-Inférieure to Hamburg.
Aura	Netherlands	The ship was sighted in the Øresund whilst on a voyage from Amsterdam, North Holland to Helsinki, Grand Duchy of Finland. No further trace, presumed foundered with the loss of all hands.
Chesapeake	United Kingdom	The brig was driven ashore at Boston, Massachusetts, United States. She was refloated the next day.
Effort	United States	The ship was destroyed by an explosion at New York.
Halcyon	United Kingdom	The ship struck the Tuckermuck Shoal, off the coast of Massachusetts, United States and was consequently beached at Nantucket, Massachusetts. She was on a voyage from Pictou, Nova Scotia, British North America to Boston, Massachusetts.
Lady Mary	United Kingdom	The ship was driven ashore in Carnarvon Bay. She was on a voyage from Comarca Lagunera, Mexico to Liverpool, Lancashire.
Liverpool Packet	United Kingdom	The ship was driven ashore and wrecked on the Burry Holms, Glamorgan.
Malvina	(United Kingdom of Great Britain and Ireland) British North America	The ship was driven ashore at Miramichi, New Brunswick. Her crew were rescued. She was on a voyage from Labrador to Chaleur Bay.
Martha Kingsman	United States	The ship was driven ashore at Boston. She was on a voyage from Lisbon, Portugal to Boston. She was refloated the next day.
Seaflower	(United Kingdom of Great Britain and Ireland) British North America	The schooner was discovered abandoned in the Atlantic Ocean by Pratincole (United Kingdom). She was towed into Moray Bay.

=== 8 October ===
List of shipwrecks: 8 October 1843
Ship	State	Description
Clorinda	United Kingdom	The ship was driven ashore at Dungeness, Kent. She was on a voyage from London to Bonny, Nigeria. She was refloated and put in to Ramsgate, Kent in a leaky condition.
Felice	France	The ship was lost at "Cape Lahon", Africa.
Nymphe	Hamburg	The schooner capsized off "Kohlbrandt". Her crew were rescued.
Rising Sun	United Kingdom	The ship was wrecked on the Alacranes. Her crew were rescued. She was on a voyage from La Guayra, Venezuela to Liverpool, Lancashire.

== 9 October ==
List of shipwrecks: 9 October 1843
Ship	State	Description
Endeavour	United Kingdom	The ship was wrecked on the South Gar, off the mouth of the River Tees. Her crew were rescued.
Europe	United Kingdom	The ship was driven ashore and wrecked at the mouth of the Narva River. Her crew were rescued. She was on a voyage from Dundee, Forfarshire to Narva, Russia.
Five Sisters	United Kingdom	The ship was wrecked on the South Gar with the loss of her captain. The other crew member was rescued by the Seaton Lifeboat.
Friendship	(United Kingdom of Great Britain and Ireland) New South Wales	The cutter was driven ashore and wrecked at Red Head with the loss of one of her three crew.
John Daniel	United States	The ship capsized off "Meline", Finistère, France. she subsequently drove ashore at "Parsal". Her crew were rescued. She was on a voyage from New York to Stettin.
Mary Barbara	United Kingdom	The ship ran aground on the Mayapore Sand. She was on a voyage from Calcutta, India to the Cape of Good Hope and London.

== 10 October ==
List of shipwrecks: 10 October 1843
Ship	State	Description
Ann Kenny	United Kingdom	The ship was driven ashore in the Magdalen Islands, Nova Scotia, British North America. She was on a voyage from London to Prince Edward Island, British North America. She was refloated on 18 October and towed into Canso, Nova Scotia.
Clemence	Belgium	The schooner ran aground at Constantinople, Ottoman Empire. She was refloated on 12 October.
Ellen	United Kingdom	The ship sprang a leak and sank off Burnham Overy Staithe, Norfolk.
Emerald	France	The ship ran aground on the Roamer Shoals. She was on a voyage from Havre de Grâce, Seine-Inférieure to Boston, Massachusetts, United States. Emerald was refloated the next day and taken into Boston.
Hero	United Kingdom	The ship ran aground on the Mayapore Sand.
Kunchau Mallah	(United Kingdom of Great Britain and Ireland) Ceylon	The brig was wrecked off Barberyn. She was on a voyage from Negapatam to Colombo.
NRP Liberty	Portuguese Navy	The schooner was abandoned in the Atlantic Ocean. All 41 people on board were rescued by the barque Sir John Beresford (United Kingdom). NRP Liberty was on a voyage from Angola to Lisbon.

== 11 October ==
List of shipwrecks: 11 October 1843
Ship	State	Description
Alert	United Kingdom	The ship was driven ashore and severely damaged at Donaghadee, County Down. She was refloated on 28 October.
Alpha	United Kingdom	The ship was driven ashore at Belfast, County Antrim. She was on a voyage from Ardrossan, Ayrshire to Dublin
Atkin	United Kingdom	The ship was driven ashore and damaged at Hendon, County Durham. She was refloated on 21 October and taken in to Sunderland.
Blackett	United Kingdom	The ship was driven ashore and damaged at Hendon. She was refloated on 19 October and taken into Sunderland.
British Queen	United Kingdom	The paddle steamer was holed whilst on a voyage from Greenock, Renfrewshire to Dumbarton. She put back to Greenock, where she sank after her passengers and crew were landed. British Queen was refloated on 24 October and taken in to Glasgow for repairs.
Charles and Anne	United Kingdom	The ship foundered off Inchkeith, in the Firth of Forth.
Euphemia	United Kingdom	The ship was driven ashore and wrecked at Sunderland, County Durham. Her crew were rescued by Dennett's Apparatus.
Gemini	United Kingdom	The ship was driven ashore and damaged at Sunderland. Her crew were rescued by Dennett's Apparatus. She was refloated on 21 October and taken in to Sunderland.
Mathilde	Prussia	The ship foundered off Mort Point, Glamorgan, United Kingdom. She was on a voyage from Newport, Monmouthshire, United Kingdom to Kiel.
Mary Ann	United Kingdom	The schooner sprang a leak was abandoned in the Irish Sea. All but one of her crew drowned when their boat capsized. She was on a voyage from Newcastle upon Tyne, Northumberland to Strangford Lough.
Miriam	United Kingdom	The ship was driven ashore and severely damaged at Sunderland. She was refloated on 21 October and taken in to Sunderland.

== 12 October ==
List of shipwrecks: 12 October 1843
Ship	State	Description
Active	France	The schooner was driven ashore and wrecked at Whitburn, County Durham, United Kingdom with the loss of all hands.
Active	Imperial Russian Navy	The sloop-of-war was driven ashore and sank in the Man-of-War's Hole, near Saint Petersburg. Her crew were rescued.
Amelia	United Kingdom	The brig was driven ashore at Coatham, Yorkshire. Her crew were rescued. She was on a voyage from London to Stockton-on-Tees, County Durham. Amelia was refloated on 23 October and taken into the River Tees.
Amicita	Netherlands	The ship departed from Danzig for Amsterdam, North Holland. No further trace, presumed foundered with the loss of all hands.
Anna Margaretha	Netherlands	The ship was driven ashore at Berwick upon Tweed, Northumberland, United Kingdom. Her crew were rescued. She was on a voyage from Dordrecht, South Holland to Grangemouth, Stirlingshire, United Kingdom.
Antina or Artina	Kingdom of Hanover	The galiot was wrecked at Middlesbrough, North Riding of Yorkshire, United Kingdom. Her crew were either rescued or all lost along with a pilot.
Ark	United Kingdom	The ship was driven ashore at Seaham, County Durham. Her crew were rescued.
Autumnus or Vertumnus	United Kingdom	The ship was driven ashore south of Middlesbrough. Her crew were rescued. She was refloated on 23 October and towed into Sunderland, County Durham.
Barleycorn	United Kingdom	The sloop was wrecked on the Haunley Rock, on the coast of Northumberland. Her crew were rescued.
Britannia	United Kingdom	The smack sank in the Wallet Channel, off the coast of Essex. Her crew were rescued by Fanny (United Kingdom).
Britannia	United Kingdom	The ship was driven ashore and wrecked on the north east coast of England.
Brothers	United Kingdom	The ship was wrecked on the Herd Sand, in the North Sea off the coast of County Durham. Her crew were rescued. She was refloated on 23 October and taken into South Shields, County Durham.
Busy	United Kingdom	The brig was driven ashore near Redcar, Yorkshire. Her crew were rescued.
Carolus	Kingdom of Hanover	The ship was in collision with Catherine Sophia (flag unknown) and was severely damaged. She was beached at "Dithmar". She was on a voyage from the Elbe to Vlissingen, Zeeland, Netherlands.
Charles and Ann	United Kingdom	The ship was driven ashore and wrecked on the north east coast of England.
Cleveland	United Kingdom	The ship was driven ashore at Hartlepool. She was refloated on 21 October.
Constant	United Kingdom	The schooner was driven ashore on Governors Island, New York, United States. She was on a voyage from New York to Saint Thomas, Virgin Islands.
Curlew	United Kingdom	The schooner was driven ashore at Coatham. Her crew were rescued. She was on a voyage from Dordrecht to Stockton-on-Tees. Curlew was refloated on 23 October and taken into the River Tees.
David Howe or David Owen	United Kingdom	The ship was driven ashore at Stockton-on-Tees, County Durham. She was refloated on 25 October.
Delft	Netherlands	The schooner was driven ashore at Cullercoats, County Durham. Her crew were rescued. She was on a voyage from Dordrecht, South Holland to Grangemouth. Delft was refloated on 23 October and taken into the River Tyne for repairs.
Edinburgh	United Kingdom	The smack was driven ashore at Lindisfarne, Northumberland.
Esther	United Kingdom	The ship was driven ashore at Seaham, County Durham. Her crew were rescued. She was refloated on 23 October and taken in to South Shields.
Genuine	United Kingdom	The ship was driven ashore at Sunderland.
Gesina	Bremen	The ship was driven ashore on Saaremaa, Russia. She was on a voyage from Bremen to Saint Petersburg. She was refloated and taken into Orenburg.
Helena Maria	Kingdom of Hanover	The ship was driven ashore and wrecked near Burnmouth, Berwickshire. Her crew were rescued. She was on a voyage from Papenburg to Grangemouth.
Henry and Thomas	United Kingdom	The ship was driven ashore and wrecked in Red Wharf Bay, Anglesey. One crew member was rescued. She was on a voyage from Dublin to Liverpool, Lancashire.
Henry Roop	United States	The schooner foundered. Her crew survived.
Idogheten	Sweden	The ship was lost off "Storjungfra". Her crew were rescued.
Industry	United Kingdom	The ship struck the Skate Rock, in Strangford Lough and sank. Her crew were rescued. She was refloated on 21 October and taken into Strangford, County Antrim.
Jane	United Kingdom	The ship was driven ashore at "Saltham" with the loss of a crew member. She was on a voyage from Hamburg to Sunderland.
John Emalen	United Kingdom	The schooner was destroyed by fire off Hartlepool. Her crew were rescued by the Hartlepool Lifeboat.
John Innes	United Kingdom	The schooner was wrecked on the Long Scar Rocks, in the North Sea. Her crew were rescued by a lifeboat.
Margaret	United Kingdom	The brig was driven ashore south of Middlesbrough.
Margaret	United Kingdom	The brig was driven ashore and wrecked at Hartlepool.
Maria and Amelia	United Kingdom	The schooner was driven ashore and wrecked at Linkheads, east of Dunbar, Lothian. Her crew were rescued. She was on a voyage from Aberdeen to Newcastle upon Tyne, Northumberland.
Mary	United Kingdom	The brigantine was driven ashore and wrecked on the Ravensheugh Rock, Tyninghame, Lothian. Her six crew survived. She was on a voyage from Dordrecht, South Holland, Netherlands to Grangemouth, Stirlingshire. Mary was refloated on 25 November and taken in to Dunbar.
Mary Ann	United Kingdom	The ship was driven ashore at South Shields, County Durham. She was on a voyage from Licata, Sicily to South Shields. She was refloated.
Minerva	United Kingdom	The ship was driven ashore south of Middlesbrough.
Nairns	United Kingdom	The barque was driven ashore at South Shields. She was on a voyage from Marseille, Bouches-du-Rhône, France to South Shields. She was refloated on 21 October.
Providence	United Kingdom	The sloop was driven ashore near Redcar. Her crew were rescued.
Providence	France	The ship was driven ashore near Boulogne Pas-de-Calais. Her crew were rescued. She was on a voyage from the Île de Ré to Abbeville, Somme.
Rosanna	France	The brig collided with Lotus (United Kingdom) and foundered in the Grand Banks of Newfoundland. Her crew were rescued.
Self	United Kingdom	The schooner was driven ashore at Skinningrove, Yorkshire. Her crew were rescued.
Sibsons	United Kingdom	The ship was driven ashore at Blyth, Northumberland.
Spidwell	United Kingdom	The ship was driven ashore and wrecked at Fishguard, Pembrokeshire. She was on a voyage from Bangor to Bristol, Gloucestershire.
Star	United Kingdom	The ship was driven ashore on the Jarrow Stake.
Starkotter	Sweden	The ship was driven ashore and wrecked at Söderhamn. All on board were rescued.
Sylph	United Kingdom	The schooner was driven ashore at Skinningrove, Yorkshire. She was refloated on 24 October and towed into Sunderland.
Thomas Burdon	United Kingdom	The brig was driven ashore south of Middlesbrough. Her crew were rescued.
Three Brothers	United Kingdom	The sloop was driven ashore and wrecked at Tetney Haven, Lincolnshire. Her crew were rescued. She was on a voyage from Grimsby to Louth.
Two Brothers	United Kingdom	The ship was wrecked on the Herd Sand. Her crew survived. She was refloated on 23 October and towed into North Shields, County Durham.
Unity	United Kingdom	The ship was driven ashore south of Middlesbrough.
Visitor	United Kingdom	The ship was driven ashore at Whitby, Yorkshire.
Vriendschap	Netherlands	The ship departed from Danzig for Grangemouth. No further trace presumed foundered with the loss of all hands.
William and Jane	United Kingdom	The ship was driven ashore at Saltburn, Yorkshire with the loss of a crew member. She was on a voyage from Hamburg to Sunderland. She was refloated on 24 October and towed in to Sunderland.

== 13 October ==
List of shipwrecks: 13 October 1843
Ship	State	Description
Christine	Norway	The ship was wrecked on the Scheeren, off the Swedish coast.
Emerald	United Kingdom	The schooner was abandoned in the Irish Sea. She came ashore and was wrecked at Ballintoy, County Antrim.
Emperor	United Kingdom	The ship was sighted off Anjer, Spanish East Indies whilst on a voyage from Liverpool, Lancashire to Macao. No further trace.
Flora	United Kingdom	The ship was driven ashore on Sylt, Duchy of Schleswig. She was on a voyage from the Elbe to Stockton-on-Tees, County Durham.
Harriet	United Kingdom	The brig was driven ashore at Seaham. Her crew survived. She was refloated on 6 November and taken in to Seaham.
Henry and Thomas	United Kingdom	The ship was wrecked in Red Wharf Bay, Anglesey with the loss of all but one of her crew. She was on a voyage from Dublin to Liverpool, Lancashire.
Providence	United Kingdom	The ship was wrecked on Hogland. She was on a voyage from Saint Petersburg, Russia to Topsham, Devon.
Repute	United Kingdom	The ship was wrecked on the East Hoyle Sandbank, in Liverpool Bay. Her crew were rescued. She was on a voyage from Leith, Lothian to Liverpool, Lancashire.
Waterloo	United Kingdom	The ship was driven ashore at Middlesbrough, Yorkshire.
Whim	United Kingdom	The ship was wrecked on "Stoneskar". Her crew were rescued. She was on a voyage from Hull, Yorkshire to Saint Petersburg, Russia.

== 14 October ==
List of shipwrecks: 14 October 1843
Ship	State	Description
Amelia	United Kingdom	The cutter was driven ashore at Scarborough, Yorkshire. She was later refloated.
Caroline	United Kingdom	The sloop was driven ashore and wrecked in Tyrrell's Bay.
Delphin	(Denmark) Duchy of Schleswig	The ship was driven ashore and wrecked at Wittow, Rügen. Her crew survived. She was on a voyage from Ystad, Sweden to Rendsburg.
Hilda	United Kingdom	The ship was driven ashore and wrecked on "Kunho Island". She was on a voyage from Whitby, Yorkshire to Vyborg, Grand Duchy of Finland.
Tvende Sostre	Netherlands	The ship was driven ashore and wrecked near Scheveningen, South Holland with the loss of a crew member. She was on a voyage from a Scottish port to Dordrecht, South Holland.

== 15 October ==
List of shipwrecks: 15 October 1843
Ship	State	Description
Active	United Kingdom	The schooner was wrecked near the Marsden Rock, County Durham with the loss of all four crew. She was on a voyage from Rouen, Seine-Inférieure, France to Newcastle upon Tyne, Northumberland.
Margaretha Maria	(Denmark) Duchy of Schleswig	The ship was driven ashore near Ventava, Courland Governorate.
Mexican	United Kingdom	The full-rigged ship was wrecked on the Red Bank, off the coast of the Gambia Colony.

== 16 October ==
List of shipwrecks: 16 October 1843
Ship	State	Description
Adolphe	Grand Duchy of Tuscany	The ship was wrecked in the Black Sea. She was on a voyage from Livorno to Odesa.
Alpha	United Kingdom	The ship was driven ashore at Campbeltown, Argyllshire. She was on a voyage from Arkhangelsk, Russia to Gloucester.
Aurora	Kingdom of Hanover	The ship was wrecked on the Barysand. Her crew were rescued. She was on a voyage from Emden to a Norwegian port.
Carl Christina	Danzig	The ship ran aground on the Goodwin Sands, Kent, United Kingdom. She was on a voyage from Liverpool, Lancashire, United Kingdom to Danzig. She was refloated and put into Ramsgate, Kent.
Fokkea Engelina	Bremen	The ship ran aground on the Koningsplatte and sank. Her crew were rescued. She was on a voyage from Newcastle upon Tyne, Northumberland, United Kingdom to Rönnebeck.
Four Sisters	United Kingdom	The ship departed from Troon, Ayrshire for Dublin. No further trace, presumed foundered with the loss of all hands.
James Walls	United Kingdom	The schooner was driven ashore and wrecked near Havre de Grâce, Seine-Inférieure, France with the loss of two of her six crew, Survivors were rescued by the brigs Antelope and Peggy (both United Kingdom).
Martha	United Kingdom	The ship was driven ashore at Passage West, County Cork. She had been refloated by 9 November.
Templar	United Kingdom	The ship was driven ashore between Libava, Courland Governorate and Palanga, Russia.
Thomas and Elizabeth	United Kingdom	The brig was driven ashore at Honfleur, Calvados, France. She was refloated and resumed her voyage.
Ücker	Prussia	The ship was driven ashore between Liepāja and Palanga.
Waterwitch	United Kingdom	The ship was driven ashore at Passage West.

== 17 October ==
List of shipwrecks: 17 October 1843
Ship	State	Description
Adonis	United Kingdom	The ship was run into and severely damaged in the North Sea off the coast of Yorkshire. She was abandoned the next day. Her six crew were rescued by Shepherd (United Kingdom). Adonis sank on 22 October.
Alcide	France	The ship ran aground at Quillebeuf-sur-Seine, Eure. She was refloated the next day.
Amiable	United Kingdom	The ship was driven ashore and wrecked at Calais, France with the loss of all but her captain. She was on a voyage from Sunderland, County Durham to Liverpool, Lancashire.
Aurora	Kingdom of Hanover	The ship was wrecked on the Bang Sand. Her crew were rescued. She was on a voyage from Emden to a Norwegian port.
Ceres	United Kingdom	The ship was driven ashore and wrecked at "St. Minoin", Cornwall. She was on a voyage from Portsmouth, Hampshire to a Welsh port.
Ceres	Norway	The ship was driven ashore at Boulogne, Pas-de-Calais, France. Her crew were rescued. She was on a voyage from Christiansand to Saint-Valery-sur-Somme, Somme, France. She was refloated on 21 October and taken into Boulogne.
Charlotte	United Kingdom	The ship was abandoned in the Irish Sea off Point Lynas, Anglesey. Her crew were rescued by Caledonia (United Kingdom). Charlotte was on a voyage from Liverpool to Newry, County Antrim.
Ebenezer	United Kingdom	The ship was driven ashore at Trevine, Cornwall. She became a wreck on 19 October.
Ebenezer	United Kingdom	The sloop was driven ashore 17 nautical miles (31 km) west of Fishguard, Pembrokeshire with the loss of a crew member. She was on a voyage from Newport, Monmouthshire to Liverpool.
Eleanor	United Kingdom	The ship was driven ashore and wrecked at Hartlepool, County Durham. Her crew were rescued.
Eliza	United Kingdom	The ship was lost off Bideford. Her crew were rescued.
Elizabeth Sophie	United Kingdom	The ship was driven ashore at Honfleur, Calvados.
Emelie et Desirée	France	The ship ran aground at Quillebeuf-sur-Seine. She was refloated the next day.
Emma	United Kingdom	The ship was driven ashore at Teignmouth, Devon. She was on a voyage from Goole, Yorkshire to Teignmouth.
Emma	United Kingdom	The barque was driven onto the Nayland Rock, Margate, Kent and sank. Her crew were rescued. She was on a voyage from British Honduras to London.
Emperor	United Kingdom	The ship was driven ashore and wrecked near Blakeney, Norfolk. All six people on board were rescued.
Ganges	United Kingdom	The brig was driven ashore and sank at Bideford. Her nine crew were rescued by the Bideford Lifeboat. She was on a voyage from Cardiff, Glamorgan to London. Ganges had become a wreck by 30 October.
Gaugh Owen	United Kingdom	The ship was driven ashore at Bideford, where she was subsequently wrecked. She was on a voyage from a Welsh port to London.
Good Intent	United Kingdom	The ship was driven ashore at Plymouth, Devon. She was refloated on 19 October.
Halcyon	United Kingdom	The ship ran aground on the Tuckernock Shoals. She was on a voyage Pictou, Nova Scotia, British North America to Boston, Massachusetts, United States.
Hannibal	United Kingdom	The ship was driven ashore at Bideford. She was on a voyage from London to Swansea, Glamorgan.
Harry Bluff	(United Kingdom of Great Britain and Ireland) New South Wales	The schooner foundered off Bideford with the loss of all hands.
Haylet	Norway	The ship was driven ashore at Hartlepool. She was on a voyage from Dram to Hartlepool.
Hope	United Kingdom	The brig was wrecked at Pentire, Cornwall with the loss of all hands.
Hunter	United Kingdom	The ship was driven ashore west of Cley-next-the-Sea, Norfolk. She was on a voyage from London to Louth, Lincolnshire.
Industry	United Kingdom	The sloop foundered in the English Channel west of the Isle of Wight with the loss of all hands. She was on a voyage from Swanage, Dorset to Cowes, Isle of Wight.
James Walls	United Kingdom	The ship was driven ashore and wrecked at Havre de Grâce, Seine-Inférieure, France. Her crew were rescued.
Jane	United Kingdom	The ship was driven ashore at Great Yarmouth, Norfolk. She was on a voyage from London to Hartlepool, County Durham.
Jane	United Kingdom	The ship was driven ashore and wrecked at Havre de Grâce. Her crew were rescued. She was on a voyage from Sunderland to Rouen, Seine-Inférieure.
Jane Margaret	United Kingdom	The schooner ran aground at Quillebeuf-sur-Seine. She was refloated the next day.
Jessie	United Kingdom	The ship was driven ashore at Bideford.
King William	United Kingdom	The ship was driven ashore at Hartlepool. She was on a voyage from Arkhangelsk, Russia to Hull, Yorkshire. She was refloated the next day and taken into Hartlepool.
Leselliers	United Kingdom	The ship was driven ashore in Bruffton Bay. She was on a voyage from Bristol, Gloucestershire to Llanelly, Glamorgan. She was refloated on 19 October and taken in to Llanelly.
Letitia	United Kingdom	The ship was driven ashore and sank at Padstow, Cornwall. She was on a voyage from Newport, Monmouthshire to a Dutch port. She was refloated the next day.
Lord Durham	United Kingdom	The brig was driven ashore and wrecked at Havre de Grâce. Her crew were rescued. She was on a voyage from Sunderland to Rouen.
Margaret	United Kingdom	The ship was driven ashore at Scarborough, Yorkshire. Her crew were rescued. She was on a voyage from Hartlepool to London. She became a wreck on 28 October.
Mary and Jessie	United Kingdom	The ship was driven ashore at Ramsey, Isle of Man. She was refloated on 21 October.
Mayflower	United Kingdom	The ship was driven ashore near Tetney. She was on a voyage from Louth to London.
Menai	United Kingdom	The ship was driven ashore at Horsey, Norfolk. She was on a voyage from Hull, Yorkshire to Dublin. Menai was refloated on 24 October and taken into Great Yarmouth.
Neptune	United Kingdom	The collier was in collision with the brig Boleno (United Kingdom) off Grimsby, Lincolnshire. Neptune was consequently beached between Cleethorpes and Tetney, where she was wrecked. She was on a voyage from Stockton-on-Tees, County Durham to Rochester, Kent.
Norman	United Kingdom	The schooner was driven ashore at Plymouth, Devon. All on board were rescued. She was on a voyage from Alicante, Spain to London.
Olga	Russia	The ship departed from Saint Petersburg for Lübeck. No further trace, presumed foundered with the loss of all hands.
Peggy and Jane or Peggy and Jenny	United Kingdom	The ship was driven ashore and wrecked at Greystones, County Wicklow. Her crew were rescued.
Planter	United Kingdom	The ship was driven ashore under Dover Castle, Kent. She was on a voyage from Eastbourne, Sussex to Sunderland, County Durham. She was refloated on 19 October.
Raven	United Kingdom	The ship was wrecked at "Mellick", Cornwall. Her crew were rescued. She was on a voyage from Newport or Cardiff, Glamorgan to Southampton, Hampshire.
Sampson	United Kingdom	The ship was driven ashore at Whitby, North Riding of Yorkshire. She was refloated on 19 October and taken into Whitby.
Sea Nymph	Kingdom of Hanover	The ship was driven ashore at Seaton, County Durham.
Sedulous	United Kingdom	The barque was driven ashore and wrecked at "Mellick", Cornwall with the loss of two of her crew. She was on a voyage from Cardiff to London.
Söderhamn	Sweden	The ship ran aground on the Shipwash Sand, in the North Sea off the coast of Essex, United Kingdom. She was on a voyage from Söderhamn to London. She was refloated and resumed her voyage.
Superior	United Kingdom	The ship was driven ashore at Northam, Devon. She was on a voyage from Cork to a Welsh port. Superior was refloated on 19 October.
Success	United Kingdom	The ship foundered in the North Sea off Huntleyfoot, Aberdeenshire.
Three Sisters	United Kingdom	The Humber Keel was run down and sunk in the Humber off Sunk Island, Yorkshire by the fishing smack William and Richard (United Kingdom) with the loss of six of the eight people on board.
York	United Kingdom	The ship was driven ashore and wrecked at Hartlepool. Her crew were rescued.

== 18 October ==
List of shipwrecks: 18 October 1843
Ship	State	Description
Autumnus	United Kingdom	The ship was driven ashore on the Isle of Sheppey, Kent. She was refloated and taken into The Swale.
Betsys	United Kingdom	The ship was driven ashore on Schouwen, Zeeland, Netherlands. Her crew were rescued. She was on a voyage from Rotterdam, South Holland, Netherlands to Kingston upon Hull, Yorkshire.
Burhampooter	United Kingdom	The ship was driven onto the Foreness Rock, Margate, Kent and was wrecked. All on board, 90 passengers plus her crew, were rescued. She was on a voyage from London to Port Phillip, New South Wales.
Celerity	United Kingdom	The ship was driven ashore at Blakeney, Norfolk. She was refloated on 22 October.
Christine	Flag unknown	The ship was wrecked on the Scheeren, off Stockholm, Sweden.
Cumberland	United Kingdom	The ship was driven ashore near Tetney, Lincolnshire.
Drain	United Kingdom	The schooner was driven ashore and wrecked at Hartlepool, County Durham.
Elisabeth Sophia	France	The ship ran aground on a sandbank east of Honfleur, Calvados.
Forager	United Kingdom	The ship was driven ashore 3 nautical miles (5.6 km) north of Grimsby, Lincolnshire. She was on a voyage from Louth, Lincolnshire to Leeds, Yorkshire.
Friendship	United Kingdom	The ship was driven ashore at Bacton, Norfolk.
Haabet	Norway	The ship was driven ashore south of Hartlepool. She was on a voyage from Dram to Scarborough, Yorkshire. Haabet was refloated on 21 October and taken into Hartlepool.
James Gibson	United Kingdom	The ship was driven ashore in the Dardanelles. She was on a voyage from Trieste to Constantinople, Ottoman Empire. She was refloated the next day with assistance from Pericles (United Kingdom) and completed her voyage.
Lark	United Kingdom	The ship was driven ashore at Hartlepool. She was on a voyage from Newcastle upon Tyne, Northumberland to Great Yarmouth, Norfolk.
Libra	United Kingdom	The brig was wrecked on the Sunk Sand with the loss of all eleven crew. She was on a voyage from Arkhangelsk, Russia to London.
Margaret	United Kingdom	The brig was driven ashore and sank at Scarborough, Yorkshire. She was on a voyage from Blyth, Northumberland to London. Her crew were rescued by the Scarborough Lifeboat.
Maria	United Kingdom	The ship was driven ashore at Stiffkey, Norfolk.
Martin	France	The ship was driven ashore and wrecked at Boulogne, Pas-de-Calais. Her crew were rescued by the Boulogne Lifeboat. She was on a voyage from the Île de Ré, Charente-Maritime to Abbeville, Somme
Mary and Jessie	United Kingdom	The sloop was driven ashore at Ramsey, Isle of Man. She was on a voyage from Liverpool, Lancashire to Dumfries.
Miriam	United Kingdom	The ship was driven ashore at Grimsby.
New Good Intent	United Kingdom	The schooner was driven ashore and damaged at Staithes, Yorkshire. Her crew were rescued. She was refloated on 20 October.
Republicaine	United Kingdom	The ship was driven ashore at Grimsby.
Success	United Kingdom	The schooner foundered off Whitby. Her four crew took to a boat but two of them drowned when it capsized. Survivors were rescued by the Whitby Lifeboat.
Symmetry	United Kingdom	The ship collided with Voyager (United Kingdom and sank in the North Sea off Happisburgh, Norfolk with the loss of a crew member. She was on a voyage from Maldon, Essex to Sunderland, County Durham.
Union	United Kingdom	The ship was driven ashore at Brancaster, Norfolk. Her crew were rescued. She was refloated on 22 October.
Unity	United Kingdom	The ship was driven ashore west of Wells-next-the-Sea, Norfolk. She was refloated on 22 October.
Valentina	United Kingdom	The brig was driven ashore at Tetney.

== 19 October ==
List of shipwrecks: 19 October 1843
Ship	State	Description
Amiable Jenny	United Kingdom	The ship was driven ashore and wrecked at Calais, France with the loss all but her captain. She was on a voyage from Sunderland, County Durham to Liverpool, Lancashire.
Barbara	United Kingdom	The ship was driven ashore and wrecked at Lissewege, West Flanders, Belgium with the loss of her captain. She was refloated on 26 October and taken into Ostend, West Flanders.
Britannia	United Kingdom	The ship was driven ashore on the Hale. She was on a voyage from London to Blyth, Northumberland.
Emily	United Kingdom	The ship was driven ashore and wrecked at Weybourne, Norfolk with the loss of two of her crew. Survivors were rescued by the Coast Guard using Dennett's rocket apparatus.
Fortuna	Denmark	The ship was driven ashore on the Hale. She was on a voyage from Aalborg to Hull, Yorkshire, United Kingdom.
Friends	United Kingdom	The sloop was driven ashore at Thornham, Norfolk. she was on a voyage from London to Leeds, Yorkshire. She was refloated on 22 October.
Livonia	France	The ship was driven ashore and wrecked at Riga, Russia. Her crew were rescued. She was on a voyage from Cette, Hérault to Riga.
Mary	United Kingdom	The ship was driven ashore at Bridlington, Yorkshire. She was on a voyage from Newcastle upon Tyne, Northumberland to London. She was refloated the next day.
Odin	United Kingdom	The ship was driven ashore on the Hale. She was on a voyage from London to South Shields, County Durham.
St. George	(United Kingdom of Great Britain and Ireland) British North America	The paddle steamer was driven ashore on "Isle Plat", Province of Canada.
Thetis	United Kingdom	The ship was driven ashore at Tetney Haven, Lincolnshire. She was refloated on 23 October and taken into Grimsby, Lincolnshire.
Triro	Portugal	The ship was wrecked on Santa anna, Cape Verde Islands. All on board were rescued. She was on a voyage from Lisbon to Maranhão, Brazil.
True Briton	United Kingdom	The ship was driven ashore at Tetney Haven. She was refloated on 23 October and taken into Grimsby.
Welcome	United Kingdom	The ship was driven ashore on the Hale.

== 20 October ==
List of shipwrecks: 20 October 1843
Ship	State	Description
Amelia	United Kingdom	The ship was driven ashore at Narva, Russia. Her crew were rescued.
Anna Catherina	Prussia	The ship was driven ashore at Liebau. Her crew were rescued. She was on a voyage from Königsburg to Amsterdam, North Holland, Netherlands.
Barbara	United Kingdom	The brig was driven ashore near Blankenberge, West Flanders, Belgium.
Egyptian	United Kingdom	The barque was wrecked on the Red Bank, off the coast of the Gambia Colony and Protectorate. She was on a voyage from Gravesend, Kent to Sierra Leone.
Godfrey	United Kingdom	The ship was driven ashore at "Palsky". She was on a voyage from Liverpool, Lancashire to Pillau, Prussia. Godfrey was refloated on 27 October and taken into Pillau.
Hunters	United Kingdom	The ship was driven ashore at Narva.
Margaret	United Kingdom	The schooner was driven ashore at "Cape Luco", Egypt. She was on a voyage from Liverpool to Alexandria, Egypt.
Sylph	United Kingdom	The ship was wrecked at Tönningen, Duchy of Holstein. She was on a voyage from Liverpool to Fredrikstad, Norway.
Tino	United Kingdom	The ship ran aground on the Goodwin Sands, Kent. She was refloated and continued on her voyage to Shoreham-by-Sea, Sussex.
Union	United Kingdom	The ship foundered near Egersund, Norway with the loss of all hands. She was on a voyage from Liverpool to Swinemünde, Prussia.
Vine	United Kingdom	The sloop was driven ashore and damaged on the Boulmer Rocks, Northumberland. She was later refloated.
Zephyr	United Kingdom	The brigantine was driven ashore at Macinaggio, Corsica, France. She was on a voyage from Livorno, Grand Duchy of Tuscany to London. Zephyr was refloated and put back to Livorno for repairs.

== 21 October ==
List of shipwrecks: 21 October 1843
Ship	State	Description
Adonis	United Kingdom	The ship was in collision with another vessel and foundered in the North Sea. Her crew were rescued by Shepherd (United Kingdom.
Challenger	United Kingdom	The ship was wrecked on a rock off Bryher, Isles of Scilly. Her crew were rescued. She was on a voyage from Smyrna, Ottoman Empire to London.
Eendraght	Netherlands	The ship departed from Grangemouth, Stirlingshire, United Kingdom for Dordrecht, South Holland. No further trace, presumed foundered with the loss of all hands.
Fortuna	Russia	The koff was abandoned off Bolderāja. She was subsequently taken into Riga.
Godfrey	United Kingdom	The ship was driven ashore at "Polosky", Prussia. Her crew were rescued. She was on a voyage from Liverpool, Lancashire to Pillau, Prussia.
Hope	United Kingdom	The ship ran aground on the Nore. She was on a voyage from Limerick to London. She was refloated and taken in tow for London.
Lady Clinton	United Kingdom	The ship was driven ashore at Filey, Yorkshire. She was on a voyage from Dover, Kent to South Shields, County Durham. Lady Clinton floated off on 5 December and sank.
L'Aigle	France	The brig ran aground on the Goodwin Sands, Kent, United Kingdom. She was on a voyage from Newcastle upon Tyne, Northumberland, United Kingdom to Cette, Hérault. She was refloated and taken into Broadstairs, Kent in a sinking condition.
Maria	United Kingdom	The ship sprang a leak and foundered in the North Sea off the Dudgeon Lightship ( Trinity House). Her crew were rescued by the smack Rising Sun (United Kingdom. Maria was on a voyage from Newcastle upon Tyne to Dunkirk, Nord, France.
Powhattan	United States	The ship was wrecked on a reef off Cabrita Point, Spain. Her crew were rescued. She was on a voyage from Marseille, Bouches-du-Rhône, France to New York.
Wanderer	United Kingdom	The ship was driven ashore 6 nautical miles (11 km) from Valencia, Spain with the loss of a crew member.

== 22 October ==
List of shipwrecks: 22 October 1843
Ship	State	Description
Blossom; John	United Kingdom	The ships were in collision in the North Sea off Happisburgh, Norfolk. Both sank, with the loss of a crew member from Blossom, which was on a voyage from South Shields, County Durham to London.
Caledonia	(United Kingdom of Great Britain and Ireland) British North America	The brigantine was wrecked at Rocky Bay, Nova Scotia. Her crew were rescued. She was on a voyage from Liverpool, Lancashire, United Kingdom to Halifax, Nova Scotia.
Hirondelle	Belgium	The brig was wrecked on the North Gallega Reef. She was on a voyage from Antwerp to Veracruz, Mexico.
Honora	United Kingdom	The ship ran aground off Aberystwyth, Cardiganshire and was damaged. She was on a voyage from Aberystwyth to Flint, Flint. Honora was refloated and taken into Aberystwyth.
Prince de Joinville	Hamburg	The ship ran aground on the Osby Reef, of the east coast of Öland, Sweden. She was on a voyage from Riga, Russia to Hamburg. She was refloated on 2 November and taken into Helsingør, Denmark in a leaky condition.
Superb	United Kingdom	The ship was driven ashore near Candia, Crete, She was on a voyage from "Porto Ferrara" to Newfoundland, British North America.
Truta	Norway	The ship was wrecked on the Sorekholm Reef. Her crew were rescued. She was on a voyage from Arensburg to Perno, Grand Duchy of Finland.

== 23 October ==
List of shipwrecks: 23 October 1843
Ship	State	Description
Andromache	United Kingdom	The ship ran aground and capsized on the Whitebooth Middle, in the Humber, with the loss of four of her crew. She was on a voyage from Quebec City, Province of Canada, British North America to Hull, Yorkshire. She was righted on 25 October and taken into Hull.
Annette Dorothea	Sweden	The ship sprang a leak and put into the Tragddefjord, where she was beached. She was on a voyage from Karlskrona to Aberdeen, United Kingdom.
Atalanta	Russia	The ship ran aground on the Goodwin Sands, Kent, United Kingdom. Her crew were rescued. She was on a voyage from St. Ubes, Portugal to Riga. She was refloated on 27 October and towed into Kingsgate Bay.
Harmonie	Netherlands	The ship was wrecked on Breaksea Point, Glamorgan, United Kingdom. Her crew were rescued.
Hermes	United Kingdom	The ship struck the pier and was severely damaged at Bridport, Dorset. She was on a voyage from Riga to Bridport.
Mary	United Kingdom	The ship sprang a leak and foundered in the North Sea. Her crew were rescued. She was on a voyage from Goole, Yorkshire to King's Lynn, Norfolk.
Mercurius	Netherlands	The ship departed from New York, United States for Rotterdam, South Holland. No further trace, presumed foundered with the loss of all hands.
Nathalie	France	The ship was driven ashore near Moddergate, Friesland, Netherlands. Her crew survived. She was on a voyage from Saint Petersburg, Russia to Havre de Grâce, Seine-Inférieure.
Redlichkeit	Denmark	The ship ran aground of Skagen. She was on a voyage from Hyères, Var, France to Helsingør. She was refloated and put into Gothenburg, Sweden.
Susannah	United Kingdom	The ship was driven ashore on the Cefn Patrick Sand, Glamorgan. She was on a voyage from London to Llanelly, Glamorgan. She was refloated the next day and taken into Llanelly.
Vestal	United Kingdom	The barque sprang a leak and foundered in the Ionian Sea 40 nautical miles (74 km) off Cephalonia, United States of the Ionian Islands. Her crew survived. She was on a voyage from London to Corfu, Greece.

== 24 October ==
List of shipwrecks: 24 October 1843
Ship	State	Description
Anna Hedewig	Denmark	The ship was driven ashore near Lemvig. Her crew survived. She was on a voyage from Copenhagen to Ringkøbing.
Anne	United Kingdom	The ship struck a rock off Gullholm, Norway and was holed. She was on a voyage from Pillau, Prussia to Cockenzie, Lothian. She put into Elfwefjord and then made for Gothenburg or Uddewalla, Sweden for repairs.
Canton	United Kingdom	The ship was wrecked on Green Island, British North America. Her crew were rescued.
Dodo	United Kingdom	The sailing barge was discovered abandoned off Walton-on-the-Naze, Essex and was taken in to Harwich.
Gerhard Hermann	Bremen	The ship was driven ashore at Marfleet, Yorkshire, United Kingdom. She was on a voyage from Bremen to Hull, Yorkshire. She was refloated the next day and taken into Hull.
Jane Helen	United Kingdom	The ship was abandoned in the North Sea 70 nautical miles (130 km) east south east of South Shields, County Durham with the loss of two of her eight crew. She was on a voyage from Newcastle upon Tyne, Northumberland to London.
Mary	United Kingdom	The ship was driven ashore and damaged at Great Yarmouth, Norfolk. She was on a voyage from Newcastle upon Tyne, Northumberland to Marseille, Bouches-du-Rhône, France. She was refloated and taken into Great Yarmouth.
Native Lass	United Kingdom	The schooner was driven ashore near the Boston Lighthouse, Massachusetts, United States and was abandoned by her crew. She was later refloated.
St. Nadishda	Russia	The ship was driven ashore near Port Kunda. She was on a voyage from Narva to Reval.
Sovereign	United Kingdom	The ship was driven ashore at Stromness, Orkney Islands. She was on a voyage from New York, United States to Hull. She was refloated on 5 November and taken into Stromness.

== 25 October ==
List of shipwrecks: 25 October 1843
Ship	State	Description
Anns	United Kingdom	The ship was wrecked on Hogland, Russia. Her crew were rescued. She was on a voyage from Saint Petersburg, Russia to London.
Banbury	United Kingdom	The ship was driven ashore near Cuxhaven. She was refloated.
Elizabeth	(United Kingdom of Great Britain and Ireland) British North America	The ship was wrecked at Fishermans Harbour, Nova Scotia. Her crew were rescued.
Falconer	United Kingdom	The brig ran aground on the Gunfleet Sand, in the North Sea off the coast of Essex and was abandoned by all but her captain. She was refloated with the aid of the smacks Good Agreement and Rambler (both United Kingdom) and taken in tow for the River Colne.
Johann	Stettin	The ship was driven ashore at Hogenes, Denmark. She was on a voyage from London to Stettin.. She was refloated and taken into Helsingør, Denmark for repairs.
Packet	United Kingdom	The sloop was wrecked at Cardigan with the loss of all hands.
Spheroid	United Kingdom	The ship ran aground on the Goodwin Sands, Kent. She was on a voyage from London to Saint Vincent. She was refloated.

== 26 October ==
List of shipwrecks: 26 October 1843
Ship	State	Description
Desire	France	The ship was wrecked at "Motiets". Her crew were rescued. She was on a voyage from Mesquer, Loire-Inférieure to Bayonne, Basses-Pyrénées.

== 27 October ==
List of shipwrecks: 27 October 1843
Ship	State	Description
Amity	United Kingdom	The ship was driven ashore at Tetney Haven, Lincolnshire. Her crew were rescued. She was on a voyage from Great Yarmouth, Norfolk to Goole, Yorkshire.
Anna	United Kingdom	The ship sprang a leak and was beached at Warkworth, Northumberland, where she was wrecked. Her crew were rescued. She was on a voyage from Blyth, Northumberland to Rouen, Seine-Inférieure, France.
Britannia	United Kingdom	The ship ran aground on the Horse Bank, in the Irish Sea off the mouth of the River Ribble. She was on a voyage from Liverpool, Lancashire to Bahia, Brazil. She was refloated and put back to Liverpool in a leaky condition.
Britannia	United Kingdom	The ship was abandoned in the English Channel off Start Point, Devon. Her crew were rescued by a Prussian vessel. She was on a voyage from South Shields, County Durham to Plymouth, Devon, or Neath, Glamorgan to London.
Catherine and Ellen	United Kingdom	The schooner was driven ashore at Teignmouth, Devon. Her five crew were rescued by Manby Mortar. She was on a voyage from Portsmouth, Hampshire to Belfast, County Antrim. Catherine and Ellen was refloated on 8 November and taken into Teignmouth.
Friendship	United Kingdom	The schooner sprang a leak and sank in The Downs. Her crew were rescued. She was on a voyage from Great Yarmouth to Shoreham-by-Sea, Sussex.
Honoratius	United Kingdom	The schooner was wrecked in Bull Bay. Her crew were rescued. she was on a voyage from Chester, Cheshire to Dublin.
Jane	United Kingdom	The ship was driven ashore and damaged at Douglas, Isle of Man. She was on a voyage from Liverpool, Lancashire to Port William, Wigtownshire. She was refloated.
Kate	United Kingdom	The schooner was abandoned off The Mumbles, Glamorgan. She was taken into Swansea the next day.
Kingsbridge	United Kingdom	The ship was driven ashore and wrecked at Southend-on-Sea, Essex. she was on a voyage from Salcombe, Devon to London.
Knaresborough Castle	United Kingdom	The ship was driven ashore at Woodbridge, Suffolk. She was on a voyage from Stockton-on-Tees, County Durham to London.
Marietta	France	The ship was wrecked on the Long Sand, in the North Sea off the coast of Essex, United Kingdom. Her crew were rescued. She was on a voyage from Newcastle upon Tyne, Northumberland to Nantes, Loire-Inférieure.
Nimble	United Kingdom	The schooner departed from Hayle, Cornwall for Llanelly, Glamorgan. No further trace, presumed foundered that night with the loss of all hands.
Prince Albert	United Kingdom	The ship was holed by an anchor and sank in Angle Bay. She was on a voyage from Newport, Monmouthshire to Youghal, County Cork. She was refloated on 4 August and beached at Angle.
Sovereign	United Kingdom	The ship was driven ashore and wrecked in Belle Grieve Bay, Guernsey, Channel Islands. Her crew were rescued. She was on a voyage from Jersey, Channel Islands to London.
William	United Kingdom	The sloop was wrecked on the North Bank, in Liverpool Bay. Her five crew were rescued. She was on a voyage from Drogheda, County Louth to Liverpool.

== 28 October ==
List of shipwrecks: 28 October 1843
Ship	State	Description
Æschylus	United Kingdom	The ship was abandoned in the North Sea 20 nautical miles (37 km) west north west of the Farne Islands, Northumberland. Her crew were rescued. She was on a voyage from Seaham, County Durham to London.
Active	United Kingdom	The ship was driven ashore at The Mumbles, Glamorgan. She was refloated on 20 November.
Albion	United Kingdom	The ship was driven ashore and wrecked at Rhyl, Denbighshire. Her crew were rescued. She was on a voyage from Glasgow, Renfrewshire to Liverpool, Lancashire.
Alice	United Kingdom	The ship was driven ashore at Ramsgate, Kent. She was on a voyage from London to "Henly".
Alonzo	United Kingdom	The ship was driven ashore at Bideford, Devon and was abandoned by her crew.
Anne	United Kingdom	The schooner was driven ashore at Pwllheli, Caernarvonshire. She was on a voyage from London to Caernarfon.
Anne	United Kingdom	The ship was driven ashore and wrecked at Warkworth, Northumberland. Her crew were rescued.
Archimede	Norway	The ship ran aground off Wardoe. She was on a voyage from Porsgrund to London. She was refloated and taken in to Wardoe.
Ardent	United Kingdom	The ship was driven ashore at Ramsgate.
Asia	United Kingdom	The barque was driven ashore and damaged at "Varyd", Denbighshire. Her crew were rescued. She was on a voyage from the Rio Grande to Liverpool. Asia was refloated on 4 November and taken in to Liverpool.
Athol	United Kingdom	The ship was driven ashore and sank at Corton, Suffolk. Her crew were rescued.
Bellona	United Kingdom	The ship was driven ashore and sank at Aberystwyth, Cardiganshire. She was on a voyage from Newport, Monmouthshire to Balbriggan, County Dublin.
Bell Rock	United Kingdom	The ship was driven ashore at The Mumbles. She was refloated on 7 November.
Betsey	United Kingdom	The ship was driven ashore at Ramsgate.
Branch	United Kingdom	The schooner was driven ashore 3 nautical miles (5.6 km) east of Dunbar, Lothian. Her crew were rescued. She was on a voyage from Bordeaux, Gironde, France to Leith, Lothian. Branch was refloated on 28 December and taken in to Dunbar for repairs.
Bristol Trader	United Kingdom	The ship was driven ashore and wrecked at Cardigan with the loss of all hands.
Britannia	United Kingdom	The ship was driven ashore at Formby, Lancashire. She was on a voyage from Bahia, Brazil to Liverpool.
Buoyant	United Kingdom	The ship ran aground and sank at the Isle of Lewis, Outer Hebrides. Her crew were rescued. She was on a voyage from Kirkcaldy, Fife to Londonderry.
Caledonia	United Kingdom	The ship was driven ashore at Liverpool. She was on a voyage from British North America to Liverpool.
Caroline	(United Kingdom of Great Britain and Ireland) Van Diemen's Land	The brig was driven ashore and wrecked in Lagoon Bay, New South Wales.
Catherine	United Kingdom	The ship was driven ashore at Pwllheli. She was refloated on 13 November.
Catherine	United Kingdom	The ship was holed by her anchor and sank at The Mumbles. She was refloated on 30 October and put into Swansea.
Clipper	United Kingdom	The ship was driven ashore and damaged at Blyth, Northumberland. She was on a voyage from Hull, Yorkshire to Blyth. She was refloated on 2 November and taken into Blyth.
Cossack	United Kingdom	The ship was driven ashore at Abergele, Denbighshire.
Cygnet	United Kingdom	The brig was wrecked on the Gunfleet Sand, in the North Sea off the coast of Essex. Her crew were rescued. She was on a voyage from Stockton-on-Tees, County Durham to London.
Decisive	United Kingdom	The ship was driven ashore and wrecked at Fishguard, Pembrokeshire. Her crew were rescued. She was on a voyage from Newport to Drogheda, County Louth.
Defiance	United Kingdom	The ship was driven ashore and wrecked west of Arbroath, Forfarshire. She was on a voyage from London to Arbroath.
Dinorwick	United Kingdom	The ship foundered off Fishguard, Pembrokeshire. She was on a voyage from Newport to Drogheda, County Louth. Dinorwick was refloated on 8 November and taken into Fishguard.
Economy	United Kingdom	The schooner sank off Puffin Island, Anglesey with the loss of all hands. She was on a voyage from Liverpool, Lancashire to Newry, County Antrim. She was refloated on 3 November and taken into Beaumaris, Anglesy.
Eleanor	United Kingdom	The ship was wrecked on the Barnard Sand, in the North Sea off the coast of Norfolk with the loss of all hands.
Eliza	United Kingdom	The ship was wrecked on the Shingles Sand, off the coast of Kent. Her crew were rescued. She was on a voyage from Danzig to Jersey, Channel Islands.
Eliza	United Kingdom	The ship was driven ashore at Ramsgate.
Eliza	United Kingdom	The brig was driven ashore at Manila, Spanish East Indies.
Endeavour	United Kingdom	The brig was wrecked at Southsea Castle, Hampshire.
Fair Hope	United Kingdom	The ship ran aground on the Booth Sand. She was on a voyage from Bristol, Gloucestershire to Aberavon, Glamorgan. She was refloated on 4 November and taken into Aberdyfi, Merionethshire.
Favourite	United Kingdom	The ship was driven ashore and wrecked at Bude, Cornwall. Her crew were rescued. She was on a voyage from Cardiff, Glamorgan to Rotterdam, South Holland, Netherlands.
Fawn	United Kingdom	The ship collided with Hibernia (United Kingdom) and foundered in the Irish Sea with the loss of two of her crew. She was on a voyage from Caernarvon to Glasgow.
George	United Kingdom	The ship was wrecked on the Knock Sand, in the North Sea off the coast of Lincolnshire.
George	United Kingdom	The ship was driven ashore at Sunderland. She was later refloated and taken into Sunderland.
Georges	United Kingdom	The ship was driven ashore at Filey, Yorkshire. Her crew were rescued by some cobles. She was on a voyage from Arbroath, Forfarshire to Hull.
Gleaner	United Kingdom	The schooner was driven ashore at Pwllheli. She was on a voyage from Liverpool to Limerick.
Golden Fleece	United Kingdom	The ship foundered in the Bristol Channel off Minehead, Somerset. She was on a voyage from Kinsale, County Cork to Cardiff.
Gratitude	United Kingdom	The ship was driven ashore at Ramsgate.
Hampton	United Kingdom	The brig was driven ashore at Cardigan. She was on a voyage from Liverpool to Marseille, Bouches-du-Rhône, France. Hampton was refloated on 1 November. She was repaired and returned to service.
Hibernia	United Kingdom	The brig was driven ashore at Beaumaris, Anglesey. She was on a voyage from Workington, Cumberland to Dublin. She was refloated and taken into Holyhead.
Hooton	United Kingdom	The brig was driven ashore and wrecked at Porthdinllaen, Caernarvonshire. Her crew were rescued. She was on a voyage from Fleetwood, Lancashire to Portmadoc.
Johanne Eugenine	Norway	The ship was driven ashore at Lerwick, Shetland Islands, United Kingdom.
John and Mary	United Kingdom	The ship was driven ashore at Great Yarmouth, Norfolk. She was on a voyage from Wisbech, Cambridgeshire to London. John and Mary was later refloated and taken into Great Yarmouth.
John Guise	United Kingdom	The ship was driven ashore at Ramsgate.
Juno	Heligoland	The yacht was driven ashore and wrecked at List auf Sylt, Duchy of Holstein.
Kingston	United Kingdom	The ship ran aground on the Shingles Sand, in the North Sea off the coast of Kent. She was on a voyage from Newcastle upon Tyne, Northumberland to Corfu, Greece. Kingston was refloated on 30 October.
Lady Bentinck	United Kingdom	The ship was driven ashore and wrecked at Formby. Her crew were either all lost or rescued.
Lavinia	United Kingdom	The ship was wrecked in Cardigan Bay. Her crew were rescued.
Lily	United Kingdom	The ship was driven ashore in Carnarvon Bay.
London	United Kingdom	The ship was driven ashore at "Essington", Lincolnshire. Her crew were rescued. She was on a voyage from Peterhead, Aberdeenshire to London.
Lord of the Isles	United Kingdom	The ship was driven ashore at Cardigan. Her crew were rescued. She was on a voyage from Jersey, Channel Islands to Whitehaven, Cumberland. She had become a wreck by 18 November.
Lynx	United Kingdom	The ship was wrecked in Cardigan Bay. Her crew were rescued. She was on a voyage from Liverpool to Limerick.
Margaret	United Kingdom	The brig was lost at Aberdeen.
Margareta	United Kingdom	The ship ran aground and sank at Barmouth, Caernarvonshire with the loss of all hands. She was refloated on 25 August 1849.
Margaret and Ann	United Kingdom	The ship was driven ashore in Cardigan Bay. Her crew were rescued. She was on a voyage from Newport to Dublin.
Marina	United Kingdom	The ship was wrecked on the Sheringham Shoals, in the North Sea off the coast of Norfolk. Her crew were rescued. She was on a voyage from Hartlepool, County Durham to London.
Marquis of Wellington	United Kingdom	The sloop was driven ashore and wrecked at Holyhead, Anglesey. Her crew were rescued. She was on a voyage from Runcorn, Cheshire to Newry, County Antrim. She was refloated on 4 November and taken into Holyhead.
Mary	United Kingdom	The smack was driven ashore and wrecked near Cardigan with the loss of all hands.
Mary	United Kingdom	The ship was driven ashore at The Mumbles. She was refloated on 9 November.
Mary Ann	United Kingdom	The ship was driven ashore and wrecked at Porthdinllaen. She was on a voyage from Aberystwyth to Ghent, West Flanders, Belgium.
Mary Ann	United Kingdom	The ship was driven ashore at Great Yarmouth. She was on a voyage from Rouen, Seine-Inférieure, France to Warkworth. Mary Ann was later refloated and taken into Great Yarmouth.
Merlin	United Kingdom	The ship was driven ashore at The Mumbles. She was refloated on 20 November.
Meshom	United Kingdom	The ship was wrecked near Lowestoft with loss of life.
Mozart	Netherlands	The ship was driven ashore at Vlissingen, Zeeland. She was on a voyage from Rotterdam, South Holland to New Orleans, Louisiana, United States. She was refloated the next day and taken into Vlissingen for repairs.
Nancy	United Kingdom	The ship was run into by Falcon (United Kingdom and sank in the North Sea off Great Yarmouth with the loss of five of her crew.
Nasborough Castle	United Kingdom	The ship was driven ashore at Felixtowe, Suffolk. Her crew were rescued. She was on a voyage from "Stackworth" to London.
Neleus	United Kingdom	The ship was wrecked near Lowestoft with loss of life.
Nettle	United Kingdom	The ship was driven ashore and damaged on Walney Island, Lancashire with the loss of all hands. She was on a voyage from Ulverstone to Liverpool. Nettle was refloated on 14 November and put in to Runcorn, Cheshire.
Nile	United Kingdom	The brig foundered in the Irish Sea 10 nautical miles (19 km) off Great Orme, Caernarfonshire with the loss of all hands.
Packet	United Kingdom	The smack was driven ashore and wrecked anear Cardigan with the loss of all hands.
Pandora	United Kingdom	The ship was driven ashore south of Helsingør, Denmark. She was on a voyage from Riga, Russia to Newcastle upon Tyne. She was refloated.
Peggy	United Kingdom	The ship was driven ashore at The Mumbles. She was refloated on 20 November.
Perseverance	United Kingdom	The ship was driven ashore at Hastings, Sussex. She was on a voyage from Saint-Valery-en-Caux, Seine-Inférieure, France to Rye, Sussex.
Peter	United Kingdom	The ship was driven ashore at Colwyn, Denbighshire.
Peter and Rebecca	United Kingdom	The ship was driven ashore at Port Isaac, Cornwall.
Petrel	United Kingdom	The ship was driven ashore at Hartlepool. She was later refloated and taken in to Hartlepool.
Pomona	United Kingdom	The ship was driven ashore west of Dunbar. Her crew were rescued. She was on a voyage from Rotterdam, South Holland, Netherlands to Grangemouth, Stirlingshire. She was refloated on 13 November.
Port Revel	Russia	The ship was driven ashore at Great Yarmouth. She was later refloated and taken into Great Yarmouth.
Providence	(United Kingdom of Great Britain and Ireland) Jersey	The smack was driven ashore and wrecked at Porthdinllaen.
Rapid	United Kingdom	The ship was driven ashore in the Humber. She was on a voyage from Memel, Prussia to Gainsborough, Lincolnshire.
Roberts	United Kingdom	The ship was abandoned in the Irish Sea off The Skerries, Anglesey. Her crew were rescued by Marietta (United Kingdom. Roberts was on a voyage from Liverpool to Dundalk.
Rosamond and Jane	United Kingdom	The ship was driven ashore at Pwllheli. she was on a voyage from Chester, Cheshire to Bristol.
Rose	United Kingdom	The ship was wrecked in Porthor Bayfs. Her crew were rescued. She was on a voyage from Liverpool to Dublin.
Royal Oak	United Kingdom	The ship was driven ashore at Ramsgate.
Salathiel	United Kingdom	The ship was driven ashore at Aberystwyth. She was on a voyage from Newport to Aberdeen. Salathiel was refloated on 30 October.
Sally	United Kingdom	The ship was driven ashore near Southwold, Suffolk with the loss of her captain. She was on a voyage from Goole, Yorkshire to Harwich, Essex. Sally was refloated on 5 November and taken into Southwold.
Salus	United Kingdom	The ship was driven ashore at Colwyn.
Sarah	United Kingdom	The ship was driven ashore and severely damaged north of Whitby, Yorkshire. Her crew were rescued. She was refloated on 3 November and taken into Whitby for repairs.
Sprightly	United Kingdom	The ship was driven ashore and wrecked at Margate. Her crew were rescued. She was on a voyage from South Shields, County Durham to Jersey.
Spring	United Kingdom	The ship was driven ashore and damaged at Bridlington, Yorkshire. She was on a voyage from London to Bridlington. Spring was refloated on 30 October and taken into Bridlington.
Stamford	United Kingdom	The sloop was driven ashore in the River Ribble at Longton, Lancashire. All on board survived.
Swallow	United Kingdom	The smack was driven ashore and wrecked at Great Yarmouth. She was on a voyage from London to Hull.
Swan	United Kingdom	The ship was driven ashore at Pwllheli. She was refloated on 13 November.
Swan	United Kingdom	The ship was driven ashore at Pwllheli. She was on a voyage from Barmouth to Liverpool.
Swift	United Kingdom	The ship was driven ashore at Weston-super-Mare, Somerset. She was on a voyage from Newport to Uphill, Somerset.
Two Brothers	United Kingdom	The ship was driven ashore and wrecked at Porthdinllaen.
Tynemouth	United Kingdom	The brig struck the Barnard Sand and was subsequently driven ashore and wrecked at Kessingland, Suffolk. Her crew were rescued. She was on a voyage from Newcastle upon Tyne to London.
Union	United Kingdom	The ship was driven ashore at Deal, Kent.
Unity	United Kingdom	The ship was wrecked at Wainfleet, Lincolnshire. She was on a voyage from London to Wisbech, Cambridgeshire.
Unity	United Kingdom	The ship was driven ashore at Hartlepool.
William and Mary	United Kingdom	The ship ran aground on the Longsand, in the North Sea off the coast of Essex. She was on a voyage from Stettin to London. She was refloated and resumed her voyage.
Windsor	United States	The ship was driven ashore near the "Brea de Juraco", Cuba. Her crew were rescued. She was on a voyage from Boston, Massachusetts to Havana, Cuba.

== 29 October ==
List of shipwrecks: 29 October 1843
Ship	State	Description
Ailsa Craig	United Kingdom	The paddle steamer was severely damaged by fire at St. Katherine's Dock, London.
Anna	United Kingdom	The brig foundered in the North Sea 25 nautical miles (46 km) off the Tynemouth Lighthouse, Northumberland. Her crew survived the sinking, but were lost when the longboat capsized.
Anna Madalina	Hamburg	The ship foundered in the North Sea off the mouth of the Elbe. Her crew were rescued. She was on a voyage from Blankenese to Amsterdam, North Holland, Netherlands.
Anne	United Kingdom	The ship was driven ashore and wrecked at Warkworth, Northumberland. Her crew were rescued.
Aristocrat	United Kingdom	The ship was driven ashore at Blackpool, Lancashire with the loss of two lives. She was on a voyage from Montreal, Province of Canada, British North America to Liverpool, Lancashire. Aristocrat was refloated on 4 November and taken in to Liverpool.
Calliope	United Kingdom	The ship ran aground on the Goodwin Sands, Kent. She was on a voyage from Saint John's, Newfoundland, British North America to Hull, Yorkshire. Calliope was refloated and towed in to Hull, where she arrived on 1 November.
Clyde	United Kingdom	The ship was driven ashore at Liverpool, Lancashire. She was on a voyage from Quebec City, Province of Canada, British North America to Liverpool.
Diana	United Kingdom	The ship was driven ashore and wrecked at Cemaes, Anglesey. She was on a voyage from Dublin to Liverpool.
Ellen	United Kingdom	The ship was driven ashore and wrecked at Blackpool with the loss of all five crew.
Finance	United Kingdom	The ship was driven ashore 1 nautical mile (1.9 km) north of Sunderland, County Durham. She was on a voyage from Fredrikstad, Norway to Sunderland. She was refloated on 4 November and taken in to Sunderland.
Frances	United Kingdom	The brig was abandoned in the North Sea 35 nautical miles (65 km) off Tynemouth, Northumberland. Her six crew were rescued by Esk (United Kingdom). She was on a voyage from London to Sunderland. Frances was towed into Sunderland on 31 October.
Hebe	Hamburg	The ship ran aground at Cuxhaven. She was on a voyage from Hamburg to Fredrikstad, Norway.
Henrietta	United Kingdom	The schooner was driven ashore near Amlwch, Anglesey. Her crew were rescued. She was on a voyage from Chester, Cheshire to Dublin.
Hibernia	United Kingdom	The paddle steamer ran aground off Moelfre, Anglesey. She was on a voyage from Dublin to Liverpool. She was refloated on 4 November and taken into Beaumaris or Holyhead, Anglesey.
Liska	United Kingdom	The ship was driven ashore at Llanddwyn, Anglesey. She was on a voyage from Liverpool to Waterford.
Maréchal de Villars	France	The ship was driven ashore and severely damaged at Fécamp, Seine-Inférieure. She was on a voyage from Dunkirk, Nord to Havre de Grâce, Seine-Inférieure.
Mariette	France	The ship was wrecked on the Longsand, in the North Sea off the coast of Essex, United Kingdom. Her crew were rescued. She was on a voyage from Sunderland, County Durham, United Kingdom to Nantes, Loire-Inférieure.
Nancy	United Kingdom	The ship was driven ashore at Lowestoft, Suffolk with the loss of a crew member.
Nova Sociedade	Portugal	The ship was driven ashore and damaged at Faro. She was consequently condemned.
Sir Edward Banks	United Kingdom	The ship was driven ashore at "Llanhaidom". Her crew were rescued.
Sisters	United Kingdom	The ship was driven ashore at Hurst Castle, Hampshire. She was on a voyage from Newcastle upon Tyne, Northumberland to Weymouth, Dorset. She was refloated on 7 November.
Sylph	United Kingdom	The trawl-boat was driven ashore and wrecked 6 nautical miles (11 km) south of Ravenglass, Cumberland with the loss of all hands.
Tjalk Catherina	Bremen	The ship foundered off Bremerhaven. Her crew were rescued. She was on a voyage from Varel, Kingdom of Hanover to Bremen.
Undeb	United Kingdom	The ship was driven ashore at "Pwllylanymo", Caernarfonshire. Her crew were rescued.
Union	United Kingdom	The ship foundered off Egersund, Norway with the loss of all hands. She was on a voyage from Liverpool to Swinemünde, Prussia.
Vernon	(United Kingdom of Great Britain and Ireland) Isle of Man	The sloop was driven ashore at Formby. Her crew survived. She was on a voyage from Castletown, Isle of Man to Liverpool.
Victoria	United Kingdom	The brig was driven ashore at Dungeness, Kent. Her crew were rescued. She was on a voyage from Rouen, Seine-Inférieure, France to South Shields, County Durham. Victoria was consequently condemned. She was refloated on 7 November and towed into Ramsgate, Kent.

== 30 October ==
List of shipwrecks: 30 October 1843
Ship	State	Description
Amethyst	United Kingdom	The brig ran aground on the Pont de Nieges Bank, in the English Channel off the coast of Seine-Inférieure, France. She was on a voyage from Sunderland, County Durham to Honfleur, Calvados. She was refloated and taken in to Havre de Grâce, Seine-Inférieure for repairs.
Arethusa	United Kingdom	The ship was driven ashore near "Beeby". Her crew were rescued. She was on a voyage from Saint Petersburg, Russia to Newcastle upon Tyne, Northumberland.
Gustav Wasa	Sweden	The ship ran aground on the Shipwash Sand, in the North Sea off the coast of Essex, United Kingdom. She was on a voyage from South Shields, County Durham to Barcelona, Spain. She was refloated and taken into Harwich, Essex.
Janet	United Kingdom	The ship was driven ashore at Formby, Lancashire or Red Wharf Bay, Anglesey. Her crew were rescued. She was on a voyage from "Lockmilford" to Liverpool.
Jeanette	United Kingdom	The ship ran aground on the Pampas. She was on a voyage from Hellevoetsluis, Zeeland to Batavia, Netherlands East Indies. She was later refloated.
Louis	France	The ship was driven ashore at the mouth of the Llobregat, Spain with the loss of five of her crew. She was on a voyage from Newfoundland, British North America to Marseille, Bouches-du-Rhône.
Mary	United Kingdom	The brig was driven ashore at Formby with the loss of one of her twelve crew. She was on a voyage from British Honduras to Liverpool.
Matilda	United Kingdom	The brig foundered in the Guaitecas Archipelago, Chile. Her crew survived. She was on a voyage from Valparaíso, Chile to Buenos Aires, Argentina.
Norskelone	Norway	The ship was driven ashore at Knokke, West Flanders, Belgium. She was on a voyage from Sundsvall to Antwerp, Belgium. She was refloated and resumed her voyage.
Princess van Oranje de Boer	Netherlands	The ship ran aground on the Pampas. She was on a voyage from Hellesvoetsluis to Jakarta. She was later refloated.
Rose	United Kingdom	The ship was lost near Bardsey Island, Lancashire.
Tres Amigos	(Spain) Cuba	The ship was driven ashore at Margate, Kent, United Kingdom. She was on a voyage from Hamburg to Cuba. She was refloated and taken into Westgate Bay. She resumed her voyage on 11 November.

== 31 October ==
List of shipwrecks: 31 October 1843
Ship	State	Description
John Burrell	United Kingdom	The ship was driven ashore near Gallipoli, Ottoman Empire. She was later refloated.
Mary Ann	United Kingdom	The ship ran aground on the Niding Reef, in the Baltic Sea and was wrecked. Her crew were rescued. She was on a voyage from Danzig to Portsmouth, Hampshire.
Orwell	United Kingdom	The ship was driven ashore on Saltholm, Denmark. She was on a voyage from Saint Petersburg, Russia to London. She was refloated and resumed her voyage.
Parlau	Norway	The ship was driven ashore near Lysekil. She was on a voyage from Amsterdam, North Holland, Netherlands to Dram.

== Unknown date ==
List of shipwrecks: Unknown date in October 1843
Ship	State	Description
Abbotsford	United Kingdom	The barque was wrecked in Algoa Bay before 20 October.
Ann and Laura	United Kingdom	The ship was lost in the English Channel in late October.
Arcturus	United States	The ship was driven ashore at Buenos Aires, Argentina between 8 and 10 October.
Caroline	(United Kingdom of Great Britain and Ireland) Van Diemen's Land	The brig was driven ashore and wrecked in Lagoon Bay.
City of Durham	United Kingdom	The ship was wrecked 60 nautical miles (110 km) west of Ventspils, Russia in mid-October. Her crew were rescued. She was on a voyage from Hartlepool, County Durham to Riga, Russia.
Colonist	United Kingdom	The ship ran aground and was wrecked off Saint Croix, Virgin Islands before 13 October. Her crew were rescued. She was on a voyage from Newport, Monmouthshire to Saint Thomas, Virgin Islands.
Ebor	United Kingdom	The barque was driven ashore at Lark Point, Province of Canada, British North America before 14 October. She was on a voyage from Liverpool, Lancashire to Quebec City, Province of Canada. She was later refloated and taken in to Quebec City, where she arrived on 27 October.
Eliza	United Kingdom	The ship ran aground on The Shingles, off the north Kent coast and sank before 29 October.
Emerentine	(United Kingdom of Great Britain and Ireland) British North America	The schooner foundered before 24 October. Six crew were rescued by Derwent (United Kingdom). Emerentine was on a voyage from Anticosti Island Province of Canada to Chaleur Bay.
Freden	Norway	The brig foundered in the English Channel off the coast of Somme, France before 26 October. She was on a voyage from Arendal to Dieppe, Seine-Inférieure, France.
Hannah	United Kingdom	The ship was driven ashore at Bude, Cornwall. She was on a voyage from "the Alonzo" to Cardiff, Glamorgan. She was refloated on 26 March 1845 and taken in to Bude.
Imperador	Stettin	The ship was wrecked off "Hvaloern" before 30 October.
Jeans	United Kingdom	The ship was driven ashore in Loch Don. She was on a voyage from Saint Petersburg, Russia to Liverpool. She was refloated and put in to Oban, Argyllshire, where she arrived on 23 October.
La Laure	United Kingdom	The chasse-marée ran aground and sank at Littlehampton, Sussex, United Kingdom. She was on a voyage from Dieppe, Seine-Inférieure to Bordeaux, Gironde.
Margaretta	United Kingdom	The smack was wrecked at St Dogmaels, Cardiganshire with the loss of three of her crew. She was on a voyage from Gloucester to Bridgwater, Somerset and Lancaster, Lancashire.
Matilda	United Kingdom	The ship sprang a leak and foundered in the Pacific Ocean off the Chiloé Archipelago, Chile in late October. Her crew were rescued. She was on a voyage from Valparaíso, Chile to Buenos Aires, Argentina.
Providence	United Kingdom	The ship foundered in the North Sea before 21 October.
Rebecca	(United Kingdom of Great Britain and Ireland) South Australia	The barque was wrecked on Kings Island, Van Diemen's Land with the loss of three of her crew. She was on a voyage from Batavia, Netherlands East Indies to Port Phillip.
Rory O'More	United Kingdom	The schooner foundered at the mouth of the Barrier Harbour, New Zealand before 31 October.
Silistria	Russia	The ship was wrecked off the Seven Islands before 5 October. Her crew were rescued. She was on a voyage from Arkhangelsk to Dublin, United Kingdom.
Sir James Cockburn	United Kingdom	The whaler was wrecked near Muscat before 28 October. Her crew were rescued.
Sydney	United Kingdom	The ship ran aground off Key Vacas. She was on a voyage from British Honduras to England. She was refloated and put into Key West, Florida Territory, where she arrived on 18 October.
Veitch	United Kingdom	The schooner was driven ashore at Tetuan, Morocco before 7 October. She was refloated in January 1844 and towed in to Gibraltar by HMS Locust (Royal Navy). She arrived on 23 January.
Victorua	United Kingdom	The ship was driven ashore at Aberlady, Lothian in late October.
Wanstead	United Kingdom	The ship foundered in the Atlantic Ocean. Her crew were rescued by Apollo (United Kingdom).
