= Passchendaele =

Passchendaele or Paschendale may refer to:

== Places ==
- Passchendaele, Queensland, a locality in Australia
- Paschendale, Victoria, a locality in Australia
- Passendale or Passchendaele, a town in Belgium and a World War I battlefield site
  - Passchendaele Ridge, a ridge near the village
- Passchendaele, Nova Scotia

== Other uses ==
- Passchendaele (film), a Canadian film
- "Paschendale" (song), a 2003 song by Iron Maiden
- Passchendaele (battle honour), a battle honour awarded to units of the British and Imperial Armies
- Battle of Passchendaele, a World War I military campaign

== See also ==
- First Battle of Passchendaele, a constituent battle of the Battle of Passchendaele
- Passiondale (album), an album by God Dethroned
- Second Battle of Passchendaele, a constituent battle of the Battle of Passchendaele
