= CA 87 =

CA 87 may refer to:

- California State Route 87, abbreviated as CA-87
- Caproni Ca.87, a long-distance aircraft
