= Pyjama problem =

Mathematical problem about tiling the plane with stripes

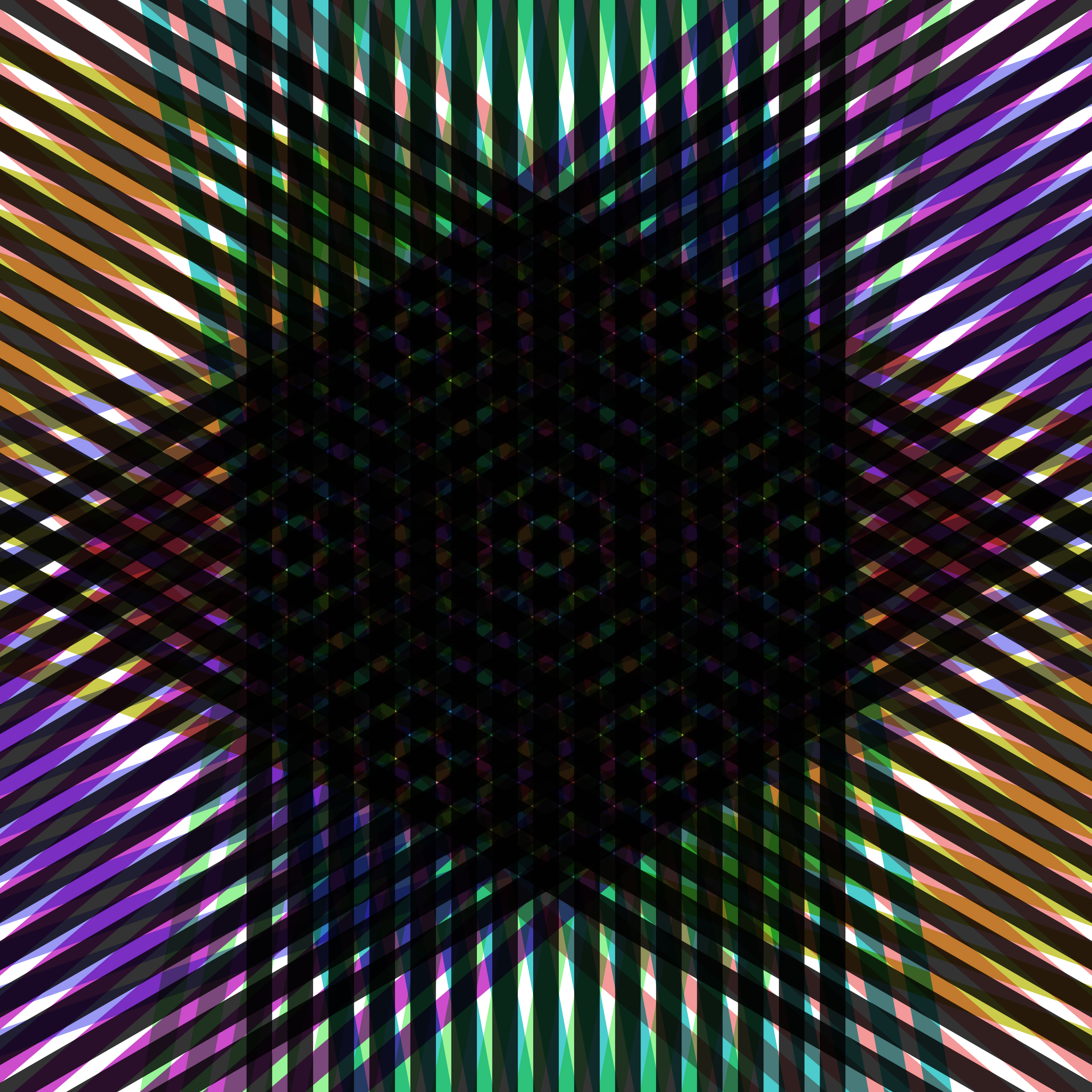
A solution to the pyjama problem with stripe radius 1/3 - 1/48 using 9 angles, as described by Malikiosis, Matolcsi & Ruzsa (2013, Theorem 3.1)

In mathematics, the pyjama problem asks whether the plane can be covered by a finite number of rotated copies of a repeating pattern of stripes ("pyjama stripes"), no matter how thin the stripes are. The problem was posed in 2006 by Alex Iosevich, Mihail Kolountzakis, and Máté Matolcsi. It was answered in the affirmative by Freddie Manners in 2015, using an analogy with Furstenberg’s ×2, ×3 Theorem.

== Quantitative bounds ==
Let $E(\varepsilon) := \{z \in \mathbb{C}: \mathrm{Re}(z) \in (-\varepsilon, \varepsilon) \pmod{1}\}$ be the pyjama stripe of width $2\varepsilon$. Noah Kravitz and James Leng proved that $\exp\exp\exp(\varepsilon^{-O(1)})$ rotations of $E(\varepsilon)$ about the origin are sufficient to cover $\mathbb{C}$, hence obtaining an explicit upper bound for the pyjama problem. It remains an open problem to obtain lower bounds for the pyjama problem beyond the trivial volume preserving bound of $\varepsilon^{-1}/2$.

== See also ==
- Affine plank problem, on covering a constant body by stripes of small total relative width
- Tarski's plank problem, on covering bounded sets by stripes
