= Ambrose F. Church =

American-Canadian cartographer

Ambrose Finson Church (24 October 1838 — 19 February 1920) was an American-born Canadian mapmaker.

Church spent several years in Bedford, Nova Scotia, creating very detailed plans of the various counties and towns of the Province in the mid-1800s, which were published by his company A. F. Church & Co. These plans included the names of individuals living in the areas surveyed.

In 1864, Church offered to make plans of various parts of the Province based on detailed surveys. Halifax County, Nova Scotia was the first to be finished in 1865, followed by Pictou, Digby, Yarmouth, Hants, Kings, and Cumberland counties.

The Map of Lunenburg County was finished in 1864 and includes details of Maders Cove, Mahone Bay, Lunenburg, Chester, Chester Basin, and Bridgewater.
