= Affine plank problem =

Open problem in convex geometry

The relative width of a plank is its width divided by the body's width measured in the same perpendicular direction. Here, the relative width is 2/6 = 1/3.

In mathematics, the affine plank problem is an open question in convex geometry posed by Thøger Bang in 1951 as a strengthening of Tarski's plank problem. It asks whether the sum of the relative widths of any collection of planks covering a convex body must be at least 1. Unlike the original plank problem, which was solved by Bang himself, the affine plank problem remains open in general, although it has been resolved for special cases including centrally symmetric bodies.

The problem is also known as Bang's conjecture, the affine plank conjecture, or the affine-invariant plank problem; sometimes described as a geometric pigeonhole principle.

== Statement ==
A plank in $\mathbb{R}^d$ is the closed region between two parallel hyperplanes. Given a convex body $K \subset \mathbb{R}^d$ (a compact convex set with nonempty interior) and a plank $P$ with unit normal vector $u \in S^{d-1}$, the relative width of $P$ with respect to $K$ is

$$\operatorname{rw}_K(P) = \frac{w(P)}{w_K(u)},$$

where $w(P)$ is the width of the plank (the distance between its bounding hyperplanes) and $w_K(u)$ is the width of $K$ in the direction $u$ (the distance between the two supporting hyperplanes of $K$ perpendicular to $u$).

Conjecture (Bang, 1951)—If planks $P_1, \ldots, P_m$ cover a convex body $K \subset \mathbb{R}^d$, then

$$\sum_{i=1}^m \operatorname{rw}_K(P_i) \geq 1.$$

Since $w_K(u) \geq w(K)$ for every direction $u$, the relative width of any plank is at most its absolute width divided by the minimal width of $K$. Therefore, the affine plank conjecture implies Bang's theorem (the solution to Tarski's plank problem), making it a strictly stronger statement.

A key feature of relative width is its affine invariance: if $T$ is an invertible affine transformation, then the relative width of $T(P)$ with respect to $T(K)$ equals the relative width of $P$ with respect to $K$. This invariance is the reason for the name "affine plank problem".

== Equivalent formulation ==
Alexander (1968) showed that the affine plank conjecture is equivalent to a geometric generalisation of the pigeonhole principle:

Conjecture (equivalent form)—Given a convex body $K$ in $\mathbb{R}^d$ and $n$ hyperplanes, there exists a translate of $\tfrac{1}{n+1}K$ inside $K$ whose interior does not meet any of the hyperplanes.

Ball (1991) described this as a "multi-dimensional pigeon-hole principle". The equivalence connects the affine plank problem to Diophantine approximation via observations of Harold Davenport (1962).

== Known results ==
=== Symmetric bodies ===
The most important partial result is due to Ball (1991), who proved the conjecture for centrally symmetric convex bodies. Ball reformulated the problem in terms of Banach spaces: every centrally symmetric convex body can serve as the unit ball of a finite-dimensional Banach space, and the conjecture becomes the statement that if the unit ball is covered by planks, the sum of their half-widths (relative to the norm) is at least 1. Ball extended this result to infinite-dimensional Banach spaces in the same paper.

Ball's proof reduces the problem to a statement about matrices with 1s on the diagonal, then uses an orthogonal change of basis to symmetrize the matrix so that Bang's lemma can be applied. This approach also yielded a complex plank theorem for Hilbert spaces.

=== Two planks ===
Bang proved the conjecture for the case of two planks in 1953, with alternative proofs later given by Alexander (1968) and Gardner (1988).

The conjecture remains open in the plane: Bang's 1953 result covers only coverings by two planks, not arbitrary coverings in $\mathbb{R}^2$. Even the case of three planks on a triangle is unsettled.

=== Two directions ===
Akopyan, Karasev, and Petrov (2019) proved the conjecture in the case where all planks have one of two normal directions, using techniques from symplectic geometry.

=== Lower bounds ===
For general convex bodies, the best known unconditional lower bounds on the sum of relative widths are:

- $\tfrac{1}{d}$, from combining John's ellipsoid theorem with Bang's theorem;
- $\tfrac{2}{1+d}$, from combining Ball's symmetric-body result with a theorem of Minkowski and Radon;
- $\tfrac{2}{1+\sqrt{d}}$, the current best bound, proved by Bakaev and Yehudayoff (2026).

In the plane ($d = 2$), the Bakaev–Yehudayoff bound gives approximately 0.828. Their proof uses the support function and John's position of the difference body $L = \tfrac{1}{2}(K - K)$, combined with an inequality relating chord length to width for convex bodies inscribed between concentric balls.

=== Reduction to simplices ===
Ambrus (2010) showed that the affine plank conjecture for $d$ planks on all convex bodies in all dimensions reduces to verifying it for the regular $(2d-1)$-simplex. The argument proceeds by choosing, for each plank direction, a pair of points in $K$ that realise the width, then expressing the covering condition in terms of barycentric coordinates on a simplex formed by these points. This reduction means, for example, that proving the conjecture for three planks on the 5-dimensional simplex would imply it for three planks on any convex body in any dimension.

== Related problems ==
- Tarski's plank problem, the predecessor problem proved by Bang (absolute widths)
- The annulus plank problem, asking whether removing a small homothetic copy from the interior changes the minimal total width needed for covering
- The Pyjama problem, on covering the plane by rotated periodic stripes
- The Fejes Tóth zone conjecture, proved by Jiang and Polyanskii in 2017, which states that zones covering the unit sphere have total width at least $\pi$; its proof uses ideas from Bang's lemma
- Conway's fried potato problem, solved by András Bezdek and Károly Bezdek (1995), which is related to the equivalent "pigeonhole" formulation

== Applications ==
Through its connections to Bang's lemma and its equivalent formulations, the affine plank problem and its partial solutions have applications in several areas:

- Diophantine approximation: The equivalent pigeonhole formulation yields results on simultaneous approximation of real numbers, sharpening estimates of Davenport.
- Sphere packings: Ball used his plank theorem to give a lower bound for the density of lattice packings of balls.
- Polynomial zero avoidance: Glazyrin, Karasev, and Polyanskii (2023) developed a polynomial approach that unifies Tarski's plank problem with its complex and spherical variants, showing that a point on the unit ball at distance at least $1/n$ from the zero set of any degree-$n$ polynomial always exists.
