= Bang's theorem =

Bang's theorem may refer to:

- The solution to Tarski's plank problem by Thøger Bang (1917–1997)
- A special case of Zsigmondy's theorem, on unique divisors of Mersenne numbers, by Alfred Sophus Bang (1866–1942)
- Bang's theorem on tetrahedra, posed by Alfred Sophus Bang (1866–1942)
