= Miramichi, Nova Scotia =

Community in Nova Scotia, Canada

Coordinates: 46°2′41.14″N 61°18′59.09″W

Miramichi in Nova Scotia

Miramichi is a small community in the Canadian province of Nova Scotia, located in Inverness County on Cape Breton Island between Brook Village and the Mull River. It took its name from one of the early residents having spent much time in the Miramichi region of New Brunswick. The name "Miramichi" is a Mi'kmaq word.
