= Caproni Ca.87 =

1920s Italian flying boat

Ca.87
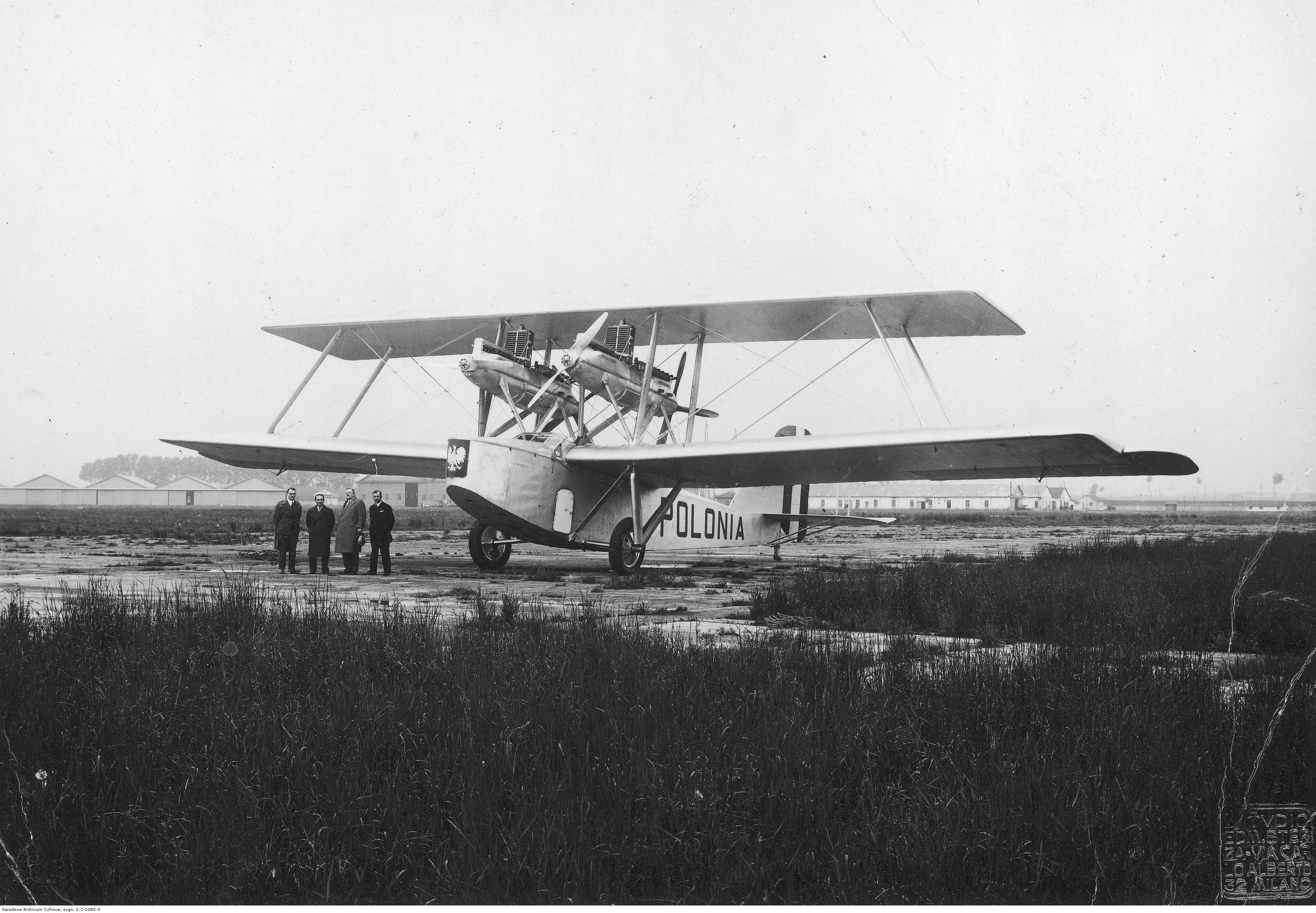

General information
- Type: Long-range record aircraft / bomber
- Manufacturer: Caproni
- Number built: 1

History
- First flight: 15 June 1929

The Caproni Ca.87 was an Italian long-distance aircraft built in the 1920s for a planned transatlantic flight.

== Development ==
In 1927, some Polish Americans conceived the idea of organizing a Polish flight across the Atlantic. Only two years later, Stanley Adamkevich from Chicago was able to organize this enterprise, and $36,000 was collected among Polish Americans. The crew for this task was chosen by the Polish government: the pilot of the 3rd Aviation Regiment, Captain Adam Kowalczyk, and LOT Polish Airlines pilot, Lt. Włodzimierz Klisz.

Different aircraft were taken under consideration, but most were too expensive. Gianni Caproni of Caproni firm personally decided to hand one Caproni Ca.73ter night bomber, on the basis of which they built the Ca.87 record attempt aircraft, participating in costs for advertisement purpose. First of all, the aircraft was altered for a possible landing on the water. Work was moving fast and in early May 1929 the aircraft was ready and flew for the first time on 15 June 1929. The Ca.87 was christened Polonia.

The Ca.87's flight was scheduled for 4 July 1929, on Independence Day. The Ca.87 flew from the Italian Medionali airfield to the Baldonnel airfield in Ireland, waiting for a fair wind. The route was laid to the Canadian airport of Terra Nova, from there they intended to fly to Chicago. However, the new Isotta Fraschini Asso engines worked intermittently, and factory mechanics could not adjust them properly, to guarantee a safe flight on a long distance. Moreover, on 13 July there came news about the crash of another Polish pilot Ludwik Idzikowski during an attempt of a trans-Atlantic flight. As a result, the plans were cancelled. The aircraft was returned to Caproni, where it was converted into a bomber.

== Specifications ==
Data from Aeroplani Caproni, Airwar:Caproni Ca.87

General characteristics

- Crew: 2
- Capacity: 10 pax
- Length: 15.1 m (49 ft 6 in)
- Wingspan: 25 m (82 ft 0 in)
- Wing area: 143 m^{2} (1,540 sq ft)
- Empty weight: 4,500 kg (9,921 lb)
- Gross weight: 10,000 kg (22,046 lb)
- Powerplant: 4 × Isotta Fraschini V.6 six-cylinder, water-cooled, in-line piston engines, 190 kW (250 hp) each
- Propellers: 2-bladed fixed pitch tractor propellers on forward engines

Performance

- Maximum speed: 180 km/h (110 mph, 97 kn)
- Cruise speed: 146 km/h (91 mph, 79 kn)
- Range: 5,000 km (3,100 mi, 2,700 nmi)
- Service ceiling: 4,000 m (13,000 ft)

== See also ==
Related lists

- List of Interwar military aircraft
