= White Hill, Nova Scotia =

Community in Nova Scotia, Canada

Coordinates: 45°29′22.9″N 62°45′22.9″W

White Hill in Nova Scotia

White Hill is a community in the Canadian province of Nova Scotia, located in Pictou County. It was once a rural farming community with a history of Scottish settlement. The population is around 300.

The area was first settled by John Marshall whose family came from Kirkcudbrightshire, Scotland in 1776. Descendants still live in Whitehill. During the early to mid 20th century farmers from the area worked in the forests during the winter to provide the coal mines with pit props in the nearby town of Westville. Today some of the area is still farmed, although most land has now reverted to forest.

A still lived in old homestead, Whitehill, Nova Scotia

Some of the farming buildings and homes in Whitehill date back to the 1870s. The older residents of the area remembered hearing the Halifax Explosion over 100 miles away on that fateful day in 1917.
