= West Caledonia, Nova Scotia =

Community in Nova Scotia, Canada

Coordinates: 44°21′59.21″N 65°6′51.3″W

West Caledonia in Nova Scotia

West Caledonia is a community in the Canadian province of Nova Scotia, located in Queens County.
