= Lime Hill, Nova Scotia =

Community in Nova Scotia, Canada

Coordinates: 45°46′53.94″N 61°6′57.29″W

Lime Hill in Nova Scotia

Lime Hill (Scottish Gaelic: Bràigh na h-Aibhneadh) is a small community in the Canadian province of Nova Scotia, located in Inverness County on Cape Breton Island. The area was formerly known as Dallas Brook, named for the early settler Robert Dallas. Lime Hill had a population of 125 people in 1898.
