= Wellington, Queens, Nova Scotia =

Community in Nova Scotia, Canada

Coordinates: 44°17′52.55″N 64°48′46.13″W

Wellington in Nova Scotia

Wellington is a community in the Canadian province of Nova Scotia, located in the Region of Queens Municipality.
