= Oregon, Nova Scotia =

Community in Nova Scotia, Canada

Coordinates: 46°18′55.86″N 60°38′45.87″W

Oregon in Nova Scotia

Oregon is a small community in the Canadian province of Nova Scotia, located in Victoria County on Cape Breton Island.
