= Sandford, Nova Scotia =

Community in Nova Scotia, Canada

Coordinates: 43°55′15″N 66°08′51″W

Sandford in Nova Scotia

Sandford is a small community in the Canadian province of Nova Scotia, located in Yarmouth County.

The Mi'kmaq likely referred to the area as "Kespoogwit", meaning "land's end". The name "Sandford" may be descriptive, referring to a nearby sandy ford.
