= Woodstock, Nova Scotia =

Community in Nova Scotia, Canada

Coordinates: 44°0′54.59″N 66°5′25.14″W

Woodstock in Nova Scotia

Woodstock is a community in the Canadian province of Nova Scotia, located in Yarmouth County. It may be named after Woodstock, Oxfordshire, in England.
