= South West Port Mouton, Nova Scotia =

Community in Nova Scotia, Canada

Coordinates: 43°53′55.97″N 64°48′59.1″W

South West Port Mouton in Nova Scotia

South West Port Mouton is a community in the Canadian province of Nova Scotia, located in the Region of Queens Municipality.
