= Mount Pleasant, Queens, Nova Scotia =

Community in Nova Scotia, Canada

Coordinates: 44°1′59.91″N 64°42′9.38″W

Mount Pleasant in Nova Scotia

Mount Pleasant is a community in the Canadian province of Nova Scotia, located in the Region of Queens Municipality
