= Harmony Mills, Nova Scotia =

Community in Nova Scotia, Canada

Coordinates: 44°23′19.16″N 65°4′39.05″W

Harmony Mills in Nova Scotia

Harmony Mills is a community in the Canadian province of Nova Scotia, located in the Region of Queens Municipality.
