= Riversdale, Region of Queens Municipality =

Community in Nova Scotia, Canada

Coordinates: 44°10′55.05″N 64°41′13.15″W

Riversdale in Nova Scotia

Riversdale is a community in the Canadian province of Nova Scotia, located in the Region of Queens Municipality.
