= Brookfield Mines, Nova Scotia =

Community in Nova Scotia, Canada

Coordinates: 44°24′49.12″N 64°55′15.92″W

Brookfield Mines in Nova Scotia

Brookfield Mines is a community in the Canadian province of Nova Scotia, located in the Region of Queens Municipality.
