= Norwood, Nova Scotia =

Community in Nova Scotia, Canada

Coordinates: 44°4′1.16″N 66°1′10.53″W

Norwood in Nova Scotia

Norwood is a community in the Canadian province of Nova Scotia, located in Yarmouth County. Its name is likely short for "North Woods", on account of its location north of the town of Yarmouth.
