= Middle LaHave, Nova Scotia =

Community in Nova Scotia, Canada

Middle LaHave
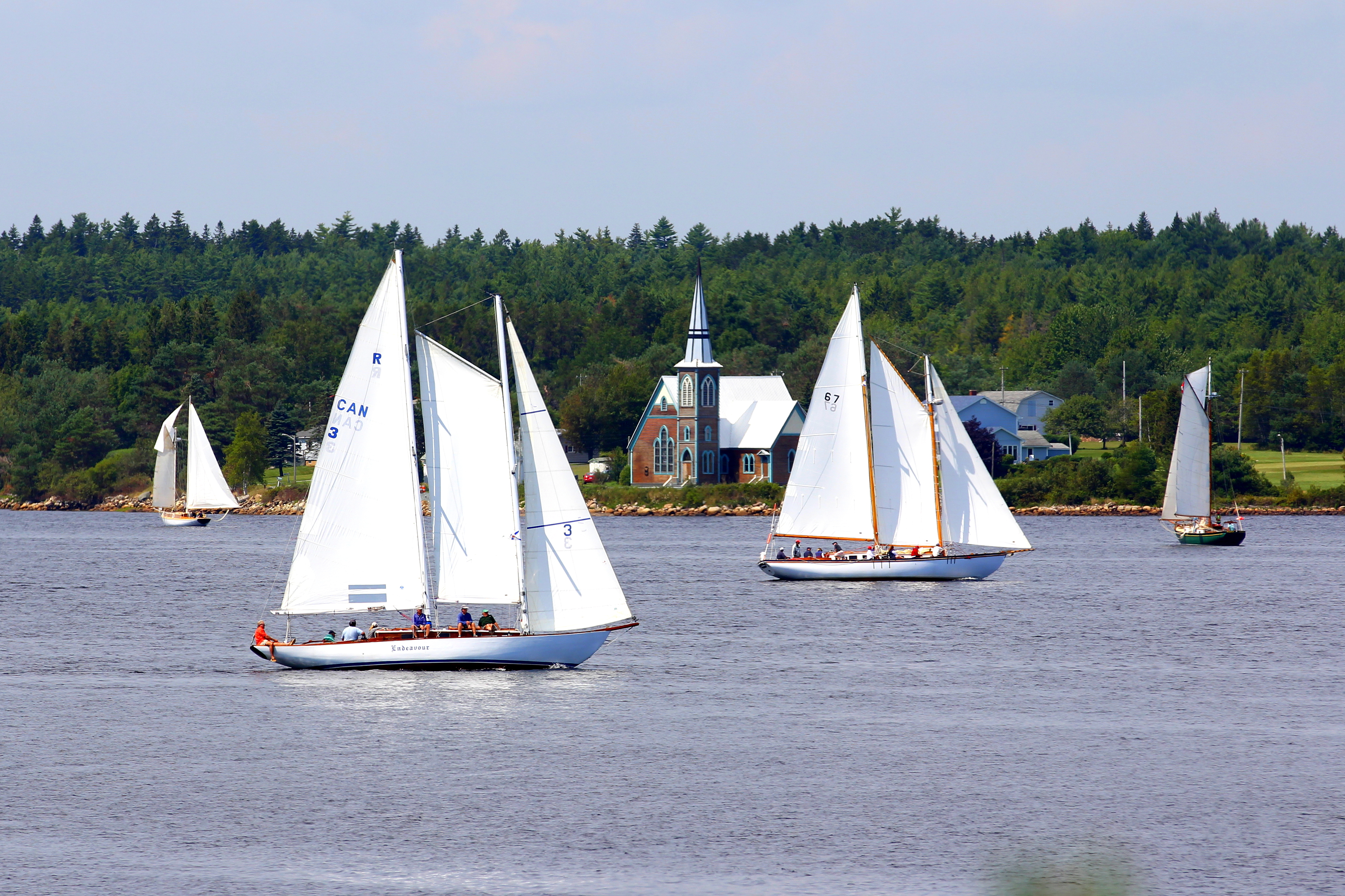
- St. Mark's Place behind the 2014 Nova Scotia Schooner Association Race Week course

- Location within Nova Scotia
- Coordinates: 44°19′16.4″N 64°24′29.5″W
- Country: Canada
- Province: Nova Scotia
- Municipality: Lunenburg Municipality
- Elevation: 0 m (0 ft)
- Highest elevation: 119 m (390 ft)
- Lowest elevation: 0 m (0 ft)
- Time zone: UTC-4 (AST)
  - Summer (DST): UTC-3 (ADT)
- Canadian Postal code: B0J 2W0, B4V 2Y4
- Area code: 902
- Telephone Exchanges: 764, 766, 543, 527
- NTS Map: 021A08
- GNBC Code: CAZDY
- Website: www.modl.ca

Middle LaHave is a small community in the Canadian province of Nova Scotia. The community is located in the Lunenburg Municipal District in Lunenburg County.

Middle LaHave features the narrowest and widest parts of the LaHave River. Which, in the past, made Middle LaHave a major community along the river. The community draws electricity from both the Riverport Electric Light Commission as well as NS Power and also shares both Riverport and Bridgewater telephone exchanges. It has a diverse terrain from low-lying areas to the rolling hills of the Bear Hills area. There are two churches serving the community, being Anglican and United. The third church was closed in 2005, later sold and renovated and officially reopened in 2011 as St. Mark's Place, a privately owned entertainment facility available for community use.

== History ==
Samuel de Champlain struck settlement claims along the banks of both the North and South shores of the river, including Middle LaHave. Traditionally the Northern side of the LaHave is predominantly on the Lighthouse Route, offering a diverse culture, with both French and English backgrounds. Following the colonization by British and French settlers, German families also immigrated to the South Shore, founding Lunenburg in 1753.

== Culture ==
Their culture and traditions are apparent in the area from the dialect to the architecture. Middle LaHave has a wide variety of inhabitants, including traditional and local families such as Crouse, Corkum, Schmeisser, Lohnes and Mosher. The culture of the LaHave and its founding fathers continues to spread throughout Nova Scotia.
