= Maders Cove =

Community in Nova Scotia, Canada

Coordinates: 44°26′5.14″N 64°21′14.26″W

Maders Cove in Nova Scotia

Maders Cove is a community in the Canadian province of Nova Scotia, located in Lunenburg County. Founded by Swiss and German settlers in the late 18th century, the area, which includes Westhaver Beach, has a rich history of farming and fishing.

== History ==
Before the British settlements, there was a small French settlement at Maders Cove and even earlier there were First Nations encampments. British-sponsored founders of the cove were of German/Swiss descent.

On Ambrose Finson Church's 1883 map of the area, surnames in the area included Mader, Strum, Smeltzer, Deal, Westhaver, Eisenhauer, Crooks, Roast, Ernst, Hyson, Loy, Zwicker, Wynook, Slaunwhite, Hebb, Ham, and Pickels. Most of these surnames were still there in the 1931 Canadian Census: Mader, Strum, Knock, Ernst, Westhaver, Hyson, Deal, Smeltzer, Nauss, Hubley, Langille, Knicle, Sawlor, Rost, Eisner, Joudrey, Schwartz, Whynot, Slauenwhite, and Hamm.

Most of the families were farmers with a few fishermen. Many were machinists or carpenters who worked at the Strum Door and Sash manufacturing plant (Maritime Manufacturing and Construction Company) in the Cove until it burnt down in the 1970s.

According to information found at the Mahone Bay Founder's Museum, George “Bernard” Mader (Meeder) (1747-1797) was one of the original land grantees in Maders Cove. He came with his father from the Palatinate area of Germany at 4 years of age in 1752 on The Gale. Bernard received a township land grant of 65 acres in Mader’s Cove on June 30, 1784. The Cove was likely named after him.

Phillip Smeltzer (Schmeltzer) (1729-1814) also came aboard the Gale in 1752 and his family was also one of the original grantees of Maders Cove. It is likely that "Smelt Cove" was named after the Smeltzers, not the fish.

== Geography ==
The current area is mostly along the Maders Cove Road along the waters of Mahone Bay and includes Westhaver Beach. It is bounded on the west by the old railway, now part of the Bay to Bay Trail, that runs along the old number 3 Highway.

Maders Cove is a census area and is recognized for Nova Scotia property assessments. Residents use the Mahone Bay postal code B0J 2E0. Along Maders Cove Road, the area includes Kinburn Acres, a 1967 subdivision, Ringer Road, Whitetail Lane, Westhaver Road, Langille Road, Cove Road, and a bit of Herman's Island Road, along the Number Three Highway, from the border with the Town of Mahone Bay to Martin's Brook, it includes Great Ridge Road, Orchard Heights Road (a 1970s subdivision), Masons Road, Whynot's Road, Tanner Road, and part of Smeltzer's Road.

In the 2024 provincial assessment rolls, Maders Cove had approximately 162 sites with a building on it.

== Westhaver Beach ==
Westhaver Beach is located along Maders Cove Road and in 1992 was formally designated as a beach under subsection 5(1) of the Nova Scotia Beaches Act. Westhaver Island has had a lighthouse since 1882. Although it has had many iterations over the years and is no longer staffed, the newest one was installed in 2022.

Keepers through the years were:

- Edward Strum (1882 – 1885)
- J. Peter Strum (1885 – 1888)
- James Alfred Strum (1888 – 1916)
- D. Slaunwhite (1916)
- J.S. Weinant (1916)
- James Joudrey (1916 – 1921).

According to the Mahone Bay Museum, the Strums were loyalists and came to Maders Cove in about 1774.
