= Low Landing, Nova Scotia =

Community in Nova Scotia, Canada

Coordinates: 44°16′02.4″N 65°08′34″W

Low Landing in Nova Scotia

Low Landing is a community in the Canadian province of Nova Scotia, located in the Region of Queens Municipality.

Low Landing is on the northern shore of Lake Rossignol. This was, at one time, a summer community where residents of Caledonia, Nova Scotia and other nearby areas would go for the hot summer months. However, when the lake was raised in 1929, the summer community was submerged and usage of the area was abandoned.
