= Eagle Head, Nova Scotia =

Community in Nova Scotia, Canada

Coordinates: 44°4′18.04″N 64°36′18.99″W

Eagle Head in Nova Scotia

Eagle Head is a community in the Canadian province of Nova Scotia, located in the Region of Queens Municipality.
