= Whiteburn Mines =

Community in Nova Scotia, Canada

Coordinates: 44°19′34.25″N 65°3′34.16″W

Whiteburn Mines in Nova Scotia

Whiteburn Mines is a community in the Canadian province of Nova Scotia, located in the Region of Queens Municipality.
