= Abbotts Dyke, Nova Scotia =

Coordinates: 43.819°N 65.866°W

Location of Abbots Dyke in Nova Scotia

Abbotts Dyke is a dyke located in Argyle Head, Nova Scotia.

It carries the Crowelltown Road across an inlet of the Argyle River estuary.
