= Summerville Beach, Nova Scotia =

Community in Nova Scotia, Canada

Coordinates: 43°57′3″N 64°49′13″W

Summerville Beach in Nova Scotia

Summerville Beach is a community in the Canadian province of Nova Scotia, located in the Region of Queens Municipality.
