= Gardners Mills, Nova Scotia =

Community in Nova Scotia, Canada

Coordinates: 44°1′6.59″N 65°58′45.31″W

Gardners Mills in Nova Scotia

Gardners Mills is a community in the Canadian province of Nova Scotia, located in Yarmouth County.
