= Melbourne, Nova Scotia =

Community in Nova Scotia, Canada

Coordinates: 43°47′2.34″N 66°3′18.92″W

Melbourne in Nova Scotia

Melbourne is a community in the Canadian province of Nova Scotia, located in Yarmouth County.

The Mi'kmaq may have referred to the area as "Keskoospaak", which means "where they catch beavers". The area was settled by Europeans in the late 18th century, who called the area "Little River". It was likely named in honour of Lord Melbourne.
