= Lower Clyde River, Nova Scotia =

Community in Nova Scotia, Canada

Coordinates: 43.721°N 65.528°W

Location of Lower Clyde River, Nova Scotia in Nova Scotia

Lower Clyde River is a community in the Shelburne County, Nova Scotia, Canada.
