= Queensville, Nova Scotia =

Community in Nova Scotia, Canada

Coordinates: 45°43′30.42″N 61°21′26.79″W

Queensville in Nova Scotia

Queensville is a small community in the Canadian province of Nova Scotia, located in Inverness County on Cape Breton Island.

== History ==
Queensville was settled in the early 1800s, and is likely named in honour of Queen Victoria.
