= Molega, Nova Scotia =

Community in Nova Scotia, Canada

Coordinates: 44°19′57.68″N 64°53′56.35″W

Molega in Nova Scotia

Molega is a community in the Canadian province of Nova Scotia, located in the Region of Queens Municipality.
