= Ardness =

Community in Nova Scotia, Canada

Coordinates: 45°41′46″N 62°14′7″W

Ardness is an unincorporated community in the Canadian province of Nova Scotia, located in Pictou County. The community is situated roughly 3 kilometres south of the Northumberland Strait.

The name, in a Scottish settlement, suggests Aird, a town in the Isle of Skye, from which some of the settlers came; and "Ness," akin to nose, a point of land running into the sea. It is an inland village, but nevertheless it is believed that this is how the name was constructed. The prefix "Ard" is found in a number of place names of Scotland.

A school opened in Ardness on 5 February 1920. The community had a population of 70 people in 1956.
