= Medway, Nova Scotia =

Community in Nova Scotia, Canada

Coordinates: 44°7′53.27″N 64°37′39.94″W

Port Medway in Nova Scotia

Port Medway is a community in the Canadian province of Nova Scotia, located in the Region of Queens Municipality.
