= Creignish =

Community in Nova Scotia, Canada

Coordinates: 45°43′47.24″N 61°27′32.01″W

Creignish in Nova Scotia

Creignish is a community in the Canadian province of Nova Scotia, located in Inverness County on Cape Breton Island near the mouth of the Strait of Canso. Its name means "rocky place" and is named after Craignish, Argyll, Scotland.

Creignish is the setting of Linden MacIntyre's award-winning novel The Bishop's Man.
