= Sandy Cove, Halifax, Nova Scotia =

Locality in Nova Scotia, Canada

Coordinates: 44°28′13.07″N 63°33′32.7″W

Sandy Cove in Nova Scotia

Sandy Cove is a locality of the Halifax Regional Municipality in the Canadian province of Nova Scotia on the Chebucto Peninsula.

== Climate ==
Climate data for Sandy Cove (1981–2010)
Month	Jan	Feb	Mar	Apr	May	Jun	Jul	Aug	Sep	Oct	Nov	Dec	Year
Record high °C (°F)	12.5 (54.5)	10.6 (51.1)	15.6 (60.1)	25.0 (77.0)	25.5 (77.9)	30.0 (86.0)	29.0 (84.2)	33.0 (91.4)	28.0 (82.4)	21.5 (70.7)	18.0 (64.4)	12.8 (55.0)	33.0 (91.4)
Mean daily maximum °C (°F)	0.4 (32.7)	0.5 (32.9)	2.9 (37.2)	7.0 (44.6)	11.2 (52.2)	16.0 (60.8)	19.2 (66.6)	20.4 (68.7)	18.1 (64.6)	13.2 (55.8)	8.4 (47.1)	3.1 (37.6)	10.0 (50.0)
Daily mean °C (°F)	−3.9 (25.0)	−3.6 (25.5)	−0.7 (30.7)	3.5 (38.3)	7.6 (45.7)	12.3 (54.1)	15.6 (60.1)	16.7 (62.1)	14.3 (57.7)	9.4 (48.9)	4.7 (40.5)	−1.0 (30.2)	6.2 (43.2)
Mean daily minimum °C (°F)	−8.1 (17.4)	−7.6 (18.3)	−4.3 (24.3)	−0.1 (31.8)	3.8 (38.8)	8.4 (47.1)	11.7 (53.1)	12.9 (55.2)	10.3 (50.5)	5.5 (41.9)	1.0 (33.8)	−5.1 (22.8)	2.4 (36.3)
Record low °C (°F)	−26.5 (−15.7)	−23.0 (−9.4)	−20.5 (−4.9)	−11.0 (12.2)	−5.6 (21.9)	1.0 (33.8)	5.0 (41.0)	4.0 (39.2)	−2.0 (28.4)	−6.1 (21.0)	−11.1 (12.0)	−25.0 (−13.0)	−26.5 (−15.7)
Average precipitation mm (inches)	118.1 (4.65)	103.6 (4.08)	115.2 (4.54)	117.7 (4.63)	115.1 (4.53)	115.1 (4.53)	110.5 (4.35)	97.8 (3.85)	107.0 (4.21)	117.1 (4.61)	132.3 (5.21)	134.7 (5.30)	1,384 (54.49)
Average rainfall mm (inches)	85.2 (3.35)	74.2 (2.92)	91.9 (3.62)	112.6 (4.43)	114.6 (4.51)	115.1 (4.53)	110.5 (4.35)	97.8 (3.85)	107.0 (4.21)	117.0 (4.61)	126.9 (5.00)	117.2 (4.61)	1,269.9 (50.00)
Average snowfall cm (inches)	32.9 (13.0)	29.4 (11.6)	23.3 (9.2)	5.1 (2.0)	0.5 (0.2)	0.0 (0.0)	0.0 (0.0)	0.0 (0.0)	0.0 (0.0)	0.1 (0.0)	5.4 (2.1)	17.5 (6.9)	114.2 (45.0)
Average precipitation days (≥ 0.2 mm)	13.4	11.0	13.5	15.4	17.2	15.3	13.9	14.2	13.2	14.1	15.6	13.8	170.5
Average rainy days (≥ 0.2 mm)	9.1	7.1	10.4	15.0	17.2	15.3	13.9	14.2	13.2	14.1	14.9	11.7	156.0
Average snowy days (≥ 0.2 cm)	5.7	5.0	4.3	1.2	0.15	0.0	0.0	0.0	0.0	0.05	1.1	3.3	20.8
Mean monthly sunshine hours	101.9	111.9	132.3	134.2	166.8	181.7	202.6	190.0	181.6	145.1	98.7	89.9	1,736.5
Percentage possible sunshine	35.5	38.3	35.9	33.3	36.4	39.1	43.1	43.7	48.2	42.5	34.1	32.5	38.6
Source: Environment Canada
