= Tarski's plank problem =

Mathematical problem

In mathematics, Tarski's plank problem is a question about coverings of convex regions in n-dimensional Euclidean space by "planks": regions between two hyperplanes. Alfred Tarski asked if the sum of the widths of the planks must be at least the minimum width of the convex region. The question was answered affirmatively by Thøger Bang (1950, 1951).

== Statement ==

Given a convex body C in R^{n} and a hyperplane H, the width of C parallel to H, w(C,H), is the distance between the two supporting hyperplanes of C that are parallel to H. The smallest such distance (i.e. the infimum over all possible hyperplanes) is called the minimal width of C, w(C).

The (closed) set of points P between two distinct, parallel hyperplanes in R^{n} is called a plank, and the distance between the two hyperplanes is called the width of the plank, w(P). Tarski conjectured that if a convex body C of minimal width w(C) was covered by a collection of planks, then the sum of the widths of those planks must be at least w(C). That is, if P_{1},…,P_{m} are planks such that

$$C\subseteq P_1\cup\ldots\cup P_m\subset \R^n,$$

then

$$\sum_{i=1}^m w(P_i)\geq w(C).$$

Bang proved this is indeed the case.

== Nomenclature ==
The name of the problem, specifically for the sets of points between parallel hyperplanes, comes from the visualisation of the problem in R^{2}. Here, hyperplanes are just straight lines and so planks become the space between two parallel lines. Thus the planks can be thought of as (infinitely long) planks of wood, and the question becomes how many planks does one need to completely cover a convex tabletop of minimal width w? Bang's theorem shows that, for example, a circular table of diameter d feet can't be covered by fewer than d planks of wood of width one foot each.

== See also ==
- Affine plank problem, on covering a constant body by planks of small total relative width
- Pyjama problem, on covering the entire plane by periodically spaced planks
