= North Brookfield, Nova Scotia =

Community in Nova Scotia, Canada

Coordinates: 44°23′47.42″N 64°57′27.7″W

North Brookfield in Nova Scotia

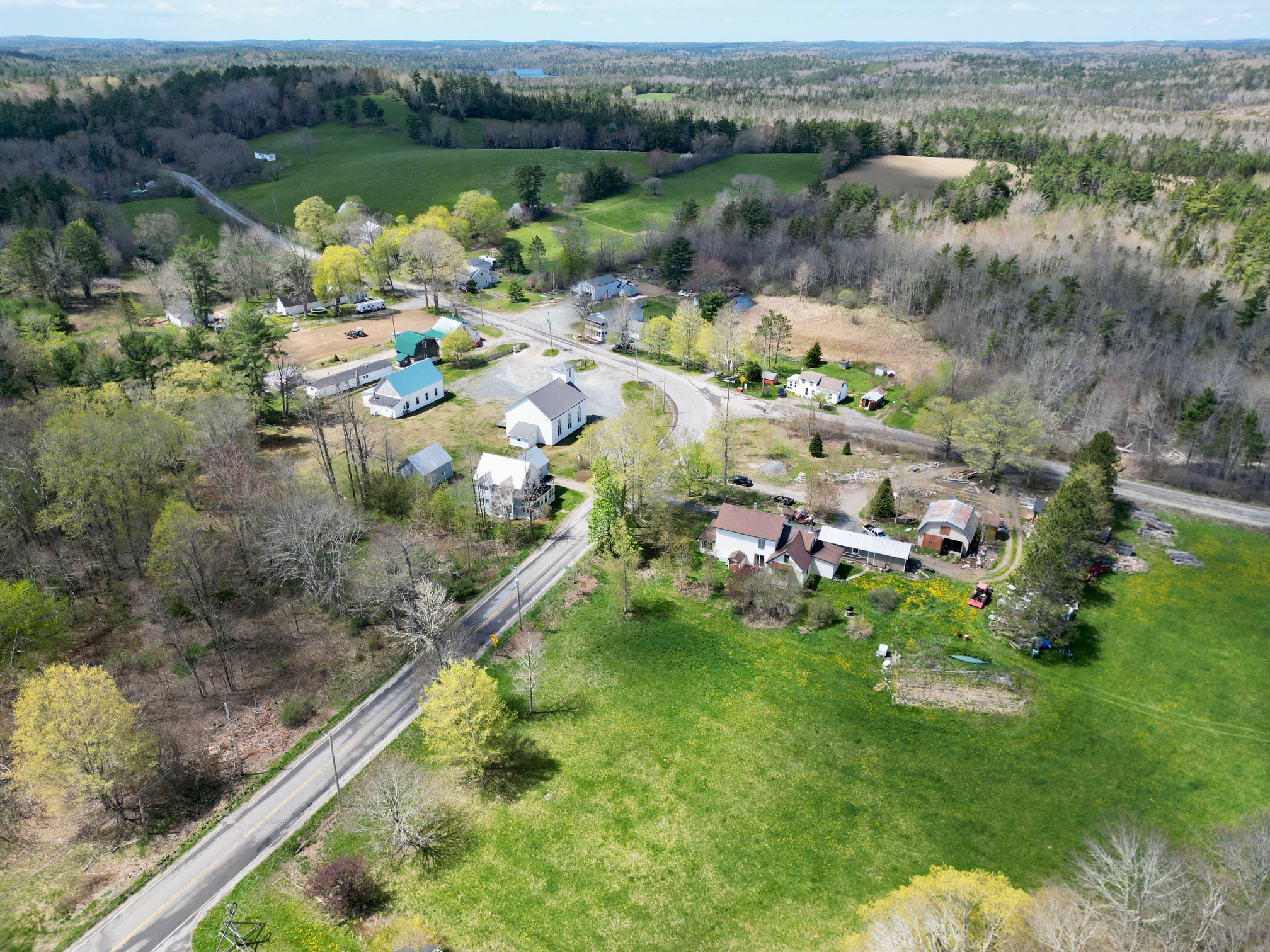
The community of North Brookfield.

North Brookfield is a community in the Canadian province of Nova Scotia, located in the Region of Queens Municipality.
