= Terra Nova, Nova Scotia =

Locality in Nova Scotia, Canada

Coordinates: 45°51′4.62″N 60°31′41.01″W

Terra Nova in Nova Scotia

Terra Nova is a locality in the Canadian province of Nova Scotia, located in the Cape Breton Regional Municipality on Cape Breton Island.
