= Brook Village, Nova Scotia =

Community in Nova Scotia, Canada

Brook Village
- Location within Nova Scotia
- Coordinates: 46°3′3″N 61°18′0″W
- Country: Canada
- Province: Nova Scotia
- Municipality: Inverness County
- Elevation: 48 m (157 ft)
- Time zone: UTC-4 (AST)
  - Summer (DST): UTC-3 (ADT)
- Canadian Postal Code: B0E 3M0
- Area code: 902
- Telephone Exchange: 945

Brook Village (Scottish Gaelic: Baile Beag na h-Aibhne) is a community in the Canadian province of Nova Scotia, located southeast of Mabou in Inverness County. Among the early settlers of Brook Village were Philip and John Doyle, who received a land grant in Brook Village in 1836.

In 1956, Brook Village had a population of 133 people.
