= East Port l'Hébert, Nova Scotia =

Community in Nova Scotia, Canada

Coordinates: 43°48′49.39″N 64°55′12.98″W

East Port l'Hébert in Nova Scotia

East Port l'Hébert (formerly East Side Port l'Hébert) is a community in the Canadian province of Nova Scotia, located in the Region of Queens Municipality.
