= Summerville Centre, Nova Scotia =

Community in Nova Scotia, Canada

Coordinates: 43°57′16″N 64°48′51″W

Summerville Centre in Nova Scotia

Summerville Centre is a community in the Canadian province of Nova Scotia, located in the Region of Queens Municipality.
