= Rocky Bay, Nova Scotia =

Community in Nova Scotia, Canada

Coordinates: 45°33′30.29″N 60°56′57.23″W

Rocky Bay in Nova Scotia

Rocky Bay is a small community in the Canadian province of Nova Scotia, located on Isle Madame in Richmond County.
