= Passchendaele, Nova Scotia =

Community in Nova Scotia, Canada

Coordinates: 46°10′53.38″N 59°57′47.55″W

Passchendaele in Nova Scotia

Passchendaele is a community that is part of the former town of Glace Bay in the Canadian province of Nova Scotia, located in the Cape Breton Regional Municipality on Cape Breton Island .
