= East Berlin, Nova Scotia =

Community in Nova Scotia, Canada

Coordinates: 44°4′26″N 64°33′48″W

East Berlin in Nova Scotia

East Berlin is a community in the Canadian province of Nova Scotia, located in the Region of Queens Municipality.

== See also ==
- West Berlin, Nova Scotia
