= West Berlin, Nova Scotia =

Community in Nova Scotia, Canada

Coordinates: 44°4′2″N 64°34′59″W

West Berlin in Nova Scotia

West Berlin is a community in the Canadian province of Nova Scotia, located in the Region of Queens Municipality.

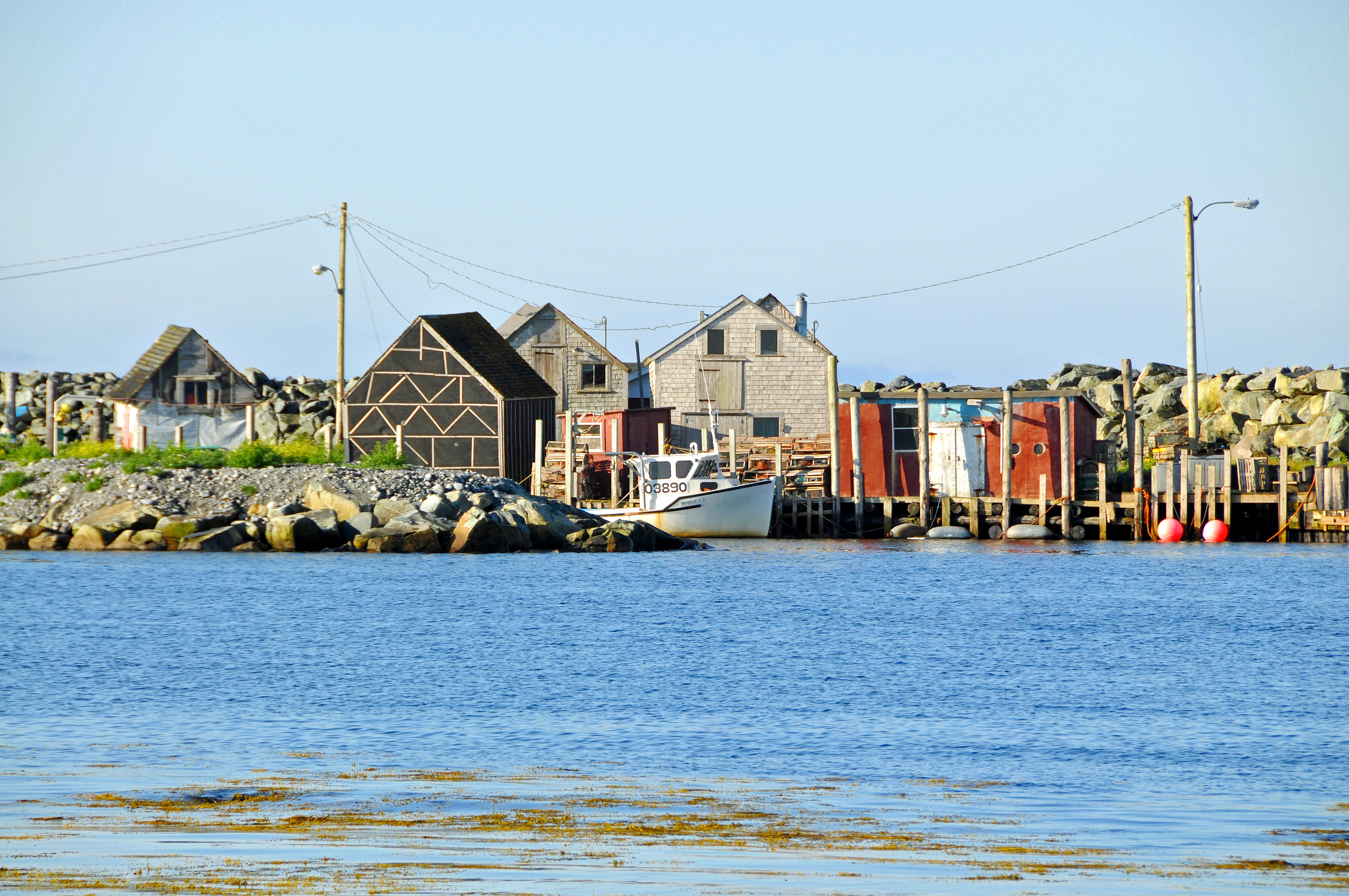

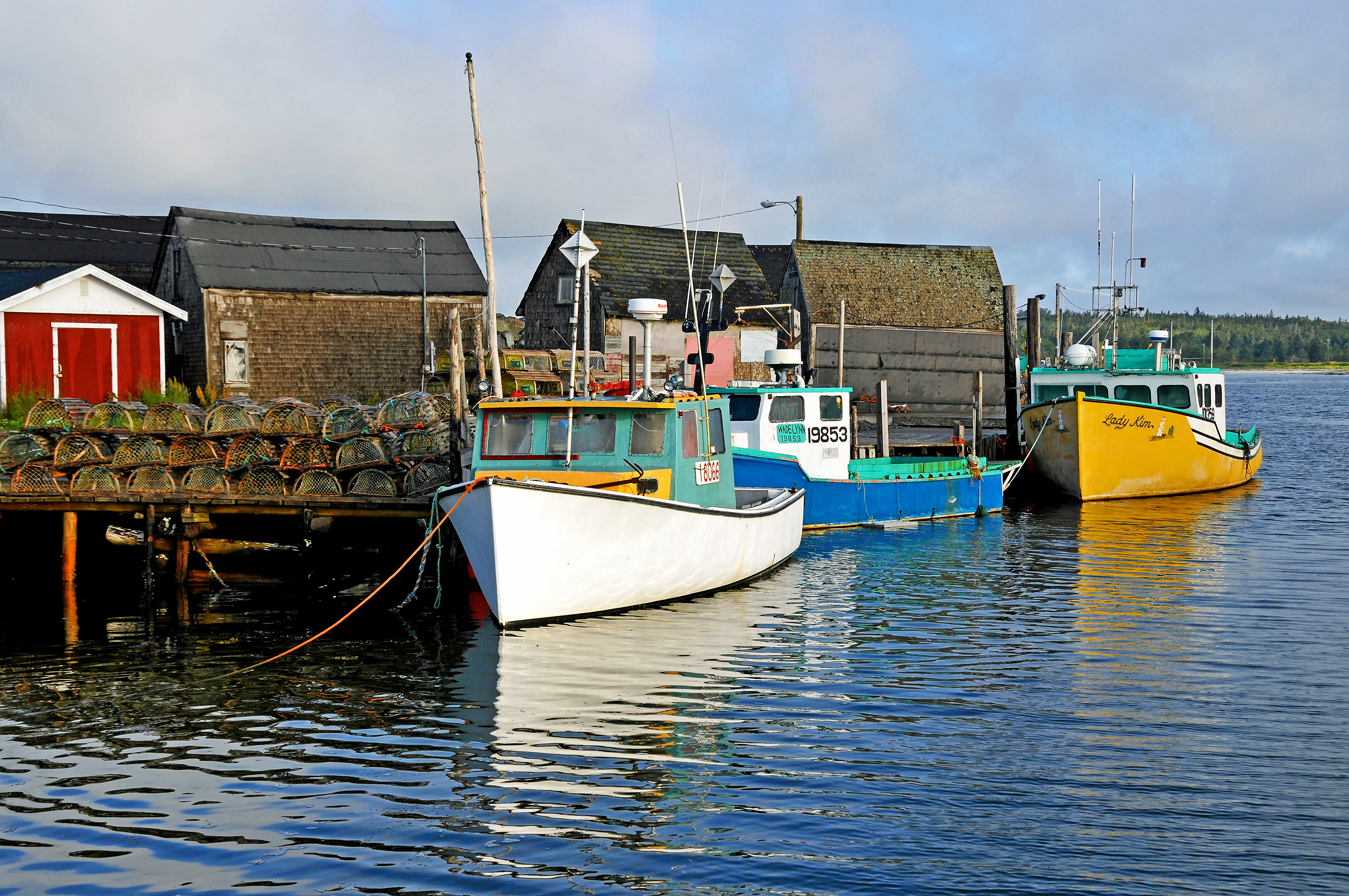

== See also ==
- East Berlin, Nova Scotia
