= Sandy Cove, Queens, Nova Scotia =

Locality in Nova Scotia, Canada

Coordinates: 44°3′8.1″N 64°42′21.43″W

Sandy Cove in Nova Scotia

Sandy Cove is a locality in the Canadian province of Nova Scotia, located in the Region of Queens Municipality.
