= Bangs Falls, Nova Scotia =

Community in Nova Scotia, Canada

Coordinates: 44°14′52.01″N 64°49′57.81″W

Bangs Falls in Nova Scotia

Bangs Falls is a community in the Canadian province of Nova Scotia, located in the Region of Queens Municipality.
