= List of communities in Yarmouth County, Nova Scotia =

Community list in Nova Scotia

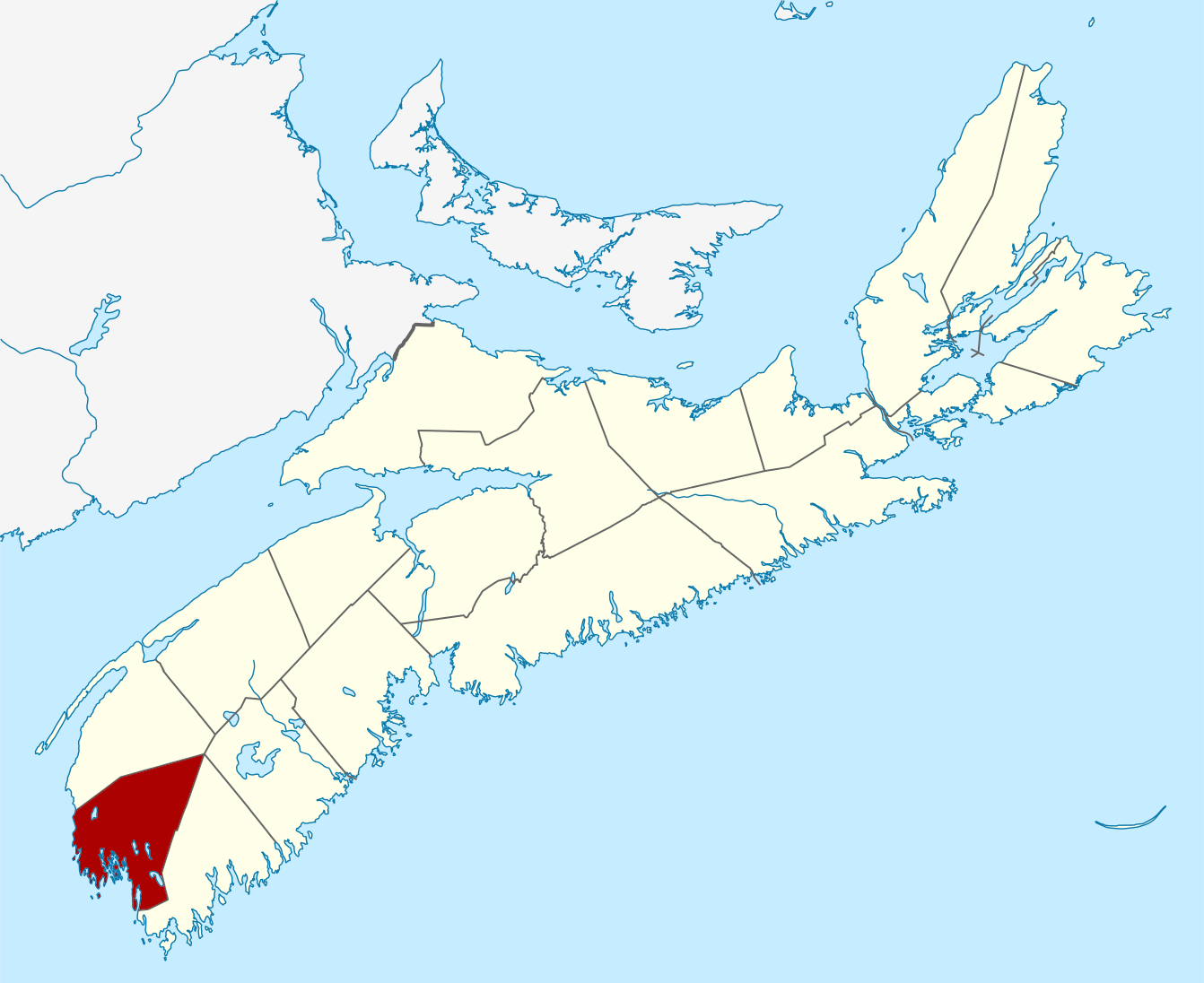
Location of Yarmouth County within Nova Scotia

Communities in Nova Scotia are ordered by the road upon which they are located, whose routes start after each terminus near the largest community.

== Trunk routes ==
- Trunk 1: Yarmouth - Lake Milo - Dayton - Hebron - Wellington - Darling's Lake - Port Maitland
- Trunk 3: Yarmouth - Yarmouth 33 - Arcadia - Pleasant Lake - Tusket - Ste. Anne du Ruisseau - Lower Eel Brook - Glenwood - Argyle - Central Argyle - Lower Argyle - Pubnico - East Pubnico - Middle East Pubnico - Centre East Pubnico - Lower East Pubnico

== Collector roads ==
- Route 203: Carleton - Kemptville - East Kemptville
- Route 304: Yarmouth - Milton Highlands - Overton - Yarmouth Bar - John's Cove - Cape Forchu
- Route 308: Morris Island - Surette's Island - Sluice Point - Amiraults Hill - Hubbard's Point - Tusket - Belleville - North Belleville - Bell Neck - Springhaven - Quinan - East Quinan
- Route 334: Arcadia - Plymouth - Upper Wedgeport - Wedgeport - Lower Wedgeport
- Route 335: Pubnico - West Pubnico - Middle West Pubnico - Lower West Pubnico
- Route 340: Yarmouth - Dayton - Hebron - South Ohio - Deerfield - Pleasant Valley - Carleton - Forest Glen

== Rural roads ==
- Abbots Dyke
- Alder Plains
- Argyle Sound
- Argyle Station
- Black Georges Savannah
- Brazil Lake
- Brenton
- Brooklyn
- Canaan
- Chebogue
- Chebogue Point
- Chegoggin
- Comeau's Hill
- Gavelton
- Gardner's Mill
- Greenville
- Ireton
- Kelleys Cove
- Lake Annis
- Lake George
- Little River Harbour
- Lower West Pubnico
- Melbourne
- Middle West Pubnico
- North Kemptville
- Norwood
- Overton
- Pembroke
- Pinkney's Point
- Raynardton
- Robert's Island
- Rockville
- Sand Beach
- Sandford
- Seal Island
- Short Beach
- South Belleville
- South Canaan
- Springhaven
- Summerville
- Tusket Falls
- Tusket Islands
- Upper West Pubnico
- West Pubnico
- Woodstock
