= List of historic places in Yarmouth County, Nova Scotia =

Yarmouth County is a rural county in the Canadian province of Nova Scotia. This list compiles historic places recognized by the Canadian Register of Historic Places within the county.

== List of historic places ==
Name	Address	Coordinates	Government recognition (CRHP №)	Wikidata ID	Image
African Bethel Cemetery	Greenville Road; Pleasant Lake and Greenville NS	43°51′13″N 66°01′05″W	Pleasant Lake and Greenville municipality (9064)	Q137823023	Upload Photo
Argyle Historic Church and Cemetery	19 Argyle Head Road; Argyle NS	43°47′47″N 65°51′26″W	Nova Scotia (7696), Argyle municipality (15108)	Q137823054	Upload Photo
Argyle Township Court House Archives	8168 Highway 3 Tusket NS	43°51′16″N 65°58′27″W	Tusket municipality (15163)	Q137823116	Upload Photo
Argyle Township Court House and Jail National Historic Site of Canada	8168 Highway 3 Tusket NS	43°34′25″N 65°46′04″W	Federal (11952), Nova Scotia (5753), Tusket municipality (15162)	Q3361033	More images
At the Sign of the Whale	543 No 1 Hwy; Dayton NS	43°52′38″N 66°05′50″W	Nova Scotia (3500), Dayton municipality (5203)	Q137162487	Upload Photo
J. W. Bingay / Dr. Morton House	39 Cliff Street; Yarmouth NS	43°50′03″N 66°07′06″W	Yarmouth municipality (6959)	Q137823239	Upload Photo
Thomas V. B. Bingay House	22 Forest Street; Yarmouth NS	43°50′00″N 66°07′07″W	Yarmouth municipality (4590)	Q137823256	More images
Burgess Blackadar House	24 Prescott Street; Yarmouth NS	43°50′36″N 66°06′51″W	Yarmouth municipality (6403)	Q137823270	Upload Photo
Brenton Methodist Church	473 Brenton Road; Brenton NS	43°57′52″N 66°03′07″W	Brenton municipality (9065)	Q137823283	Upload Photo
John Brown House	4 Market Street; Yarmouth NS	43°51′03″N 66°06′58″W	Yarmouth municipality (6404)	Q137823346	Upload Photo
Stayley Brown House	12 Vancouver Street; Yarmouth NS	43°51′05″N 66°07′00″W	Yarmouth municipality (4919)	Q137823362	Upload Photo
Calvinist Baptist Cemetery	Highway 1 Port Maitland NS	43°59′39″N 66°08′46″W	Port Maitland municipality (9269)	Q137823427	Upload Photo
Augustus Cann Estate	31 Carleton Street; Yarmouth NS	43°50′11″N 66°06′55″W	Nova Scotia (7670)	Q137823447	Upload Photo
Cape Forchu Lightstation	1856 No. 304 Highway; Cape Forchu NS	43°47′38″N 66°09′19″W	Nova Scotia (6543), Cape Forchu municipality (5205)	Q5034808	More images
Capt. Charles Carty House	62 Prospect Street; Dayton NS	43°51′27″N 66°06′21″W	Dayton municipality (5161)	Q137823591	Upload Photo
Central Chebogue United Baptist Church	796 Chebogue Road; Central Chebogue NS	43°47′25″N 66°05′20″W	Central Chebogue municipality (9210)	Q137823622	Upload Photo
Chebogue Cemetery	Town Point Road; Rockville NS	43°45′13″N 66°06′00″W	Rockville municipality (9097)	Q60790886	Upload Photo
Chebogue Meeting House	7 Town Point Road; Rockville NS	43°46′43″N 66°06′05″W	Rockville municipality (5170)	Q137823694	Upload Photo
Churchill Mansion	44 Old Post Road; Darlings Lake NS	43°57′32″N 66°08′03″W	Darlings Lake municipality (5213)	Q137823897	Upload Photo
Zaccheus Churchill House	47 Old Post Road; Darlings Lake NS	43°57′28″N 66°08′13″W	Darlings Lake municipality (9273)	Q137823948	Upload Photo
George W. Clements House	58 Prince Street; Yarmouth NS	43°49′55″N 66°07′07″W	Yarmouth municipality (6922)	Q137823953	Upload Photo
Collins Heritage Conservation District	Collins and nearby streets Yarmouth NS	43°50′10″N 66°06′57″W	Yarmouth municipality (4228)	Q137823963	Upload Photo
Ebenezer Corning, Jr. House	405 Pleasant Street; Yarmouth NS	43°51′23″N 66°06′04″W	Nova Scotia (6650), Yarmouth municipality (4955)	Q137823978	Upload Photo
Nehemiah D. Crocker House	1123 Highway 334; Plymouth NS	43°48′00″N 66°00′43″W	Plymouth municipality (15317)	Q137824003	Upload Photo
Samuel Crowell House	109 Brunswick Street; Yarmouth NS	43°50′55″N 66°06′39″W	Nova Scotia (3288)	Q137824009	Upload Photo
Durkee Memorial Library	4048 No. 340 Highway; Carleton NS	44°00′27″N 65°55′38″W	Carleton municipality (5212)	Q137824019	Upload Photo
East Kemptville Free Baptist Church	6 Minor's Road; East Kemptville NS	44°05′16″N 65°45′56″W	East Kemptville municipality (15413)	Q137824083	Upload Photo
Edmund Ellis House	3114 No. 1 Highway; Port Maitland NS	43°58′41″N 66°08′45″W	Port Maitland municipality (5200)	Q137824090	Upload Photo
Eldridge House	26 Chester Street; Yarmouth NS	43°50′29″N 66°07′04″W	Yarmouth municipality (6945)	Q137824100	Upload Photo
Founders Cemetery	Beaver River Road; Beaver River NS	44°00′00″N 66°08′43″W	Beaver River municipality (9081)	Q137824106	Upload Photo
Free Will Baptist Cemetery	Highway 1 Beaver River NS	43°59′36″N 66°09′04″W	Beaver River municipality (9095)	Q137824116	Upload Photo
Frost Park	410 Main Street; Yarmouth NS	43°50′20″N 66°07′12″W	Yarmouth municipality (6721)	Q106300671	More images
Fuller House	20 Collins Street; Yarmouth NS	43°50′12″N 66°06′59″W	Yarmouth municipality (6520)	Q136802204	More images
Lindsay Gardner House	27 Carleton Street; Yarmouth NS	43°50′09″N 66°06′57″W	Yarmouth municipality (6946)	Q137824147	Upload Photo
Gavelton Meeting House	566 Lake Vaughan Road; Gavelton NS	43°53′50″N 65°56′57″W	Gavelton municipality (15209)	Q137824154	Upload Photo
Golden Horse Fountain	Intersection of Main and Vancouver Streets; Yarmouth NS	43°51′05″N 66°06′52″W	Yarmouth municipality (6792)	Q137824161	Upload Photo
Greenville African Baptist Church	726 Greenville Road; Greenville NS	43°51′43″N 66°02′56″W	Nova Scotia (6524), Greenville municipality (5198)	Q137824166	Upload Photo
Greenville Church Cemetery	726 Greenville Road; Greenville NS	43°51′39″N 66°02′50″W	Greenville municipality (9290)	Q137824837	Upload Photo
Guest House	12 Parade Street; Yarmouth NS	43°50′17″N 66°07′04″W	Nova Scotia (3094), Yarmouth municipality (4826)	Q137824847	More images
Dr. John Harris House	56 Beaver River Road; Beaver River NS	44°00′22″N 66°08′42″W	Beaver River municipality (9316)	Q137824855	Upload Photo
Job Hatfield House	57 William Street; Yarmouth NS	43°49′55″N 66°07′02″W	Yarmouth municipality (4504)	Q137824864	More images
Peter Lent Hatfield House	8007 No. 3 Highway; Tusket NS	43°50′59″N 65°58′17″W	Nova Scotia (7088), Tusket municipality (15142)	Q137825010	Upload Photo
Holy Trinity Anglican Church	63 William Street; Yarmouth NS	43°49′57″N 66°07′03″W	Yarmouth municipality (7047)	Q137825051	More images
Holy Trinity Anglican Parish Hall	61 William Street; Yarmouth NS	43°49′57″N 66°07′03″W	Yarmouth municipality (7004)	Q137825089	Upload Photo
Holy Trinity Rectory	65 William Street; Yarmouth NS	43°49′58″N 66°07′03″W	Yarmouth municipality (7117)	Q137825097	Upload Photo
Alexander Hood House	14 Collins Street; Yarmouth NS	43°50′13″N 66°07′04″W	Yarmouth municipality (6272)	Q137825114	More images
James Jenkins, Jr. House	503 Main Street; Yarmouth NS	43°50′34″N 66°07′05″W	Yarmouth municipality (4896)	Q137825121	Upload Photo
Capt. Charles P. Kinney House	34 Porter Street; Yarmouth NS	43°50′23″N 66°06′55″W	Yarmouth municipality (4906)	Q137827210	Upload Photo
Lake George United Baptist Church	2092 Lake George Road; RR 1 Lake George NS	44°00′34″N 66°03′59″W	Lake George municipality (9083)	Q137827222	Upload Photo
J. Murray Lawson House	64 William Street; Yarmouth NS	43°49′58″N 66°07′04″W	Nova Scotia (3410), Yarmouth municipality (4918)	Q137827237	Upload Photo
Abraham Lent House	61 Horatio Wood Road; Tusket NS	43°50′53″N 65°58′42″W	Nova Scotia (3078), Tusket municipality (15103)	Q137827261	Upload Photo
Lewis Fountain	Argyle and Main Streets; Yarmouth NS	43°49′40″N 66°07′17″W	Yarmouth municipality (6663)	Q137827295	Upload Photo
Lighthouse	Argyle NS	43°23′42″N 66°00′49″W	Federal (4763)	Q137827360	Upload Photo
Lovitt House	10 Parade Street; Yarmouth NS	43°50′16″N 66°07′06″W	Nova Scotia (3545), Yarmouth municipality (4578)	Q137827398	More images
Andrew Lovitt House	90 Main Shore Road; Milton Highlands NS	43°51′19″N 66°07′31″W	Milton Highlands municipality (5207)	Q137827427	Upload Photo
Sen. John Lovitt Barn	10 Parade Street; Yarmouth NS	43°50′16″N 66°07′06″W	Yarmouth municipality (6271)	Q137827486	Upload Photo
William L. Lovitt House	33 Vancouver Street; Yarmouth NS	43°51′09″N 66°07′10″W	Yarmouth municipality (6224)	Q137827626	Upload Photo
MacKinnon-Cann House	27 Willow Street; Yarmouth NS	43°50′11″N 66°07′02″W	Nova Scotia (5462), Yarmouth municipality (4920)	Q137827673	Upload Photo
Charles Moody House	25 Willow Street; Yarmouth NS	43°50′10″N 66°07′02″W	Yarmouth municipality (6522)	Q137827713	Upload Photo
Rev. John & Sarah Moody House	17 Forest Street; Yarmouth NS	43°49′58″N 66°07′09″W	Yarmouth municipality (6307)	Q137827787	More images
Byron R. Murphy House	2775 Highway 3 Pubnico NS	43°47′47″N 65°51′24″W	Pubnico municipality (15225)	Q137827826	Upload Photo
Murray Manor	225 Main Street; Yarmouth NS	43°49′58″N 66°07′11″W	Yarmouth municipality (4958)	Q137827896	Upload Photo
Ensign Nickerson House	46 Alma Street; Yarmouth NS	43°50′08″N 66°06′51″W	Yarmouth municipality (7247)	Q137827937	Upload Photo
Old Yarmouth Academy	113 Main Street; Yarmouth NS	43°49′42″N 66°07′15″W	Nova Scotia (6527), Yarmouth municipality (4953)	Q137828106	Upload Photo
Port Maitland Cattle Pound	No. 1 Highway; Port Maitland NS	43°58′07″N 66°08′36″W	Port Maitland municipality (5160)	Q136528446	Upload Photo
Benjamin B. Porter House	546 Cedar Lake Road; Port Maitland NS	44°01′30″N 66°06′12″W	Port Maitland municipality (5210)	Q136528434	Upload Photo
George & Elizabeth Porter House	21 Clements Street; Yarmouth NS	43°50′09″N 66°06′50″W	Yarmouth municipality (6314)	Q137828201	Upload Photo
Knowles Porter House	9994 No. 3 Highway; Arcadia NS	43°49′33″N 66°03′22″W	Arcadia municipality (9085)	Q137828868	Upload Photo
Raynardton Free Baptist Church	1486 Hamilton Road; Raynardton NS	43°55′35″N 65°57′03″W	Raynardton municipality (9317)	Q137828893	More images
William H. Redding House	625 No. 1 Highway; Hebron NS	43°52′48″N 66°05′41″W	Hebron municipality (5209)	Q137828924	Upload Photo
Charles Richards House	17 Collins Street; Yarmouth NS	43°50′11″N 66°06′59″W	Nova Scotia (5413)	Q137828971	More images
William Ricker House	10 Rickers Hill Rd. Robert's Island NS	43°47′15″N 65°53′03″W	Robert's Island municipality (15213)	Q137829043	Upload Photo
Rockville United Baptist Church	1379 Chebogue Road; Rockville NS	43°46′30″N 66°06′50″W	Rockville municipality (9058)	Q137829072	Upload Photo
Sainte Anne's Catholic Church	7309 Highway 3 Ste. Anne du Ruisseau NS	43°50′14″N 65°56′06″W	Ste. Anne du Ruisseau municipality (15222)	Q3584924	More images
St. Stephen's Anglican Church	8340 No. 3 Highway; Tusket NS	43°51′44″N 65°58′37″W	Nova Scotia (7262), Tusket municipality (15104)	Q137829144	Upload Photo
Capt. Ebenezer Scott House	37 Alma Street; Yarmouth NS	43°50′09″N 66°06′58″W	Yarmouth municipality (8190)	Q137829187	Upload Photo
Ellery Scott House	7 Main Street; Yarmouth NS	43°49′14″N 66°07′18″W	Yarmouth municipality (6518)	Q137829213	Upload Photo
Alfred Shaw House	18 Forest Street; Yarmouth NS	43°50′00″N 66°07′08″W	Yarmouth municipality (4917)	Q137829257	Upload Photo
Joseph Sleeth House	39 Alma Street; Yarmouth NS	43°50′08″N 66°06′55″W	Yarmouth municipality (6544)	Q137829286	Upload Photo
Sluice Point School and Community Centre	6 L'Anse des Bourques; Sluice Point NS	43°47′13″N 65°57′56″W	Sluice Point municipality (15210)	Q137829313	Upload Photo
South Canaan Free Baptist Church	638 Wilson Road; South Canaan NS	43°55′02″N 65°51′52″W	South Canaan municipality (9213)	Q137829335	Upload Photo
Jacob Sweeny House	44 Huntington Street; Yarmouth NS	43°50′54″N 66°06′36″W	Yarmouth municipality (6273)	Q137829359	Upload Photo
Tusket Cemetery	8112 Highway 3 Tusket NS	43°51′05″N 65°58′26″W	Tusket municipality (15385)	Q137829383	Upload Photo
Tusket Lakes Cemetery	465 Canaan Road; Gavelton NS	43°55′00″N 65°56′05″W	Gavelton municipality (9198)	Q137829409	Upload Photo
James H. Vickery House	156 Meadowbrook Drive; South Ohio NS	43°56′03″N 66°04′56″W	South Ohio municipality (5211)	Q137829457	Upload Photo
War Memorial and Park	405 Main Street; Yarmouth NS	43°50′19″N 66°07′11″W	Yarmouth municipality (6652)	Q137829477	More images
Sydney Wearne House	134 Cornubia Road; Gavelton NS	43°54′01″N 65°57′00″W	Gavelton municipality (9268)	Q137829505	Upload Photo
Richard Williams Jr. House	89 Main Shore Road; Milton Highlands NS	43°51′20″N 66°07′33″W	Milton Highlands municipality (5214)	Q137829534	Upload Photo
William Winter House	1386 Lake George Road; Brenton NS	43°58′51″N 66°03′40″W	Brenton municipality (5201)	Q137829553	Upload Photo
Yarmouth County Museum	22 Collins Street; Yarmouth NS	43°50′12″N 66°06′58″W	Yarmouth municipality (6519)	Q8049396	More images
Yarmouth's First Hospital	1 Sycamore Street; Yarmouth NS	43°49′31″N 66°07′10″W	Yarmouth municipality (4790)	Q137829572	Upload Photo
Zion Baptist Church	27 Parade Street; Yarmouth NS	43°50′15″N 66°06′59″W	Yarmouth municipality (7248)	Q137829591	Upload Photo

== See also ==
- List of historic places in Nova Scotia
- List of National Historic Sites of Canada in Nova Scotia
- Heritage Property Act (Nova Scotia)
