= Tusket River =

Coordinates: 43°53′1″N 65°59′2″W

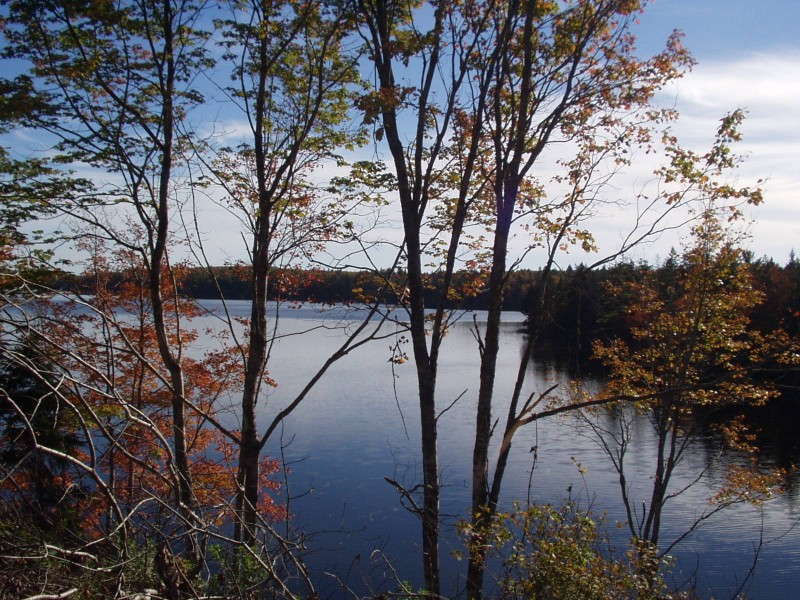

Location
- Country: Canada
- Province: Nova Scotia

Physical characteristics
- Source
  - location: Long Tusket Lake
- Mouth
  - location: Gulf of Maine
  - elevation: sea level
- Length: 93 km (58 mi)
- Basin size: 2,000 km (1,200 mi)

The Tusket River is a Canadian river located in Nova Scotia's Yarmouth County.

== Geography ==
The Tusket River is a significant river system and drainage basin in Yarmouth County, southwest Nova Scotia. It has numerous branches and associated rivers, passes through several lakes, and has these features. Near its mouth, the river becomes a tidal estuary, with the water becoming brackish due to mixing of the river's fresh water with salt brought upstream from the Gulf of Maine by incoming tides.

The headwaters of the river lie in the Tobeatic Wilderness Area, which is part of the larger Southwest Nova Biosphere Reserve.

== Natural history ==
=== Flora ===
The river is nationally significant for its many coastal plain plant species. Some, like the Plymouth Gentian (Sabatia kennedyana) and Pink Coreopsis (Coreopsis rosea) occur nowhere else in Canada. These species occur on gently-sloping sand and gravel shorelines lower in the watershed. There is an online guide to assist with identifying all these species. Wilson's Lake has one of the largest populations of Atlantic Coastal Plain plants in Canada, and is the site of the small but highly significant Tusket River Nature Reserve. In 2011 botanists exploring a newly acquired protected area, the Jack and Darlene Stone Conservation Lands, discovered another rare plant species, Maleberry (Lyonia ligustrina), the first time this species has been found growing in Canada.

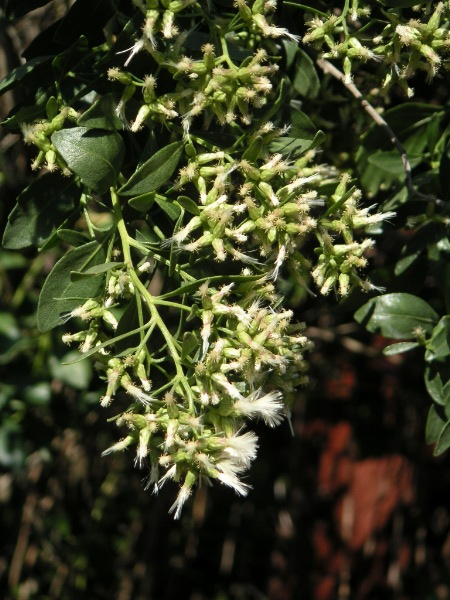
Groundseltree (Baccharis halimifolia)

Groundseltree (Baccharis halimifolia) reaches its northern limit in North America near the Tusket River Estuary. This white-flowering shrub in the aster family ranges southward along the Atlantic Coastal Plain and Gulf Coastal Plain coastal plain to Florida and Texas.

=== Fish ===
Sport fishing in the Tusket River is very popular. The upper reaches, served by Trout Point lodge, were named one of the top 10 fishing spots in the world by The Guardian in 2006.

There is a commercial "river herring" fishery in the river (alewife and blueback herring), which employs dip nets and fixed gill nets.

== Communities ==
Communities located along the Tusket River, from northeast to southwest, include:

- East Kemptville
- North Kemptville
- Kemptville
- East Quinan
- Quinan
- Canaan
- South Canaan
- Springhaven
- Gavelton
- Tusket Falls
- Tusket
- Pleasant Lake
- Hubbard's Point
- Amirault's Hill
- Plymouth
- Sluice Point
- Upper Wedgeport
- Wedgeport
- Lower Wedgeport

== See also ==
- List of rivers of Nova Scotia
