= Lake Vaughan =

Lake in Nova Scotia, Canada

- Location within Nova Scotia
- Location: Yarmouth District, Nova Scotia
- Coordinates: 43°54′29.9″N 65°57′46.0″W
- Type: reservoir, artificial lake
- Primary inflows: Gavels Lake, Raynards Lake
- Primary outflows: Tusket River
- Basin countries: Canada
- First flooded: 1929
- Islands: 9

Lake Vaughan is a lake in the Canadian province of Nova Scotia, located in Yarmouth County. The shores of Lake Vaughan were settled by Acadians after 1755.

== Communities ==
Communities located along Lake Vaughan include:

- Gavelton
- Raynardton
- Tusket Falls

== See also ==
- List of lakes in Nova Scotia
