= Nova Scotia Route 308 =

Highway in Nova Scotia, Canada

Route 308

Route information
- Maintained by Nova Scotia Department of Transportation and Infrastructure Renewal
- Length: 45 km (28 mi)

Major junctions
- South end: Chemin A. Leo in Morris Island
- Trunk 3 / Hwy 103 in Tusket
- North end: Coldstream Road in Quinan (East Quinan)

Location
- Country: Canada
- Province: Nova Scotia
- Counties: Yarmouth

Highway system
- Provincial highways in Nova Scotia; 100-series
← Route 307	→ Route 309

Route 308 is a collector road in the Canadian province of Nova Scotia.

It is located in Yarmouth County and connects Morris Island with East Quinan.

The many Acadian communities along the road inspired the name of an Acadian restaurant in Halifax, "308 South".

== Communities ==
- Morris Island
- Surette's Island
- Amiraults Hill
- Tusket (Hubbard's Point - Tusket - Belleville North)
- Bell Neck
- Quinan (Springhaven - Quinan - East Quinan)

== See also ==
- List of Nova Scotia provincial highways
