= Nova Scotia Route 304 =

Highway in Nova Scotia, Canada

Route 304

Route information
- Maintained by Nova Scotia Department of Transportation and Infrastructure Renewal
- Length: 10 km (6.2 mi)

Major junctions
- South end: Cape Forchu Lighthouse in Cape Forchu
- North end: Trunk 1 in Yarmouth

Location
- Country: Canada
- Province: Nova Scotia
- Counties: Yarmouth

Highway system
- Provincial highways in Nova Scotia; 100-series
← Route 303	→ Route 305

Route 304 is a collector road in the Canadian province of Nova Scotia.

It is located in Yarmouth County and connects Yarmouth at Trunk 1 with Cape Forchu.

== Communities ==
- Yarmouth
- Milton
- Milton Highlands
- Overton
- Yarmouth Bar
- Cape Forchu

== See also ==
- List of Nova Scotia provincial highways
