= Forest Glen =

The name Forest Glen may refer to:

Australia

- Forest Glen, New South Wales, a suburb of Sydney
- Forest Glen, Queensland, a town on the Sunshine Coast

United States

- Forest Glen, Chicago, Illinois, a neighborhood
  - Forest Glen station (Illinois), a Metra station
- Forest Glen, Maryland, a census-designated place near Silver Spring
  - Forest Glen station, a Washington Metro station
- Forest Glen Beach, Wisconsin, an unincorporated community
- Forest Glen Park, Maryland, an unincorporated community
  - Forest Glen Annex, a U.S. Army installation

Canada

- Forest Glen, Nova Scotia
