= Annis =

Annis is a female given name.

- Annis Lee Wister (1830-1908), American translator

It may also refer to:

== Places ==
- Annis, Idaho
- Annis Mound and Village Site
- Carlston Annis Shell Mound
- Lake Annis, a lake in Nova Scotia, Canada
- Lake Annis, Nova Scotia, a community near the namesake lake
- 137165 Annis, an asteroid

== As a surname ==
- B. J. Annis (born 1947), American bodybuilder and professional wrestler
- Francesca Annis (born 1945), English actress
- Matthew Annis, Canadian professional wrestler
- Ted Annis (born 1980), Canadian professional wrestler

== Mythology and fiction ==
- Black Annis, a bogeyman figure in English folklore
