= Port Maitland =

Port Maitland may refer to:

- Port Maitland, Ontario
- Port Maitland, Nova Scotia
