= John's Cove =

John's Cove may refer to:

- John's Cove (New Jersey)
- Johns Cove, Nova Scotia
