= Kemptville (disambiguation) =

Kemptville is a community located in North Grenville in Ontario, Canada. It can also refer to:

- Kemptville, Nova Scotia
  - East Kemptville, Nova Scotia
  - North Kemptville, Nova Scotia
- Kemptville Creek, a stream in eastern Ontario, Canada
