= Glenwood Bay =

Bay in Nova Scotia, Canada

- Location within Canada
- Coordinates: 43°46′56″N 65°52′23″W
- Type: Bay

Glenwood Bay is a bay in Yarmouth County in Nova Scotia, Canada. Its name was officially introduced on 16 July 1974.
