= Short Beach (disambiguation) =

Short Beach may refer to:

== Places ==
- Short Beach, Connecticut.
- Short Beach, New York
- Short Beach, Oregon
- Short Beach, Nova Scotia
