= École secondaire de Par-en-Bas =

Coordinates: 43.870428°N 65.963665°W

Location
- 360 Route 308 North; Tusket, Nova Scotia; Canada

Information
- Type: High School
- Motto: Le succès par le travail
- Established: 2001
- Principal: Marc Émond
- Grades: 7-12
- Enrollment: 400
- Colors: Blue, White and Red
- Mascot: Shark
- Website: espb.ednet.ns.ca

École secondaire de Par-en-Bas (commonly known as Par-en-bas, PEB or ESPB) is a French language secondary school located in Tusket, Yarmouth County in the province of Nova Scotia, Canada. Built primarily for the local Acadian community, the school educates approximately 400 students from grades 7 to 12.

== History ==
Par-en-bas was built to separate the French-speaking students from the English-speaking students of the École Sainte-Anne-du-Ruisseau, which was closed in 2001 due to the building's age and a growing interest in dividing the student population by language. The school is overseen by the Conseil scolaire acadien provincial (Acadian Provincial School Board).

In 2009, the construction of an amphitheatre and community center as an addition to the school was completed in 2009. In 2011, the school grounds were upgraded in preparation for hosting soccer matches during the 2012 Jeux de l'Acadie.

== Administration ==
- Marc Émond - Principal
- Cheryl Bourque-Wells - Vice Principal
