= Bunker Island, Nova Scotia =

Peninsula in Nova Scotia, Canada

Bunker Island
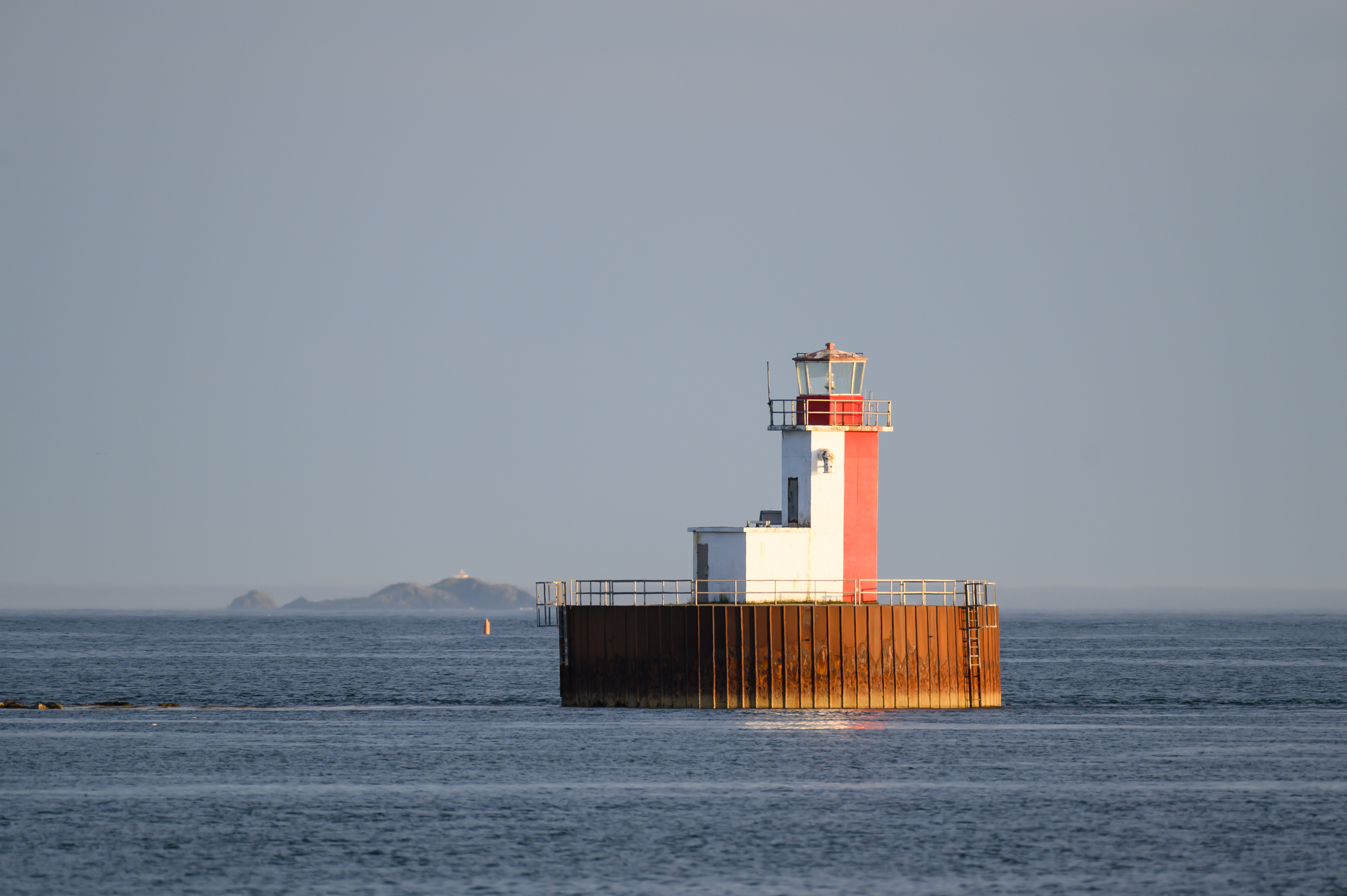
- Bunker Island Lighthouse as seen from Fish Point at high tide
- Location: Bunker Island, Yarmouth Harbour, Yarmouth County, Nova Scotia, Canada
- Coordinates: 43°48′58″N 66°8′6″W
- Constructed: 1874
- Foundation: Caisson

Light
- First lit: 1874

Bunker Island is a tidal island located in Yarmouth Harbour in Yarmouth County, Nova Scotia. It contains a lighthouse which is nicknamed Bug Light by the locals.

In the past, it also contained Irving oil tanks and a wharf. The tanks were removed in 2017.

== Bug Light ==
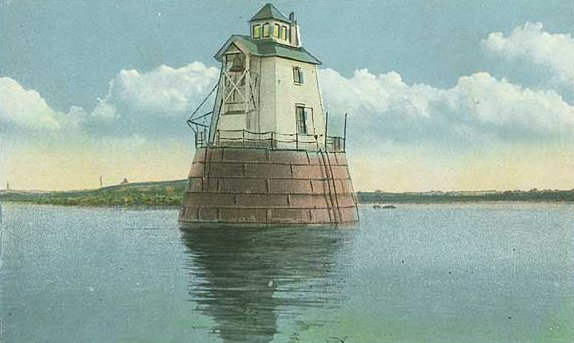
Drawing of Bunker Island Bug Light c. 1920

Bug Light is a small lighthouse built on a caisson that is reachable from Bunker Island at low tide. It was erected in 1874 as a supplement to the Cape Forchu lightstation. The current structure is unmanned and it replaces an earlier building which contained living quarters (see photo). The superstructure was rebuilt and the lighthouse replaced in 1959. The Cottreau family was the last to live in the house. They moved to a new dwelling on Bunker Island when the lighthouse was rebuilt.

There are also "Bug Light" lighthouses in Orient, NY and South Portland, Maine.
