= Lucy Anne Rogers Butler =

- Born: Lucy Anne Harrington Rogers; March 24, 1841; Yarmouth County, Nova Scotia, British North America
- Died: January 25, 1906 (aged 64); Halifax, Nova Scotia, Canada
- Occupations: Diarist, educator, social worker
- Notable work: A diary penned while sailing aboard the Daisy, a 19th-century brig bound for South America
- Spouse: John Kendrick Butler (m. 1870)
- Children: 2

Lucy Anne Rogers Butler (born Lucy Anne Harrington Rogers; March 24, 1841 – January 25, 1906), also known as Annie Rogers Butler, was a writer and social justice advocate. Her personal diary, which chronicled her travels with Captain John Kendrick Butler during the early years of their marriage, documents the lifestyle of Canadian mariners and their wives and widows during the mid to late 19th century.

== Formative years ==
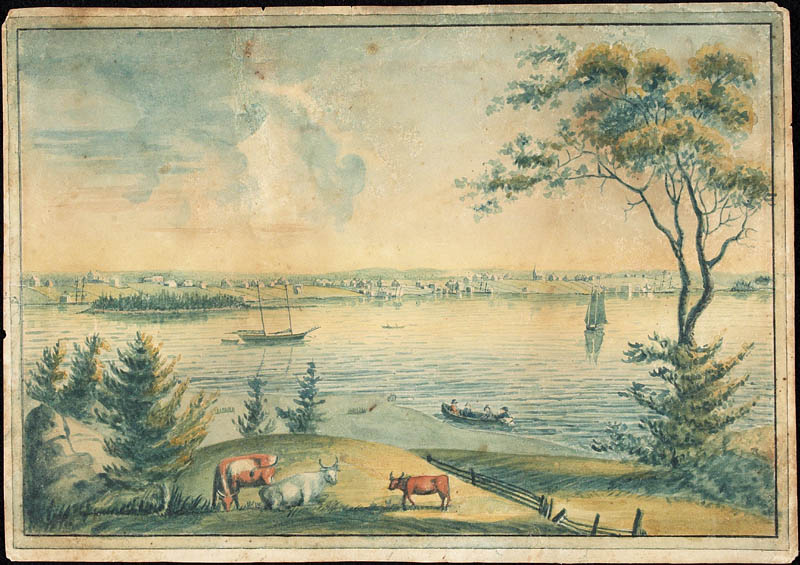
View of Yarmouth from Milton, Nova Scotia, Sarah Bond Farish, 1829 (Peter Winkworth Collection. Library and Archives Canada, e000756709), CC BY 2.0.

Born in Yarmouth County, Nova Scotia, Canada on March 24, 1841, Lucy Anne Harrington Rogers was known to family and friends as "Annie", and was the eighth child of Elsie (Knowles) Rogers (1808-1849) and Benjamin Rogers (1801-1884), a shipbuilder in Yarmouth County, Nova Scotia.

Reared in a household which adhered to "the strict discipline of the Wesleyan Methodist tradition," and "well educated" in comparison to the children of other families of her era according to Toni Ann Laidlaw, a professor of education at Dalhousie University who researched Butler's life, Annie Rogers was just eight years old when her mother died in 1849, and was laid to rest at the Yarmouth Mountain Cemetery in Yarmouth County, Nova Scotia. Her father then remarried – to Rebecca Crosby (1817-1884) sometime around 1850. Shortly thereafter, her father and his second wife greeted the arrival of a daughter, Alice (1851-1857), followed by sons, Franklin (1853-1881) and Clarence Rogers (1857-1912) (all of whom were half-siblings to Lucy Anne Rogers). At least one of her brothers grew up to become a mariner. Their sister, Mary Eliza, went on to wed George Smith, but died young in 1864, as did their older sister, Ruth, who died in 1850.

== Marriage and adventures at sea ==
At the age of 29, Annie Rogers embarked on a new journey when she wed master mariner John Kendrick Butler (1837-1876) at the Providence Church in Yarmouth on June 9, 1870, and moved with him to Boston, Massachusetts, in the United States, where he had secured employment as captain of the Daisy, a brig slated to sail for South America. According to Laidlaw:

When Annie agreed to accompany John on the Daisy for what was to be a honeymoon voyage, neither could have predicted the delays and the dangers they would encounter because of an epidemic of yellow fever raging in Buenos Aires. The trip would take more than 13 months. On 3 Jan. 1871, after 98 days at sea, Annie began a journal to record her observations, thoughts, and feelings during the remaining voyage. Ironically, it is this private document that has brought her to the attention of the public.

Using her diary to document her husband's work as the captain of a trading vessel, Annie Butler also illustrated what it was like to be the only woman on a small ship staffed by men from a different social class, who were often intemperate in speech as well as with their alcohol consumption. In addition to baking, preserving food, and washing the clothes she and her husband wore, she also recruited male members of the ship's crew to assist her with keeping the ship clean, and "donated a Bible to them, prayed on their behalf, tended the sick, and offered comfort when they became 'blue,'" according to Laidlaw, who noted that Butler was frustrated by men who failed "to observe the sabbath."

Annie's diary also reflects the close relationships that women shared as relatives and friends. She particularly missed her sister Maria ("Rie") and often dreamt of her.... She had the occasional opportunity to socialize with the wives of other captains off Buenos Aires, and these brief encounters were a source of pleasure. The deep affection that she and John shared could not quench her desire for female companionship.

Their business concluded in South America, Annie Butler, her husband and his crew ultimately returned safely to Boston. Returning to Yarmouth in Nova Scotia, Canada, she and her husband began to build their lives there, greeting the arrival of son Frank in April 1872 and daughter Elsie in 1875. But their happy life was short lived.

A mariner at heart, her husband was pulled back to the sea sometime in 1876 – a decision which proved to be a hazardous and ultimately fatal one. On September 12, 1866, he nearly died as ship's master of the Clifford when the 105-ton brigantine was pushed onshore at Saint Kitt's during a hurricane. Owned by B. Rogers & Son, the ship had been insured for $3,500, and was ultimately declared a total wreck.

Just three months later, John K. Butler was back at sea, but this time his luck ran out. Initially announced to be missing when his ship, the brigantine Clarence sank en route to Martinique in the West Indies on December 8, 1876, he was ultimately determined to have been lost at sea and declared dead. The ship, another owned by B. Rogers & Son, had been insured for $12,000, and had departed from Yarmouth two days earlier on its maiden voyage with a cargo of fish and lumber. The crewmen who perished with Capt. Butler were: Rufus Nickerson, steward; William Utley, mate; William Benson, James Purdy, and Robert Robbins. In its April 12, 1877, notice, "Remarkable Circumstance," the Yarmouth Herald described how her husband had been killed:

Some weeks ago we stated, that the brigantine "Clarence," Capt. John K. Butler, and the schooner "Bessie Gardner," Capt. Bowman Crosby, both of which sailed from this port in December last for Martinique, had been given up for lost, both having doubtless foundered in the gale of 9th of that month. It is a remarkable circumstance that both of these captains lost the vessels which they commanded at the same time, in a hurricane in the West Indies, last autumn, viz., the brigantines "Clifford," and "Sophia," and both returned home with Capt. Durkee, in the brigantine "Vesta." On their next voyage to the West Indies, all three captains perished, Capt. Durkee having been washed overboard from the "Vesta" in the same gale in which it is supposed the others were lost....

== Life as a widow ==
Newly widowed with two small children, Annie Butler opted to remain in Yarmouth County, Nova Scotia, where she could live near her immediate family, as well as her husband's parents. In May 1882, she founded her own school in Yarmouth, and provided instruction to six kindergarten-aged children of relatives and an additional three youngsters who were the children of other members of her community for a fee of 25 cents per week.

By 1891, Annie Butler had found a more stable form of employment as matron of the Protestant Orphans' Home in Halifax, Nova Scotia, which had been established "to provide orphans and destitute children of both sexes with a comfortable home, educational facilities, and religious instruction during the time of their residence in the institution." According to Laidlaw:

Annie belonged to a group of paid female workers whose responsibilities included administering charitable programs for working-class women and children [aged two and older]. They were the predecessors of women who would later enter the profession of social work. Their activity reflected the Christian concern for those who were poor or disadvantaged.

Retiring from social work in 1900, Annie Butler spent her final years in Halifax, residing not far from the orphans' home where she had helped so many young children find a new pathway forward. Residing with her until her death on January 25, 1906, were her children Frank and Elsie. She was then laid to rest in the same cemetery where her parents and sister were buried – the Yarmouth Mountain Cemetery in Yarmouth County.
