= Chegoggin, Nova Scotia =

Community in Nova Scotia, Canada

Coordinates: 43°53′3.87″N 66°6′29.41″W

Chegoggin in Nova Scotia

Chegoggin is a community in the Canadian province of Nova Scotia, located in the Yarmouth Municipal District in Yarmouth County. The name derives from a Mi'kmaq word.

In 2000, Swedish archaeologist Mats Larsson of Lund University put forward a claim that Chegoggin is his prime candidate for the location of Leif Erikson's Vinland. Having explored up and down the coasts of Atlantic Canada, Larsson believes that Chegoggin best fits the description of Vinland as given in the Norse sagas.

== Notable people ==
- Sara Corning, humanitarian, nurse, and orphanage founder during the Greco-Turkish War.
