= Rockville, Nova Scotia =

Community in Nova Scotia, Canada

Coordinates: 43°46′33.79″N 66°7′8.34″W

Norwood in Nova Scotia

Rockville is a community in the Canadian province of Nova Scotia, located in Yarmouth County near Kelley's Cove.
