= Beaver River, Nova Scotia =

Community in Nova Scotia, Canada

Coordinates: 44°0′53.25″N 66°8′58.34″W

Beaver River in Nova Scotia

Beaver River is a rural community that straddles the Digby County and Yarmouth County line, located on the southwest coast of Nova Scotia, Canada, near the town of Yarmouth.

== History ==
=== Indigenous heritage ===
The area now known as Beaver River was part of the traditional territory of the Mi'kmaq people, who inhabited Mi'kma'ki — the lands encompassing present-day Nova Scotia — for thousands of years before European contact. The community's location was known to the Mi'kmaq by two names: Elsetcook, meaning "Flowing by high banks", and Wesek, meaning "The Beaver's Home", both reflecting the character of the river that defines the area.

=== European settlement ===
The first European settlers arrived at Beaver River by 1761, making the community among the earliest rural settlements established in southwestern Nova Scotia following the arrival of New England Planters in the region after 1759. Approximately 97 percent of the original settlers were descendants of New England families who had settled at Chebogue, near present-day Yarmouth. According to accounts handed down by pioneer families, the settlers travelled to Beaver River from the Cape Forchu– Overton area by small boat and landed near the site where the Temperance Hall would later be built, though the precise date of this landing is not recorded.

The founding family surnames included Landers, Pitman, Sanders, Crosby, Patten, Cann, Goudey, Perry, Jeffrey, Tedford, Corning, Killam, Trask, Blackadar, Byrnes, Phillips, Kelley, Porter, and Sollows, many of which remain common in Yarmouth County today. The community was known for its insular character; accounts from the period describe the early settlers as reluctant to accept outsiders into their settlement.

The original settlers occupied Crown-owned land without formal title. On July 6, 1814, six residents — Johnathan Corning Sr., Johnathan Corning Jr., Josiah Porter, Ashael Corning, Daniel Corning, and William Perry — petitioned Sir John Coape Sherbrooke, then Lieutenant Governor of Nova Scotia, for land grants, stating that none of them had ever received land from the government and that they were "in want of land to settle themselves thereon." The Surveyor General, Charles Morris, noted on the petition that "these petitioners are reputed to be industrious farmers and as such merit favourable consideration." Despite this endorsement, formal land grants were not issued until December 27, 1827 — thirteen years after the petition was submitted and sixty-six years after the first settlers arrived.

=== Early industry ===
The principal industries of early Beaver River were lumber and milling. Two sawmills were established along Bartlett's Brook and the Beaver River itself: one built and owned privately by Josiah Porter, and a second constructed jointly by the community and held in common by those who participated in its building. By 1829, approximately 68 years after first settlement, the community was considered to be fairly well established.

Building materials were primarily local wood and stone, though the settlement also supported two brick-making kilns. A blacksmith shop, operated for several decades by Philip Doty, served the community and surrounding area through at least the period 1890–1910, when the post office was also administered from the Doty household.

=== The fire of 1820 ===
On September 11, 1820, a wind-driven fire swept through Beaver River, destroying nearly every structure in the settlement for a distance of three miles. Both sawmills, the grist mill, hay barns, and the majority of livestock were lost. Only three houses survived. Families fled on foot in darkness and smoke toward the lake and the shoreline; one child perished in the fire.

A firsthand account written in 1844 by Reuben M. Raymond, who was present during the fire, described the scene: "What a sea of fire rowling along with the greatest speed" and recorded that survivors sheltered in the lake through the night until the wind abated near two o'clock in the morning.

The community subsequently rebuilt, and by the late 19th century Beaver River had re-established itself as a functioning rural settlement.
