= Johns Cove, Nova Scotia =

Community in Nova Scotia, Canada

Coordinates: 43.8029°N 66.1501°W

Johns Cove is a small bay located on the Cape Forchu peninsula in the Municipality of Yarmouth, Nova Scotia. The cove is located in Yarmouth Sound and until the cancellation of the service in 2009 the CAT Ferry could be seen arriving and departing Yarmouth Harbour. Johns Cove is located 4 kilometers away from the town of Yarmouth. The beach is a popular destination for residents from Yarmouth due to its close proximity.

== History ==
Johns Cove is named after Cornelius John Fox who was the second lighthouse keeper of the Cape Forchu Lighthouse in 1841. His father was the first. The beach was important because it sheltered fishermen from the sea and enabled them to haul their boats up on shore for repairs.
