= Milton Highlands, Nova Scotia =

Community in Nova Scotia, Canada

Milton Highlands
- Location of Milton Highlands in
- Coordinates: 43.855587°N 66.125358°W
- Country: Canada
- Province: Nova Scotia
- District municipality: Yarmouth

Area (2021)
  - Land: 1.48 km^{2} (0.57 sq mi)

Population (2021)
  - Total: 320
- Time zone: UTC– 04:00 (AST)
  - Summer (DST): UTC– 03:00 (ADT)
- Area code: 902

Milton Highlands (2021 population: 320) is an unincorporated community within the Municipality of the District of Yarmouth in Nova Scotia, Canada. It is recognized as a designated place by Statistics Canada.

== Geography ==
Milton Highlights is at the intersection of Main Shore Road and Lakeside Road, just north of Route 304. It is 2 km (1.2 mi) north of the Town of Yarmouth.

=== Climate ===
Climate is from Yarmouth Airport located 4.4 km (2.7 mi) to the southeast.

The area has a humid continental climate (Köppen: Dfb), closely bordering on an oceanic climate (Köppen: Cfb), typical of climates surrounded by the sea but close to large continents such as southern Norway and coastal Hokkaido but with latitude variations. Being near the -3 °C isotherm in the average of the coldest month (east of the city), causing that in peninsular areas like Yarmouth Bar and Cape Forchu are between a transition band for the oceanic climates (Cfb). Winters are cool and rainy with a January average of −2.6 °C (27.3 °F) though owing to strong maritime influences, temperatures below −20 °C (−4 °F) are very rare, and the average high never drops to below freezing at any point in the year. During this period of time, the weather can be unsettled and cloudy due to the Nor'easters coming up the coast from the southwest. As a result, the area averages only 68–100 hours of sunshine from December to February or 25%–34% of possible sunshine. The average annual snowfall is 204.7 cm (80.6 in), which can come from Nor'easters from the southwest with a maximum snow depth of 9 cm (3.5 in) in January, owing to its mild winters, among the mildest in Canada east of the Rockies.

The area's summers are cool due to the strong coastal influence from the sea which keeps summer temperatures cool, meaning temperatures above 30 °C (86 °F) are very rare. The average temperature in the warmest month, August is 17.5 °C (63.5 °F). Spring and fall are transitional seasons in which falls are warmer than spring since the waters are at the warmest temperatures in fall and the coldest during early spring. Precipitation is significant, averaging 1,290.1 mm (50.79 in) a year, with July and August the driest months on average and November the wettest month on average. An outstanding feature is the late-fall to early-winter precipitation maximum, owing to the combination of intense storm activity from November to January and relatively more-stable summers, with thunderstorm activity here much less frequent than in the U.S. Northeast, Mid-Atlantic and points southward. Yarmouth averages 1,898.3 hours of sunshine or 41.2% of possible sunshine with summer being the sunniest and winter being the cloudiest. Yarmouth averages 191 days of fog each year.

The highest temperature ever recorded was 32.5 °C (90.5 °F) on July 16, 2013. The coldest temperature ever recorded was −24.4 °C (−11.9 °F) on February 14, 1894.

Climate data for Yarmouth (Yarmouth Airport) WMO ID: 71603; coordinates 43°49′37″N 66°05′17″W; elevation: 42.9 m (141 ft); 1991–2020 normals, extremes 1870−present (Note: Climate data was recorded in the town of Yarmouth from December 1870 to March 1941 and at Yarmouth Airport from February 1940 to present. Climate data 1991–2020 is a composite recorded at Yarmouth A, Yarmouth RCS (WMO ID: – / 71884; Climate ID: 8206500 / 8206491; coordinates 43°49′51″N 66°05′19″W / 43°49′51″N 66°05′17″W; elevation: 43.0 m (141.1 ft) / 36.0 m (118.1 ft)), and Yarmouth A (WMO ID: 71603; Climate ID: 8206495; coordinates 43°49′37″N 66°05′17″W; elevation: 42.9 m (141 ft)))
Month	Jan	Feb	Mar	Apr	May	Jun	Jul	Aug	Sep	Oct	Nov	Dec	Year
Record high humidex	15.8	16.9	17.4	24.8	27.9	38.0	37.7	37.3	36.4	30.2	26.1	19.5	38.0
Record high °C (°F)	14.0 (57.2)	15.3 (59.5)	18.3 (64.9)	21.2 (70.2)	24.8 (76.6)	30.4 (86.7)	32.5 (90.5)	30.3 (86.5)	27.7 (81.9)	22.8 (73.0)	19.3 (66.7)	16.5 (61.7)	32.5 (90.5)
Mean daily maximum °C (°F)	1.3 (34.3)	1.3 (34.3)	4.0 (39.2)	8.8 (47.8)	13.9 (57.0)	18.1 (64.6)	21.4 (70.5)	21.6 (70.9)	18.8 (65.8)	13.6 (56.5)	9.0 (48.2)	4.4 (39.9)	11.4 (52.5)
Daily mean °C (°F)	−2.6 (27.3)	−2.5 (27.5)	0.4 (32.7)	5.0 (41.0)	9.8 (49.6)	14.0 (57.2)	17.3 (63.1)	17.5 (63.5)	14.7 (58.5)	9.8 (49.6)	5.5 (41.9)	0.8 (33.4)	7.5 (45.5)
Mean daily minimum °C (°F)	−6.4 (20.5)	−6.2 (20.8)	−3.3 (26.1)	1.2 (34.2)	5.7 (42.3)	9.8 (49.6)	13.2 (55.8)	13.4 (56.1)	10.5 (50.9)	6.1 (43.0)	1.9 (35.4)	−2.9 (26.8)	3.6 (38.5)
Record low °C (°F)	−21.3 (−6.3)	−24.4 (−11.9)	−15.7 (3.7)	−10.8 (12.6)	−1.8 (28.8)	2.1 (35.8)	6.4 (43.5)	5.8 (42.4)	1.3 (34.3)	−3.2 (26.2)	−9.8 (14.4)	−16.6 (2.1)	−24.4 (−11.9)
Record low wind chill	−32.6	−32.0	−28.5	−22.5	−4.3	0.0	0.0	0.0	0.0	−6.9	−19.5	−28.2	−32.6
Average precipitation mm (inches)	123.6 (4.87)	102.8 (4.05)	110.7 (4.36)	101.4 (3.99)	99.1 (3.90)	88.7 (3.49)	78.0 (3.07)	88.1 (3.47)	95.9 (3.78)	119.3 (4.70)	143.4 (5.65)	139.1 (5.48)	1,290.1 (50.79)
Average rainfall mm (inches)	69.1 (2.72)	60.0 (2.36)	82.5 (3.25)	92.7 (3.65)	98.5 (3.88)	88.9 (3.50)	81.8 (3.22)	89.8 (3.54)	97.5 (3.84)	124.1 (4.89)	133.8 (5.27)	97.8 (3.85)	1,116.5 (43.96)
Average snowfall cm (inches)	63.6 (25.0)	46.5 (18.3)	30.8 (12.1)	9.5 (3.7)	0.2 (0.1)	0.0 (0.0)	0.0 (0.0)	0.0 (0.0)	0.0 (0.0)	0.4 (0.2)	10.0 (3.9)	43.7 (17.2)	204.7 (80.6)
Average precipitation days (≥ 0.2 mm)	20.5	16.4	14.9	13.9	13.4	11.6	9.9	9.8	10.1	12.1	15.1	19.7	167.2
Average rainy days (≥ 0.2 mm)	8.5	7.0	8.8	12.3	13.3	11.5	10.2	9.7	10.4	11.8	13.4	12.2	128.9
Average snowy days (≥ 0.2 cm)	15.5	12.0	9.0	3.1	0.1	0.0	0.0	0.0	0.0	0.2	3.1	10.2	53.2
Average relative humidity (%) (at 1500 LST)	77.8	74.1	70.3	70.3	73.4	76.7	78.7	77.1	75.4	73.0	74.5	77.3	74.9
Mean monthly sunshine hours	76.0	103.5	141.6	178.8	213.0	217.6	227.6	220.0	186.8	165.6	97.6	70.3	1,898.3
Percentage possible sunshine	26.3	35.0	38.4	44.4	46.7	47.1	48.6	50.8	49.6	48.4	33.5	25.3	41.2
Source: Environment and Climate Change Canada (extreme minimum February 1894) (sun from 1981-2010)

== Demographics ==
In the 2021 Canadian census conducted by Statistics Canada, Milton Highlands had a population of 320 living in 142 of its 149 total private dwellings, a change of −6.7% from its 2016 population of 343. With a land area of 1.48 km^{2} (0.57 sq mi), it had a population density of 216.2/km^{2} (560.0/sq mi) in 2021.
