= Sara Corning =

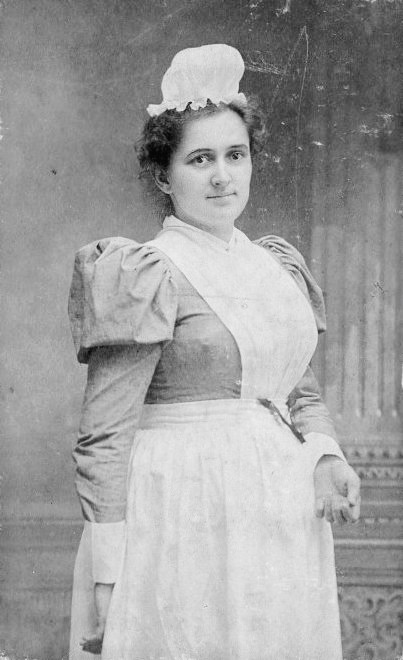
- Born: March 16, 1872; Chegoggin, Nova Scotia
- Died: May 5, 1969 (aged 97); Yarmouth, Nova Scotia
- Occupation: Nurse

Sara Corning (March 16, 1872 – May 5, 1969) was a Canadian nurse from Nova Scotia and humanitarian in the Mediterranean during the Greco-Turkish War who established orphanages for Greek and Armenian children.

== Early life ==
Corning was born in Chegoggin, Nova Scotia, the daughter Captain Samuel and Delilah (Churchill) Corning. She trained as a nurse in New Hampshire. Sara is listed as a graduate of the Mary Hitchcock Memorial Hospital School of Nursing in Hanover, New Hampshire in 1899.

== Career ==
After training at Hitchcock Hospital in Hanover, New Hampshire, she likely worked as a nurse in New Hampshire for almost 20 years. In 1917, she returned to Nova Scotia to help the victims of the Halifax Explosion.

In 1918, she joined the American Red Cross during the First World War and subsequently signed on with Near East Relief. Despite the Armistice, the Greco-Turkish War continued to rage on. In 1919, Corning was stationed at an orphanage near Yerevan in the recently declared Republic of Armenia. She next worked as an aid worker at Anatolia College in Merzifon, Turkey. In 1922, Corning travelled to Constantinople, where Near East Relief was headquartered.

At the end of 1922, Corning was sent to Smyrna. While the Turkish army was capturing the city, Corning gathered orphaned children and led them through the city to safety aboard an American ship, where they were then taken to Constantinople. She is credited with saving over 5,000 Armenian children. She later established an orphanage for the children on the Greek island of Syros. She personally adopted five girl orphans from Greece and funded their education.

In June 1923, King George II of Greece presented her with the Order of the Knights of St. Xavier for her courage and bravery.

She continued working at Anatolia College until it closed in 1930.

== Death ==
Corning later retired and moved back to her childhood home and died in Yarmouth on May 5, 1969.

== Posthumous recognition ==
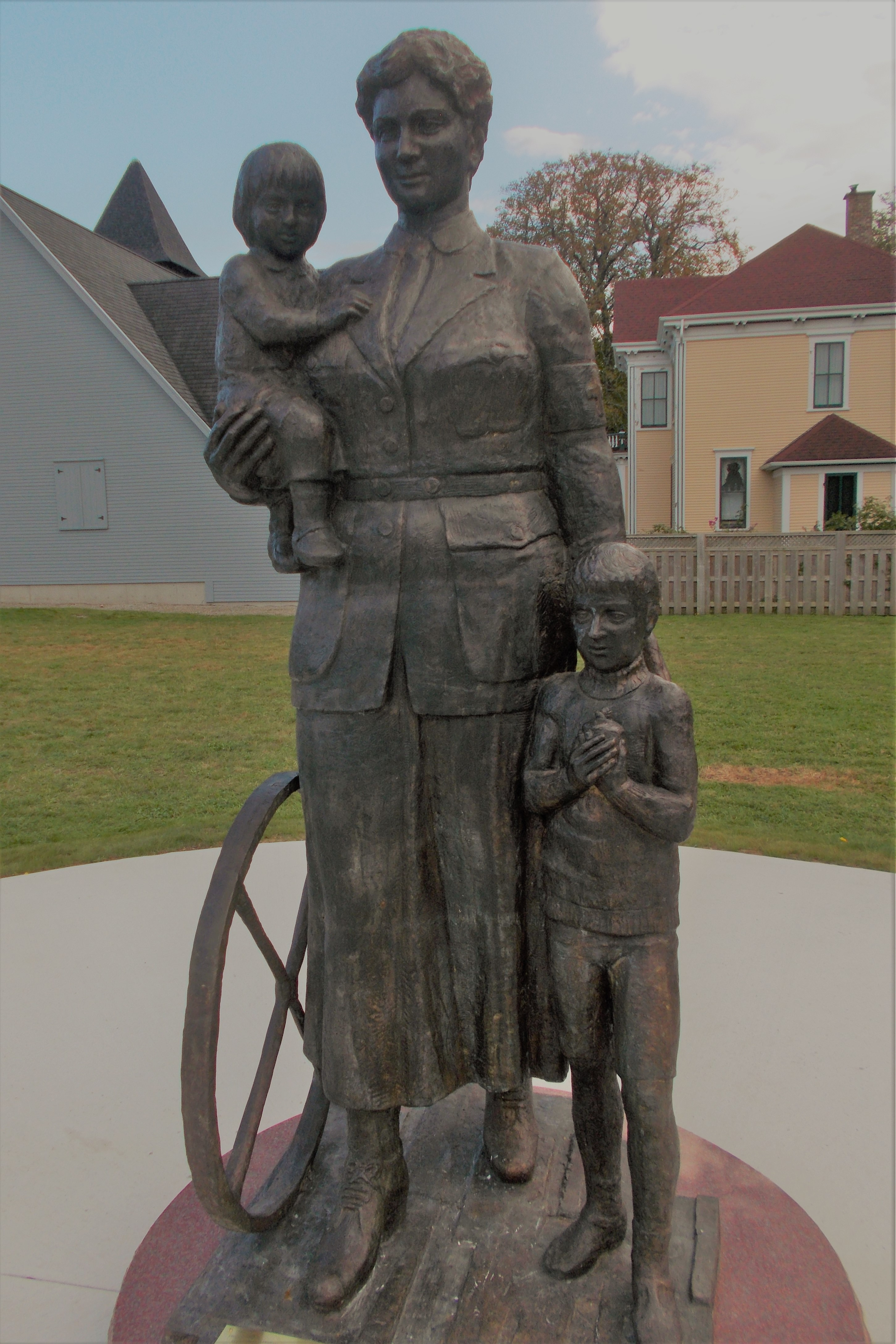
Statue of Corning and refugee children by Garen Bedrossian.

In 2004, Karekin II, the current Catholicos of All Armenians, the supreme head of the Armenian Apostolic Church, gave a Message of Blessing, which contained a tribute to Corning.

She is the namesake to the Sara Corning Centre for Genocide Education in Toronto, Ontario. She is also honored in the Yarmouth County Museum & Archives, and the Sara Corning Society (both in Nova Scotia).

In a ceremony on September 14, 2019 attended by the Hon. Arthur J. LeBlanc, Lieutenant Governor of Nova Scotia, and by Anahit Harutyunyan, ambassador to Canada of Armenia, the Sara Corning Society unveiled a statue of Corning behind the Yarmouth County Museum and Archives complex on the former site of the Zion United Baptist Church, which Corning attended in her lifetime. The statue will be a permanent fixture outside the Museum.

On September 19, 2025, a park was dedicated in her memory in North Chegoggin, close to her birthplace and her grave site.
