= Brazil Lake, Nova Scotia =

Community in Nova Scotia, Canada

Coordinates: 43°59′34.13″N 66°0′13.68″W

Brazil Lake in Nova Scotia

Brazil Lake is a community in the Canadian province of Nova Scotia, located in Yarmouth County. The area was originally known as Bloomfield, and there were four houses there by 1870. The area was later renamed to Brazil Lake, possibly because there was another community of the same name in Digby County, which could lead to mixups in the postal service.
