= Municipality of the District of Argyle =

Argyle
- District municipality
- Municipality of the District of Argyle; Municipalité du district d'Argyle
- Flag Seal
- Motto: Industry
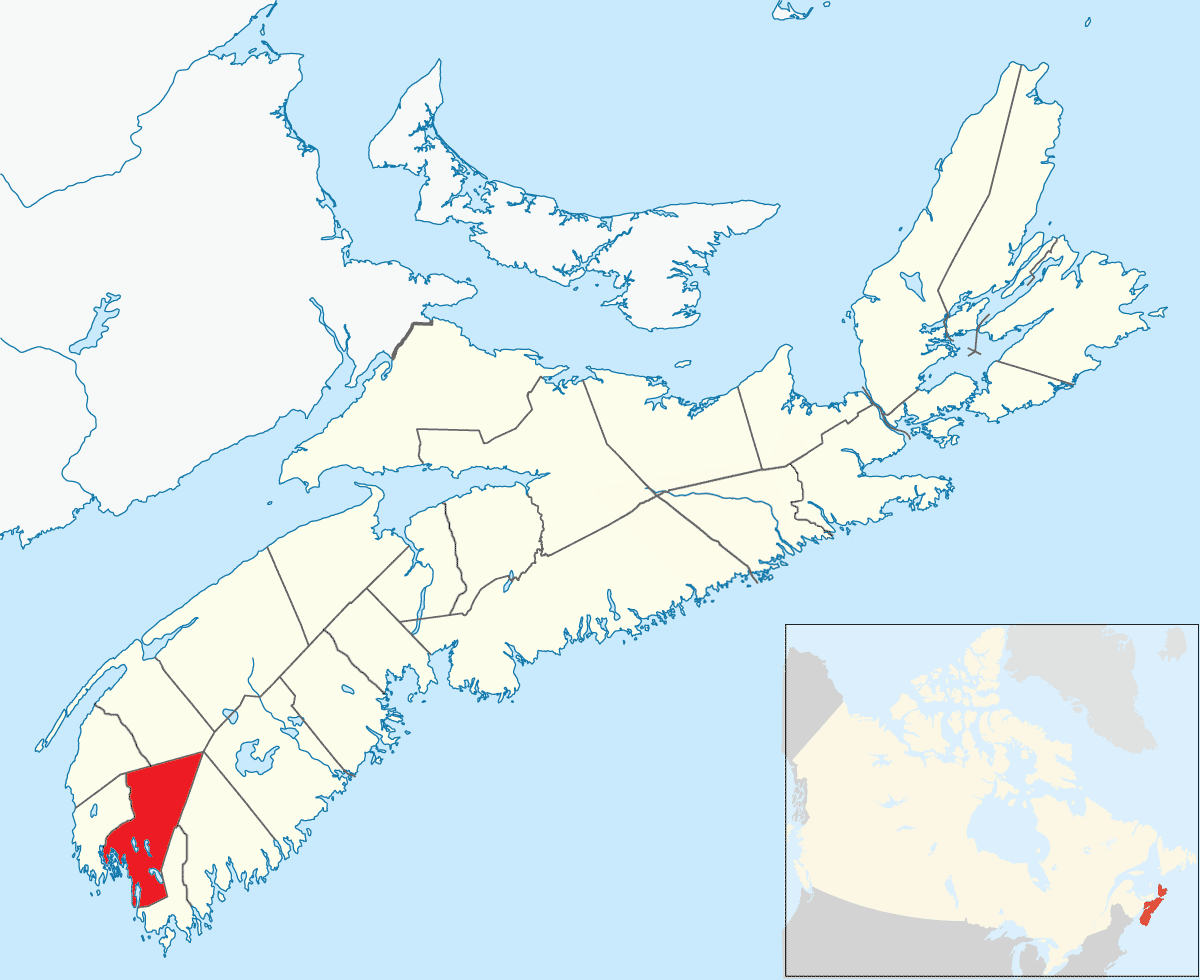
- Location of the Municipality of the District of Argyle
- Coordinates: 43°48′N 65°51′W
- Country: Canada
- Province: Nova Scotia
- County: Yarmouth
- Incorporated: April 17, 1879
- Electoral Districts Federal: Acadie—Annapolis
- Provincial: Argyle

Government
  - Type: Argyle Municipal Council
  - Municipal Seat: Tusket
  - Warden: Nicole Albright
  - Deputy Warden: Ted Saulnier
  - Councillors: List of Members: Malcolm Madden; Ted Saulnier; Gordon Boudreau; Greg Foster; Nicole Albright; Darryl LeBlanc; Kathy Bourque; Glenn Diggdon; Rachael Surette

Area
  - Land: 1,528.17 km^{2} (590.03 sq mi)

Population (2016)
  - Total: 7,899
  - Density: 5.2/km^{2} (13/sq mi)
  - Change 2011-16: ▼4.3%
- Time zone: UTC-4 (AST)
  - Summer (DST): UTC-3 (ADT)
- Area code: 902
- Dwellings: 3,821
- Median Income*: $49,898 CDN
- Website: www.munargyle.com
- *Median household income, 2005 (all households)

Argyle, officially named the Municipality of the District of Argyle, is a district municipality in Yarmouth County, Nova Scotia. Statistics Canada classifies the district municipality as a municipal district.

The district municipality occupies the eastern portion of the county and is one of three municipal units - the other two being the Town of Yarmouth and the Municipality of the District of Yarmouth. Argyle is a bilingual community, in which native speakers of English and French each account for about half of the population. As of 2016, 60% of the population speaks both French and English, one of the highest rates of bilingualism in Canada.

== History ==
Originally inhabited by the Mi'kmaq, it was called "Bapkoktek". In 1766, after his service in the French and Indian Wars, Lt. Ranald MacKinnon was given a land grant of 2,000 acres (8.1 km^{2}). He called it Argyle (Argyll) because he was reminded of his previous home in the Highlands of Scotland. The township was granted in 1771.

== Demographics ==
Historical population
Year	Pop.	±%
1961	7,810	—
1966	8,117	+3.9%
1971	8,517	+4.9%
1976	8,618	+1.2%
1981	8,949	+3.8%
1986	9,055	+1.2%
1991	9,215	+1.8%
1996	8,947	−2.9%
2001	8,688	−2.9%
2006	8,656	−0.4%
2011	8,252	−4.7%
2016	7,899	−4.3%
2021	7,870	−0.4%
Source: Statistics Canada:

In the 2021 Census of Population conducted by Statistics Canada, the Municipality of the District of Argyle had a population of 7,870 living in 3,455 of its 3,818 total private dwellings, a change of −0.4% from its 2016 population of 7,899. With a land area of 1,526.07 km^{2} (589.22 sq mi), it had a population density of 5.2/km^{2} (13.4/sq mi) in 2021. In the 2021 Canadian census conducted by Statistics Canada, the Municipality of the District of Yarmouth had a population of 10,067 living in 4,430 of its 5,072 total private dwellings, a change of 2.3% from its 2016 population of 9,845. With a land area of 584.69 km^{2} (225.75 sq mi), it had a population density of 17.2/km^{2} (44.6/sq mi) in 2021.

Mother tongue language (2021)
Language	Population	Pct (%)
English	4,430	56.68%
French	2,950	37.75%
Non-official languages	75	0.9%
English and French	360	4.61%

Ethnic groups (2021) (Note: Top ten responses)
Ethnic / cultural origin	Population	Pct (%)
Acadians	3,525	45.25%
French (nos} (Note: There were 65 French Canadians or 0.6% of the population)	1,660	21.31%
Canadians	1,315	16.88%
Métis	1,285	16.50%
English	1,065	13.67%
Irish	680	8.73%
Scottish	640	8.22%
Caucasian (White) (nos}	425	5.46%
European (nos}	270	3.46%
Mi'kmaq (nos}	265	3.40%
German	230	2.95%
Nova Scotian	230	2.95%
British Isles	170	2.18%

Religion (2021)
Religion	Population	Pct (%)
Catholic	4,065	52.15%
No religion and secular perspectives	2,155	27.64%
Baptist	710	9.11%
Christian (nos}	240	3.08%
Methodist and Wesleyan (Holiness)	185	2.37%
Other Christian and Christian-related traditions	145	1.86%
United Church	85	1.09%
Anglican	75	0.09%
Pentecostal and other Charismatic	60	0.07%
Other religions and spiritual traditions	25	0.3%
Jehovah's Witness	15	0.2%

- Education:
  - No certificate, diploma or degree: 29.2%
  - High school certificate: 22.3%
  - Apprenticeship or trade certificate or diploma: 12.6%
  - Community college, CEGEP or other non-university certificate or diploma: 22.5%
  - University certificate or diploma: 13.3%
- Unemployment rate:
  - 12.3%

== Communities ==
- Amiraults Hill
- Argyle
- Argyle Sound
- Central Argyle
- Comeau's Hill
- East Kemptville
- East Pubnico
- East Quinan
- Glenwood
- Hubbard's Point
- Lower Argyle
- Lower East Pubnico
- Lower Eel Brook
- Lower Wedgeport
- Lower West Pubnico
- Middle East Pubnico
- Middle West Pubnico
- Morris Island
- North Belleville
- Plymouth
- Pubnico
- Quinan
- Sluice Point
- South Belleville
- Ste. Anne du Ruisseau
- Surette's Island
- Tusket
- Tusket Falls
- Tusket Islands
- Upper Wedgeport
- Wedgeport
- West Pubnico

== See also ==
- List of francophone communities in Nova Scotia
- List of municipalities in Nova Scotia
