= Chebogue Cemetery =

Old burial ground in Nova Scotia, Canada

Coordinates: 43.777°N 66.098°W

Chebogue Cemetery is the oldest burial ground in Yarmouth County, Nova Scotia, Canada, established in 1771.
