= Carleton, Nova Scotia =

Community in Nova Scotia, Canada

Coordinates: 44°00′31″N 65°55′55″W

Carleton in Nova Scotia

Carleton is a small community in the Canadian province of Nova Scotia, located in Yarmouth County. It is located approximately 26 kilometers northeast of the town of Yarmouth.

The first settler in the area was Daniel Raymond. At one time it was known as "Nine Partners' Falls" owing to nine settlers having formed a partnership to run a mill there. It was also formerly known as "Temperance," owing to the settlers having formed a Temperance compact to eschew all intoxicating liquors. Its present name is in honour of the first Baron of Dorchester, Guy Carleton, who was Commander-in-Chief in America in 1782, afterwards Governor of Quebec, up to 1796.
