= South Ohio =

Community in Nova Scotia, Canada

Coordinates: 43°55′11.66″N 66°3′56.15″W

Ohio in Nova Scotia

South Ohio is a community in the Canadian province of Nova Scotia, located in Yarmouth County.

The area was first settled by Nehemiah and Benjamin Churchill who about the year 1826 decided with a number of other Yarmouth families to go to Ohio, United States. For some reason these two men changed their minds and settled beyond the utmost settler, at what was known as the "Ponds." They gave the name of "Ohio" to their farms, which thus became the name of the settlement.
