= Forest Glen, Nova Scotia =

Community in Nova Scotia, Canada

Coordinates: 44°4′21.15″N 65°54′36.26″W

Forest Glen in Nova Scotia

Forest Glen is a community in the Canadian province of Nova Scotia, located in Yarmouth County. Located north of Godrey Lake, the area was previously part of the Yarmouth township.
