= Greenville, Nova Scotia =

Community in Nova Scotia, Canada

Coordinates: 43°51′45.91″N 66°3′4.24″W

Greenville in Nova Scotia

Greenville is a community in the Canadian province of Nova Scotia, located in the Yarmouth Municipal District in Yarmouth County. In 1820, a colony of Black Loyalist descendants established themselves in the community, which was then known as Salmon River. It is home to the Greenville United Baptist Church, one of the oldest surviving churches erected by the Nova Scotia Black community.
