= Lake Annis =

Lake in Nova Scotia, Canada

- Location within Nova Scotia
- Location: Yarmouth District, Nova Scotia
- Coordinates: 44.056334°N 66.005398°W
- Basin countries: Canada

Lake Annis is a lake of Yarmouth District, in Nova Scotia, Canada. It is at an elevation of about 40 m (130 ft) above sea level and is on the Annis River. The small community of Lake Annis adjacent to the lake.

== See also ==
- List of lakes in Nova Scotia
