= Short Beach, Nova Scotia =

Community in Nova Scotia, Canada

Coordinates: 43°56′20.54″N 66°8′56.8″W

Short Beach in Nova Scotia

Short Beach is a community in the Canadian province of Nova Scotia, located in Yarmouth County. The area had a population of 54 people in 1956.
