= Hebron, Nova Scotia =

Community in Nova Scotia, Canada

Coordinates: 43°53′14″N 66°05′25″W

Hebron in Nova Scotia

Hebron is an unincorporated community in the Canadian province of Nova Scotia, located in Yarmouth County.

The community takes its name from the biblical city of Hebron. Captain Anthony Landers, an early settler and shipbuilder, owned much of the surrounding land and named his residence "Hebron House." The junction of the Ohio Road and the main post road subsequently became known as "Hebron Corner." As the settlement expanded beyond the junction, "Corner" was dropped and the community became known simply as Hebron.

In 1956, Hebron had a population of 440 people.
