= Kelleys Cove =

Community in Nova Scotia, Canada

Coordinates: 43°46′50.74″N 66°6′52.28″W

Kelleys Cove in Nova Scotia

Kelleys Cove is a community in the Canadian province of Nova Scotia, located in Yarmouth County. It was named for Captain James Kelley, an early settler of the area, who arrived from Massachusetts in 1765.
