= Brenton, Nova Scotia =

Community in Nova Scotia, Canada

Coordinates: 43°57′42.07″N 66°3′38.85″W

Brenton in Nova Scotia

Brenton is a community in the Canadian province of Nova Scotia, located in Yarmouth County. The area was likely named in honour of James Brenton, who served as the third attorney general of Nova Scotia from 1779 to 1781.
