= Surettes Island, Nova Scotia =

Community in Nova Scotia, Canada

Coordinates: 43°46′0″N 65°55′59″W

Surettes Island in Nova Scotia

Surettes Island (French: l'Île-des-Surettes) is an island and community in the Canadian province of Nova Scotia, located in the Municipality of the District of Argyle.

== Indian Sluice Point Bridge ==
Surettes Island is connected to Sluice Point on mainland Nova Scotia by the Indian Sluice Point Bridge on Nova Scotia Route 308.

Although priests were not permitted to run for political office, they helped influence legislation by openly favouring a particular candidate, not always of their own denomination, that they felt would best serve the interests of the community. The clergy also helped influence community development, sometimes on a large scale. Father J.B. Depuis (served 1896–1901) and Father J.E. Hamelin (1901–29) were largely responsible for getting the Surettes Island bridge constructed in 1909.

The original structure was replaced by a new bridge in 2012–14 at a cost of $13.5 million. At nearly 190 metres, it is the longest bridge in the county. There was a grand opening on Saturday June 28, 2014 celebrating the new two-lane bridge replacing a one-lane structure that opened more than a century earlier.
