= Overton, Nova Scotia =

Community in Nova Scotia, Canada

Coordinates: 43°50′41″N 66°08′30″W

Overton in Nova Scotia

Overton is a community in the Canadian province of Nova Scotia, located in Yarmouth County. The community is situated approximately 1 kilometre (0.62 miles) northwest of the town of Yarmouth.

The name "Overton" is descriptive, referring to its location across (over) the harbour from the town of Yarmouth. The Mi'kmaq referred to the area as Malegeak, meaning "fretful water".
