= Raynardton =

Community in Nova Scotia, Canada

Coordinates: 43°55′25.68″N 65°57′27.44″W

Raynardton in Nova Scotia

Raynardton is a community in the Canadian province of Nova Scotia, located in Yarmouth County. The area was settled by Acadian families from Tusket who fled the area during the deportation of the Acadians, beginning in 1755. Raynardton had a population of 74 people in 1956.

The Raynardton Free Baptist Church was erected in 1897–1898, and is recognized as a municipal heritage building. The church is one of three remaining Free Baptist Churches in Nova Scotia.
