= Cape Forchu Lighthouse =

Lighthouse in Nova Scotia, Canada

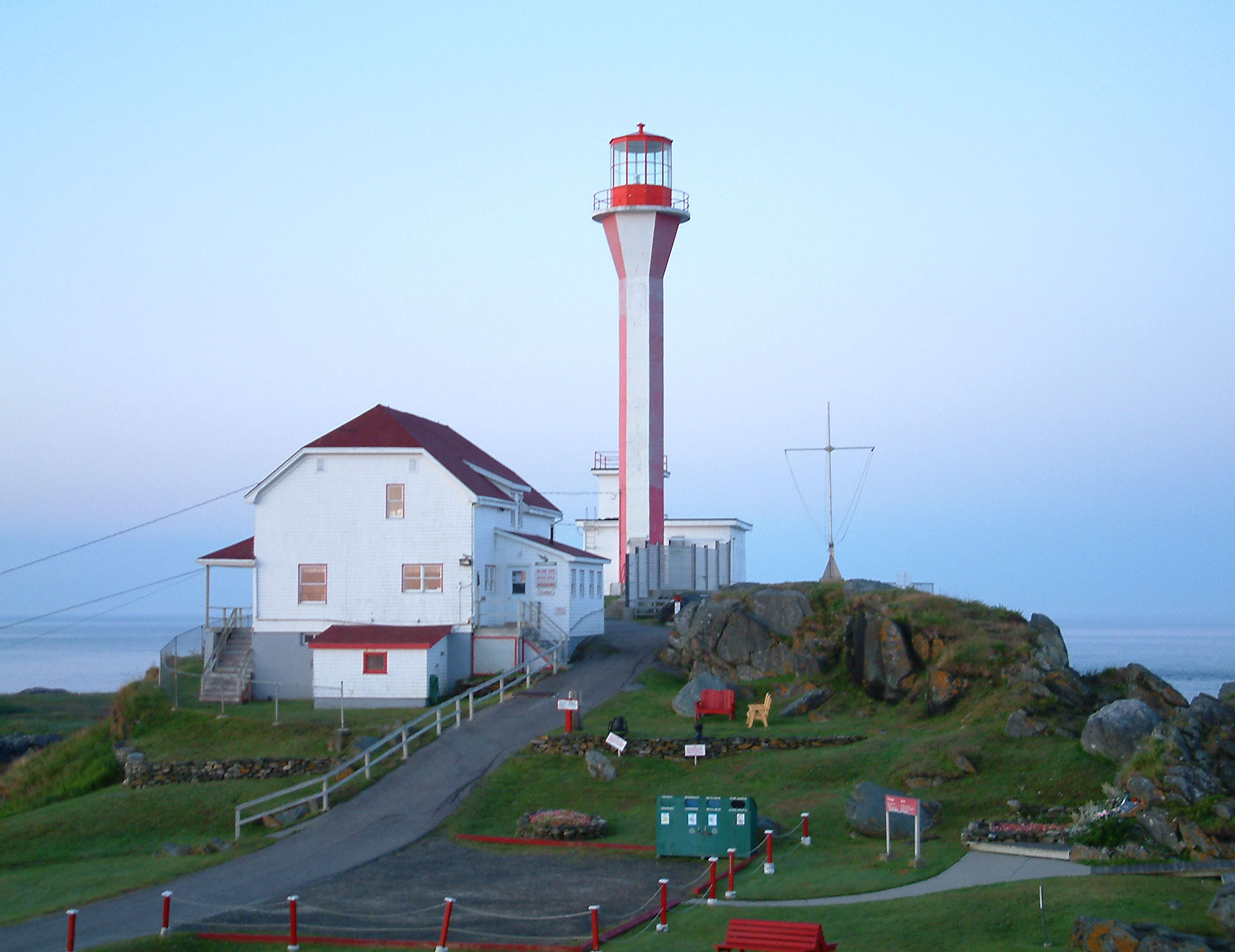
- Cape Forchu Lighthouse
- Location: Cape Forchu; Nova Scotia; Canada
- Coordinates: 43°48′25″N 66°9′30″W

Tower
- Constructed: 1839 (Original Lighthouse) 1961 (Current Lighthouse)
- Construction: reinforced concrete tower
- Height: 27.7 metres (91 ft) (first); 30 metres (98 ft) (current)
- Shape: hexagonal tower with balcony and lantern
- Markings: tower with white and red vertical stripes, red balcony and lantern
- Heritage: Municipally Registered Property, Provincially Registered Property

Light
- First lit: 1840 (Original Lighthouse) 1962 (Current Lighthouse)
- Focal height: 38.4 metres (126 ft) (first); 35 metres (115 ft) (current)
- Lens: second order Fresnel lens
- Intensity: 1,000,000 candela
- Range: 30 nautical miles (56 km; 35 mi)
- Characteristic: Fl W 14s.

The Cape Forchu Lighthouse is located in Cape Forchu, Nova Scotia, Canada. The lighthouse is located 11 km from Yarmouth, Nova Scotia.

== History ==
The lighthouse was constructed in 1839 and was operational in 1840. The original station was demolished in 1961 and replaced in 1962 with the "apple core" tower. Since 2000, the original Fresnel lens used at the lighthouse is located at the Yarmouth County Museum.

The surrounding 19 acres (7.7 ha) of rocky headland contain the Leif Erikson Park, which offers a scenic walking trail with ocean views.

On June 1, 2000, it became the first operating light station in Canadian history to be transferred to a municipality from the Department of Fisheries and Oceans, through the Department's Alternative Use Program. In exchange for the delivery of services it was transferred to the Municipality of the District of Yarmouth for one dollar. It became a registered Heritage property of the Municipality in 2001 and of the province of Nova Scotia in 2003.

== Current day ==
The 19 acres of ground the lighthouse is on is open to the public year-round. The light keeper's house is a Heritage property that is open from May to September and houses The Keeper's Kitchen restaurant and a gift shop.

In 2018, The Lighthouse, a feature film starring Willem Dafoe and Robert Pattinson, was filmed in the park.

The original lighthouse, demolished in 1961, was featured on a postage stamp in 2022, one of five Vintage Travel Posters stamps issued on June 9. The stamps had been planned for release in 2020, but were twice delayed due to the COVID-19 pandemic. The stamp shows the old lighthouse as it appears on a 1950 poster designed by Peter Ewart, promoting “Canada’s Picturesque East Coast” for Canadian Pacific.

== See also ==
- List of lighthouses in Canada
