= Port Maitland, Nova Scotia =

Community in Nova Scotia, Canada

Coordinates: 43°59′3.01″N 66°9′3.29″W

Port Maitland in Nova Scotia

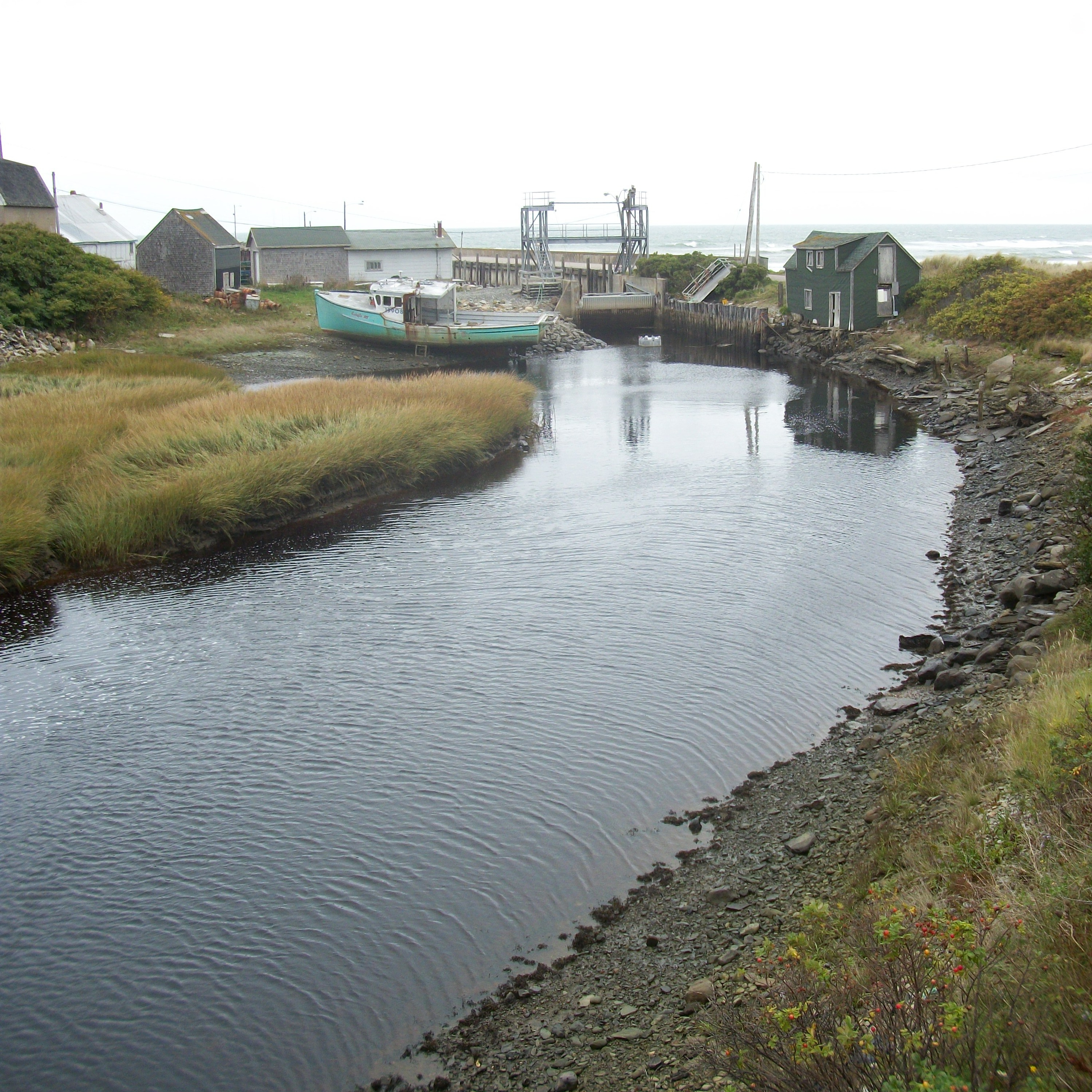
Port Maitland

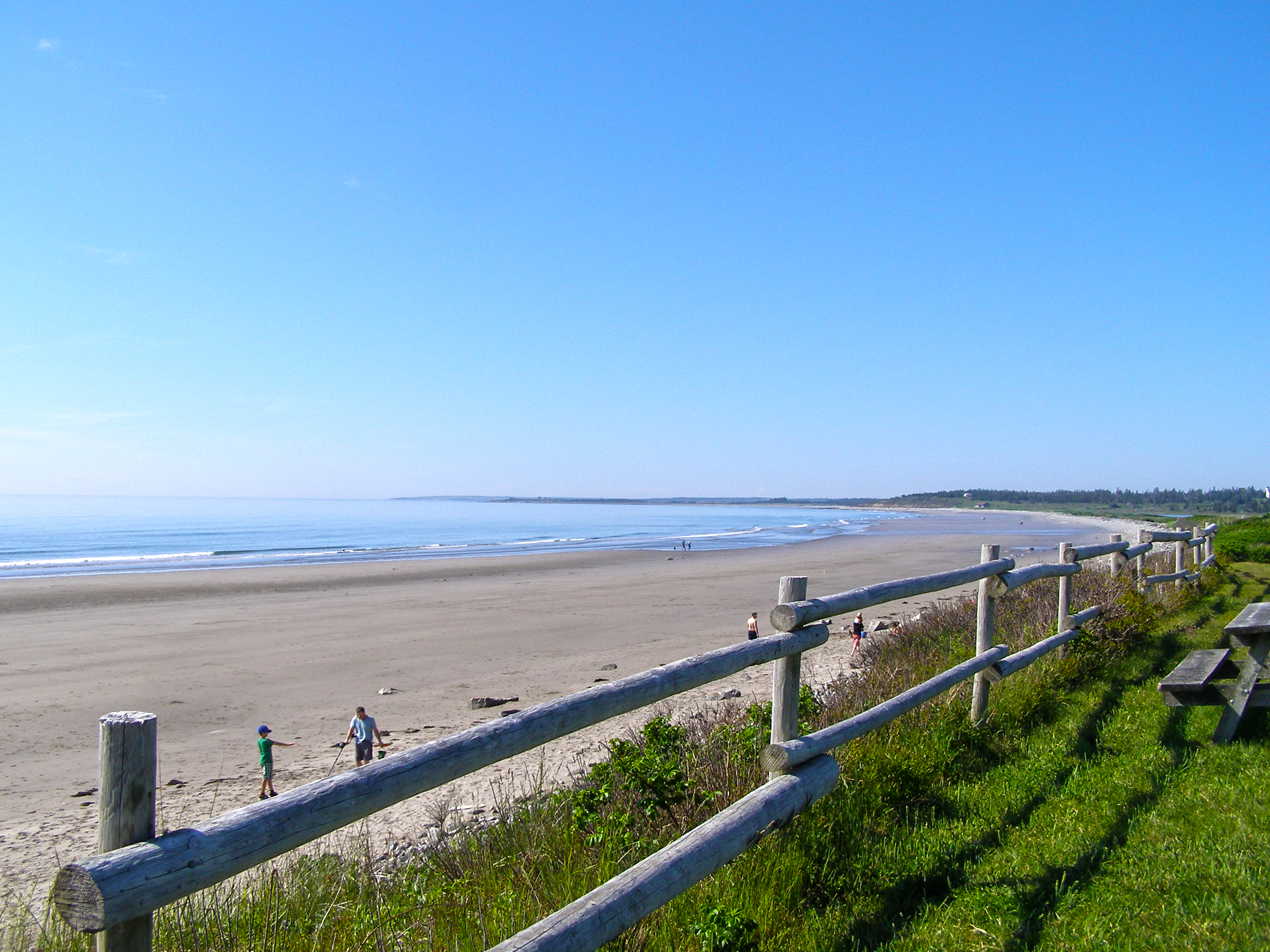
Port Maitland Beach

Port Maitland (population: 503) is a small community in the Canadian province of Nova Scotia, located in Yarmouth County. It is near the town of Yarmouth, and very near to the community of Beaver River. Salmon River also very nearby, lies within Digby County. The community covers 81.46 km^{2} (31.45 sq mi).

== History ==
Early settlement The community was first called Green Cove. In 1869, it was renamed Port Maitland to honour Sir Peregrine Maitland, who had been Lieutenant Governor of Nova Scotia from 1828 to 1834. Another village in Hants County also chose the name Maitland, so this community added "Port" because it had a harbour. Joseph Sollows (1790-1869) was one of the first people to settle in Port Maitland. He built a house, raised six children, and started a general store. He also built a breakwater to protect his fishing boat, "The Sea Rover." Many people with the Sollows last name in Port Maitland today are related to Joseph. In 1820, a large fire destroyed homes in the nearby community of Beaver River. Many families who lost their homes moved to Port Maitland and started over. This helped the village grow.

Religion and culture

Port Maitland was strongly influenced by Henry Alline's New Light Baptist movement in the late 1700s. Both Port Maitland and nearby Beaver River became mostly Baptist and English in heritage. The village is close to the Acadian French-speaking, Catholic municipality of Clare in Digby County, and to historically Black communities like Hectanooga. The Calvinist Baptist Cemetery is one of three old cemeteries maintained by the Oldstones Society. These cemeteries hold the graves of many founding families.

Shipbuilding

Eleazer Raymond opened the first shipyard in Port Maitland. Between 1860 and 1889, his shipyard built 28 ships. The shipbuilding industry began to decline in 1919. The last sailing ship was a four-masted schooner called "The Breakers."

Fishing industry

Fishing has always been important to Port Maitland. The lobster fishery became the most profitable business in the area. In 1890, Atwood Ellis, James Rogers, and George Rogers started catching lobsters commercially. At first, they set traps near shore and pulled them by hand. When boats got gas engines, fishermen could go farther out to sea. By 1947, local fishermen were using 9,000 lobster traps. The Department of Fisheries then started conservation rules to protect the lobster population.

Maritime facilities

In 1884, the government built a lighthouse on the pier to help ships and fishing boats find the harbour safely. Walter Sollows was the first lighthouse keeper and earned just over $50 per year. The lighthouse was rebuilt several times. The wooden tower was destroyed in 1945 and replaced with a white pole. Today, a modern light still marks the harbour.

A cattle pound was built around 1871 to hold stray cattle. It is a square stone wall enclosure built next to a brook. The Port Maitland Cattle Pound is now a heritage site and may be the last remaining cattle pound in Yarmouth County.

== Present day ==
Along the Evangeline Trail, which is also Nova Scotia Trunk 1, there are three restored cemeteries maintained by the Old Beaver River and Port Maitland Cemeteries Preservation Society (also known as the Old Stones Society).

== Neighbourhoods ==
Twin Lake Properties – residential, high-income properties

== Port Maitland Provincial Park ==
There is a provincial park on Port Maitland Beach, which is easily reached from the community. The park features a large sandy beach, several shaded picnic tables and bathroom facilities. Lifeguards are on duty. It is one of the few remaining beaches in Nova Scotia that allows you to walk your dog on a leash. There is a sign by the beach with a picture of a dog on a leash.
