= Municipality of the District of Yarmouth =

Yarmouth
- District municipality
- Municipality of the District of Yarmouth
- Flag Seal
- Motto: Justice and Prudence
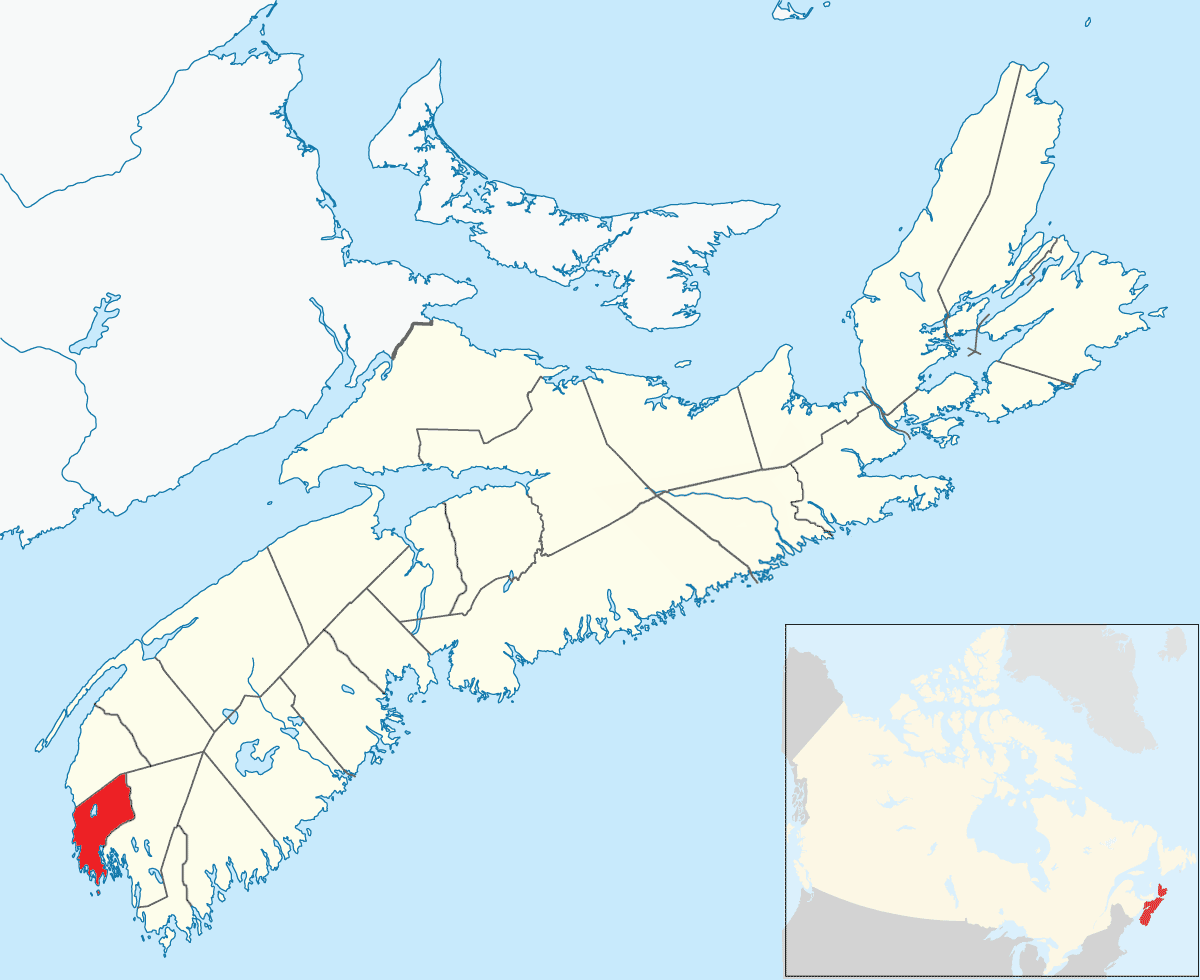
- Location of the Municipality of the District of Yarmouth
- Coordinates: 43°57′00″N 66°01′58″W
- Country: Canada
- Province: Nova Scotia
- County: Yarmouth
- Incorporated: April 17, 1879
- Electoral Districts Federal: Acadie—Annapolis
- Provincial: Yarmouth

Government
  - Type: Municipal Council
  - Municipal Seat: Hebron

Area (2021)
  - Land: 584.69 km^{2} (225.75 sq mi)

Population (2021)
  - Total: 10,067
  - Density: 17.2/km^{2} (45/sq mi)
  - Change 2016-2021: ▲2.3%
- Time zone: UTC−04:00 (AST)
  - Summer (DST): UTC−03:00 (ADT)
- Area code: 902
- Dwellings: 4,981
- Median Income*: $44,323 CDN
- Website: Official website
- Median household income, 2005 (all households)

Yarmouth, officially named the Municipality of the District of Yarmouth, is a district municipality in Yarmouth County, Nova Scotia, Canada. Statistics Canada classifies the district municipality as a municipal district.

The district municipality forms the western part of Yarmouth County. It is one of three municipal units in the county, the other two being the Town of Yarmouth and the Municipality of the District of Argyle.

== Demographics ==
Historical population
Year	Pop.	±%
1961	6,935	—
1966	7,104	+2.4%
1971	7,640	+7.5%
1976	8,767	+14.8%
1981	9,842	+12.3%
1986	10,380	+5.5%
1991	10,827	+4.3%
1996	10,722	−1.0%
2001	10,476	−2.3%
2006	10,304	−1.6%
2011	10,105	−1.9%
2016	9,845	−2.6%
2021	10,067	+2.3%
Source: Statistics Canada

In the 2021 Canadian census conducted by Statistics Canada, the Municipality of the District of Yarmouth had a population of 10,067 living in 4,430 of its 5,072 total private dwellings, a change of 2.3% from its 2016 population of 9,845. With a land area of 584.69 km^{2} (225.75 sq mi), it had a population density of 17.2/km^{2} (44.6/sq mi) in 2021.

Mother tongue language (2021)
Language	Population	Pct (%)
English	8,985	90.0%
French	740	7.4%
Non-official languages	105	1.1%
English and French	140	1.4%

Ethnic groups (2021) (Note: Top ten responses)
Ethnic / cultural origin	Population	Pct (%)
English	2,485	25.0%
Acadians	1,855	18.7%
French (nos} (Note: There were 60 French Canadians or 0.6% of the population)	1,650	16.6%
Canadians	1,620	16.3%
Scottish	1,460	14.7%
Irish	1,285	12.9%
Métis	1,065	10.7%
Caucasian (White) (nos}	980	9.9%
German	645	6.5%
European (nos}	535	5.4%

There are 530 Indigenous Canadians, other than Métis, which accounts for 5.4% of the population. There are 200 (2.0%) Mi'kmaq (nos}, 130 (1.3%) First Nations (nos}, 85 (0.9%) North American Indigenous (nos}, 70 (0.7%) Inuit (nos}, 20 (0.2%) Blackfoot (nos}, 15 (0.2%) Mohawk, and 10 (0.1%) Ojibway.

Religion (2021)
Religion	Population	Pct (%)
No religion and secular perspectives	3,745	37.7%
Catholic	2,570	25.8%
Baptist	1,580	15.9%
Christian (nos}	540	5.4%
Anglican	295	3.0%
Methodist and Wesleyan (Holiness)	295	3.0%
United Church	280	2.8%
Other Christian and Christian-related traditions	220	2.2%
Pentecostal and other Charismatic	35	0.35%
Jehovah's Witness	85	0.9%

- Education:
  - No certificate, diploma or degree: 22.3%
  - High school certificate: 25.2%
  - Apprenticeship or trade certificate or diploma: 10.0%
  - Community college, CEGEP or other non-university certificate or diploma: 27.4%
  - University certificate or diploma: 15.1%
- Unemployment rate:
  - 12.9%

== Communities ==
Communities include:

- Arcadia
- Cape Forchu
- Chegoggin
- Chebogue
- Greenville
- John's Cove
- Kemptville
- Port Maitland
- Quinan
- Roberts Island
- Surette's Island

== Climate ==
Climate data is from Yarmouth Airport which is located 15 km (9.3 mi) south of the geographical coordinates of the municipality.

Yarmouth has a humid continental climate (Köppen: Dfb), closely bordering on an oceanic climate (Köppen: Cfb), typical of climates surrounded by the sea but close to large continents such as southern Norway and coastal Hokkaido but with latitude variations. Being near the -3 °C isotherm in the average of the coldest month (east of the city), causing that in peninsular areas like Yarmouth Bar and Cape Forchu are between a transition band for the oceanic climates (Cfb). Winters are cool and rainy with a January average of −2.6 °C (27.3 °F) though owing to strong maritime influences, temperatures below −20 °C (−4 °F) are very rare, and the average high never drops to below freezing at any point in the year. During this period of time, the weather can be unsettled and cloudy due to the Nor'easters coming up the coast from the southwest. As a result, Yarmouth averages only 68–100 hours of sunshine from December to February or 25%–34% of possible sunshine. The average annual snowfall is 204.7 cm (80.6 in), which can come from Nor'easters from the southwest with a maximum snow depth of 9 cm (3.5 in) in January, owing to its mild winters, among the mildest in Canada east of the Rockies.

Yarmouth's summers are cool due to the strong coastal influence from the sea which keeps summer temperatures cool, meaning temperatures above 30 °C (86 °F) are very rare. The average temperature in the warmest month, August is 17.5 °C (63.5 °F). Spring and fall are transitional seasons in which falls are warmer than spring since the waters are at the warmest temperatures in fall and the coldest during early spring. Precipitation is significant, averaging 1,290.1 mm (50.79 in) a year, with July and August the driest months on average and November the wettest month on average. An outstanding feature is Yarmouth's late-fall to early-winter precipitation maximum, owing to the combination of intense storm activity from November to January and relatively more-stable summers, with thunderstorm activity here much less frequent than in the U.S. Northeast, Mid-Atlantic and points southward. Yarmouth averages 1,898.3 hours of sunshine or 41.2% of possible sunshine with summer being the sunniest and winter being the cloudiest. Yarmouth averages 191 days of fog each year.

The highest temperature ever recorded in Yarmouth was 32.5 °C (90.5 °F) on July 16, 2013. The coldest temperature ever recorded was −24.4 °C (−11.9 °F) on February 14, 1894.

Climate data for Yarmouth (Yarmouth Airport) WMO ID: 71603; coordinates 43°49′37″N 66°05′17″W; elevation: 42.9 m (141 ft); 1991–2020 normals, extremes 1870−present (Note: Climate data was recorded in the town of Yarmouth from December 1870 to March 1941 and at Yarmouth Airport from February 1940 to present. Climate data 1991–2020 is a composite recorded at Yarmouth A, Yarmouth RCS (WMO ID: – / 71884; Climate ID: 8206500 / 8206491; coordinates 43°49′51″N 66°05′19″W / 43°49′51″N 66°05′17″W; elevation: 43.0 m (141.1 ft) / 36.0 m (118.1 ft)), and Yarmouth A (WMO ID: 71603; Climate ID: 8206495; coordinates 43°49′37″N 66°05′17″W; elevation: 42.9 m (141 ft)))
Month	Jan	Feb	Mar	Apr	May	Jun	Jul	Aug	Sep	Oct	Nov	Dec	Year
Record high humidex	15.8	16.9	17.4	24.8	27.9	38.0	37.7	37.3	36.4	30.2	26.1	19.5	38.0
Record high °C (°F)	14.0 (57.2)	15.3 (59.5)	18.3 (64.9)	21.2 (70.2)	24.8 (76.6)	30.4 (86.7)	32.5 (90.5)	30.3 (86.5)	27.7 (81.9)	22.8 (73.0)	19.3 (66.7)	16.5 (61.7)	32.5 (90.5)
Mean daily maximum °C (°F)	1.3 (34.3)	1.3 (34.3)	4.0 (39.2)	8.8 (47.8)	13.9 (57.0)	18.1 (64.6)	21.4 (70.5)	21.6 (70.9)	18.8 (65.8)	13.6 (56.5)	9.0 (48.2)	4.4 (39.9)	11.4 (52.5)
Daily mean °C (°F)	−2.6 (27.3)	−2.5 (27.5)	0.4 (32.7)	5.0 (41.0)	9.8 (49.6)	14.0 (57.2)	17.3 (63.1)	17.5 (63.5)	14.7 (58.5)	9.8 (49.6)	5.5 (41.9)	0.8 (33.4)	7.5 (45.5)
Mean daily minimum °C (°F)	−6.4 (20.5)	−6.2 (20.8)	−3.3 (26.1)	1.2 (34.2)	5.7 (42.3)	9.8 (49.6)	13.2 (55.8)	13.4 (56.1)	10.5 (50.9)	6.1 (43.0)	1.9 (35.4)	−2.9 (26.8)	3.6 (38.5)
Record low °C (°F)	−21.3 (−6.3)	−24.4 (−11.9)	−15.7 (3.7)	−10.8 (12.6)	−1.8 (28.8)	2.1 (35.8)	6.4 (43.5)	5.8 (42.4)	1.3 (34.3)	−3.2 (26.2)	−9.8 (14.4)	−16.6 (2.1)	−24.4 (−11.9)
Record low wind chill	−32.6	−32.0	−28.5	−22.5	−4.3	0.0	0.0	0.0	0.0	−6.9	−19.5	−28.2	−32.6
Average precipitation mm (inches)	123.6 (4.87)	102.8 (4.05)	110.7 (4.36)	101.4 (3.99)	99.1 (3.90)	88.7 (3.49)	78.0 (3.07)	88.1 (3.47)	95.9 (3.78)	119.3 (4.70)	143.4 (5.65)	139.1 (5.48)	1,290.1 (50.79)
Average rainfall mm (inches)	69.1 (2.72)	60.0 (2.36)	82.5 (3.25)	92.7 (3.65)	98.5 (3.88)	88.9 (3.50)	81.8 (3.22)	89.8 (3.54)	97.5 (3.84)	124.1 (4.89)	133.8 (5.27)	97.8 (3.85)	1,116.5 (43.96)
Average snowfall cm (inches)	63.6 (25.0)	46.5 (18.3)	30.8 (12.1)	9.5 (3.7)	0.2 (0.1)	0.0 (0.0)	0.0 (0.0)	0.0 (0.0)	0.0 (0.0)	0.4 (0.2)	10.0 (3.9)	43.7 (17.2)	204.7 (80.6)
Average precipitation days (≥ 0.2 mm)	20.5	16.4	14.9	13.9	13.4	11.6	9.9	9.8	10.1	12.1	15.1	19.7	167.2
Average rainy days (≥ 0.2 mm)	8.5	7.0	8.8	12.3	13.3	11.5	10.2	9.7	10.4	11.8	13.4	12.2	128.9
Average snowy days (≥ 0.2 cm)	15.5	12.0	9.0	3.1	0.1	0.0	0.0	0.0	0.0	0.2	3.1	10.2	53.2
Average relative humidity (%) (at 1500 LST)	77.8	74.1	70.3	70.3	73.4	76.7	78.7	77.1	75.4	73.0	74.5	77.3	74.9
Mean monthly sunshine hours	76.0	103.5	141.6	178.8	213.0	217.6	227.6	220.0	186.8	165.6	97.6	70.3	1,898.3
Percentage possible sunshine	26.3	35.0	38.4	44.4	46.7	47.1	48.6	50.8	49.6	48.4	33.5	25.3	41.2
Source: Environment and Climate Change Canada (extreme minimum February 1894) (sun from 1981-2010)

== See also ==
- List of francophone communities in Nova Scotia
- List of municipalities in Nova Scotia
- Royal eponyms in Canada
