= Springhaven, Nova Scotia =

Community in Nova Scotia, Canada

Coordinates: 43°54′11.56″N 65°52′6.09″W

Springhaven in Nova Scotia

Springhaven is a community in the Canadian province of Nova Scotia, located in Yarmouth County. The name of the area was likely inspired by R. D. Blackmore's 1887 novel Springhaven.
