= Belleville, Nova Scotia =

Community in Nova Scotia, Canada

Coordinates: 43°52′1.95″N 65°56′5.25″W

Belleville in Nova Scotia

Belleville is a community in the Canadian province of Nova Scotia, located in Yarmouth County. Several Acadian families settled in the area in 1788.
