= Kemptville, Nova Scotia =

Community in Nova Scotia, Canada

Coordinates: 44°2′52″N 65°50′0″W

Kemptville in Nova Scotia

Kemptville is a rural community in the Canadian province of Nova Scotia, located in the Yarmouth Municipal District and Yarmouth County. It is located approximately 38 kilometers northeast of the town of Yarmouth.

It is a popular location for sport fishing due to its many rivers and lakes.

== Etymology ==
Kemptville is named after General Sir James Kempt, who served as Lieutenant-Governor of Nova Scotia from 1820 to 1828, about the time this area was first settled by Europeans.

== History ==
The settlement of Kemptville began with Abner Andrews, the son of Major Samuel Andrews, a British Loyalist originally from North Carolina. Andrews moved to the area from Tusket, Nova Scotia, and was later followed by his brothers Nathan and David Andrews as well as James Hurlburt. Other families later came from various corners of Yarmouth County such as Yarmouth Township, Shelburne and Argyle, in addition to a smaller number of families from England and the United States of America.
