= Amiraults Hill, Nova Scotia =

Community in Nova Scotia, Canada

Coordinates: 43°48′44.04″N 65°58′50.87″W

Amirault's Hill in Nova Scotia

Amiraults Hill (French: Buttes-Amirault) is a community in the Canadian province of Nova Scotia, located in Argyle Municipality.

== History ==
This community recalls the resilience of the Acadian People, who returned in numbers to Nova Scotia following the expulsion of 1755. Nearby Pubnico was an important Acadian settlement both before and following the expulsion, for this was one area where the lands had not been confiscated by others. As the population of settlements such as Pubnico expanded, the settlers moved farther along the shore. Around 1800, Jacques Amirault, son of Jacques, of Pubnico settled in the district which bears his name.
