= Sluice Point, Nova Scotia =

Community in Nova Scotia, Canada

Coordinates: 43°47′6.58″N 65°57′24.51″W

Sluice Point in Nova Scotia

Sluice Point (French: Pointe du Sault) is a community in the Canadian province of Nova Scotia, located in the Argyle Municipality in Yarmouth County.

== Education ==
The school started with the primary department in 1870. There was opposition to both the school and the Indian Sluice Point Bridge (to Surette's Island). Education was not well understood then, and one man, Jacques Babin, stubbornly affirmed that no bridge or school would be built while he was alive. In the primary department there were about twenty-five seats. It was big enough at that time, but the population increased, so they built the advanced department in 1902.

== Climate ==
Sluice Point

Climate chart (precipitation, max. and min. temperature)
J	F	M	A	M	J	J	A	S	O	N	D
127 1 −7	102 1 −7	116 6 −2	101 12 2	101 19 8	90 24 13	84 27 16	80 28 17	93 23 12	112 16 7	139 10 3	132 5 −3
- █ Average max. and min. temperatures in °C
- █ Precipitation totals in mm
- Source: The Weather Company
Imperial conversion
J	F	M	A	M	J	J	A	S	O	N	D
5 34 19	4 35 20	4.5 43 28	4 53 35	4 66 46	3.5 76 55	3.3 81 61	3.2 82 62	3.7 73 54	4.4 60 44	5.5 49 37	5.2 40 26
- █ Average max. and min. temperatures in °F
- █ Precipitation totals in inches

Sluice Point lies on a climatic zone known as a humid continental climate (Köppen climate classification Dfb). Winters are cool and snowy or rainy with a January average of −4.3 °C (24.3 °F), temperatures below −20 °C (−4.0 °F) are rare for the area, and the average high never drops to below freezing at any point in the year. During this period of time, the weather can be unsettled and cloudy due to the Nor'easters coming up the coast from the southwest, however in the past few years there has been an absence of snowfall. As a result, Sluice Point averages only 85–170 hours of sunshine from December to February or 36%–44% of possible sunshine. The average annual snowfall is 207 centimetres (81 in), which can come from Nor'easters from the southwest with a maximum snow depth of 7 centimetres (3 in) in January, owing to its mild winters, among the mildest in Canada east of the Rockies.

Sluice Point's summers are warm due to the woodlands which keeps summer temperatures warm, meaning temperatures above 25 °C (77.0 °F) are common. The average high temperature in the warmest month, August is 27.9 °C (82.2 °F). Spring and fall are transitional seasons in which falls are warmer than spring since the waters are at the warmest temperatures in fall and the coldest during early spring. July and August the driest months on average and November the wettest month on average.

Forestry one might find out and about in Sluice Point, Canada.

The highest temperature ever recorded in Sluice Point was 36.3 °C (97.3 °F) on 2 August 2016.
