= Arcadia, Nova Scotia =

Community in Nova Scotia, Canada

Coordinates: 43°49′29.52″N 66°4′24.58″W

Arcadia in Nova Scotia

Arcadia is a small community in the Canadian province of Nova Scotia, adjacent to the town of Yarmouth. It was originally known as "Upper Chebogue" from its location on the upper reaches of the tidal Chebogue River. The name was changed to Arcadia in 1863. While the word itself may be traced back to the Greek name for a land of peace and contentment (see Arcadia (utopia)), the place name was suggested by the ship "Arcadia" built and launched there in 1817.
