= Gavelton, Nova Scotia =

Community in Nova Scotia, Canada

Coordinates: 43°53′50.85″N 65°56′50.36″W

Gavelton in Nova Scotia

Gavelton is a community in the Canadian province of Nova Scotia, located in Yarmouth County.

Gavelton was likely named after John Gavel, who was among the Loyalists who settled in the area in 1786.
