= Chebogue, Nova Scotia =

Fishing village in Nova Scotia, Canada

Coordinates: 43°47′23″N 66°05′20″W

Chebogue in Nova Scotia

Chebogue (/ʃiːˈboʊɡə/) (formerly spelled Jebogue) is a small fishing village situated above the marshes of the Chebogue River in Yarmouth County, Nova Scotia. Farming and fishing are the two main resources in the area.

Sometimes found as "Jeboque," from the Mi'kmaq words "che" (great) and "paug" (still water). Another authority says the name is from the Mi'kmaq word "Utkubok" or spring water, or "Teceboque" meaning cold water. It was permanently settled in 1761, but an unsuccessful attempt at settlement was made by some French in the year 1739.

During the American Revolution, in the Battle off Yarmouth in 1777, the Royal Navy drove an American privateer vessel aground near Chebogue River, and the ship's prisoners escaped into the village.
