= West Pubnico =

Community in Nova Scotia, Canada

Coordinates: 43°40′23.27″N 65°47′50.42″W

West Pubnico in Nova Scotia

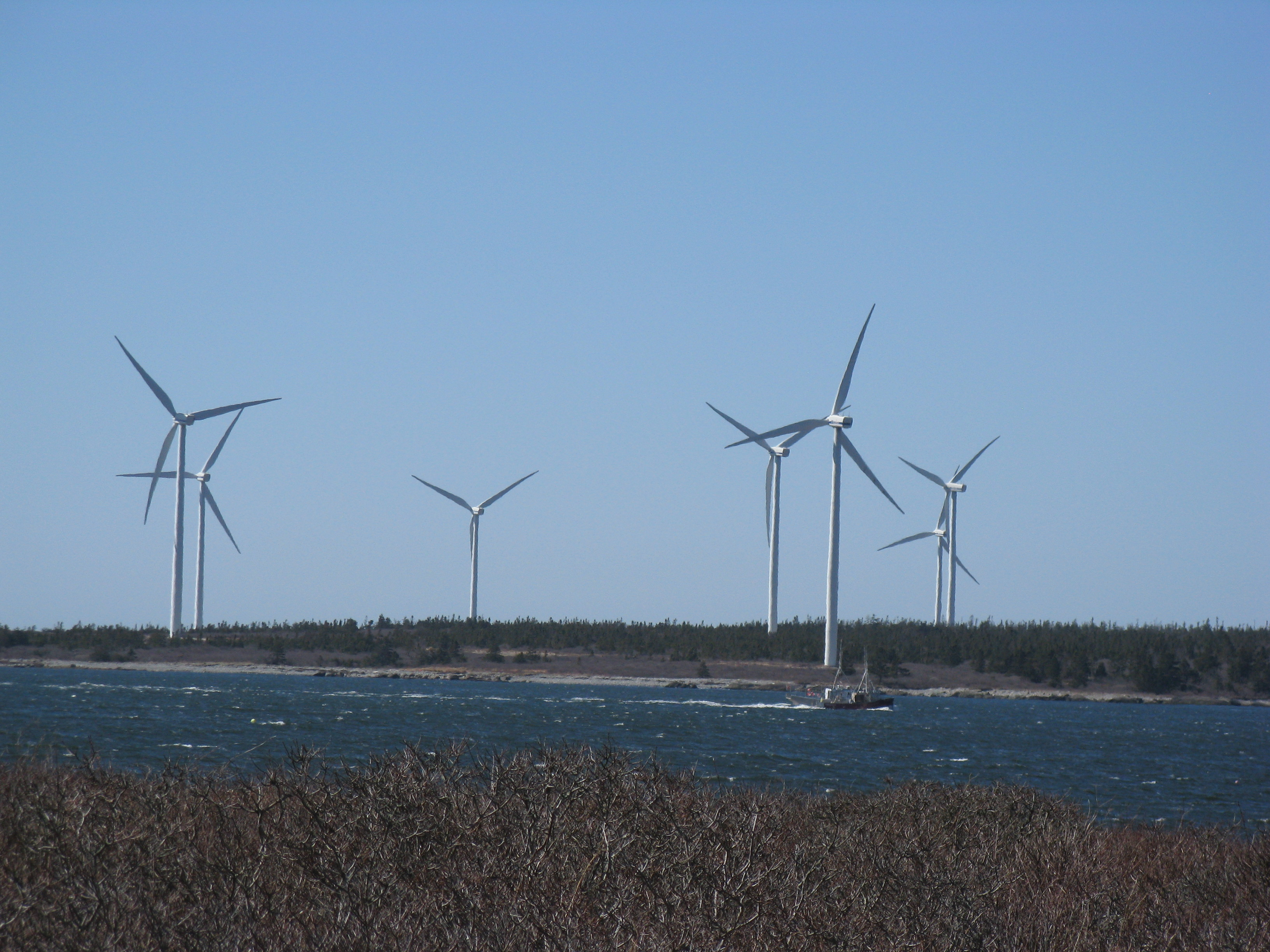
Pubnico Point wind farm

West Pubnico or Pubnico-Ouest is a small Acadian fishing village located 42 km from Yarmouth, Nova Scotia on Nova Scotia Route 335.

West Pubnico is one of the top fishing ports in Nova Scotia by value of landings, and is home to 15 fish processing companies. They include Nova's Finest Fisheries Inc., Inshore Fisheries Limited and Acadian Fish Processors Ltd. Major species include haddock, cod, redfish, herring, and lobster. Nearby Pubnico Point is the site of a wind farm which supplies electricity to the provincial power grid. It was the first wind farm to be built in Nova Scotia. Pubnico also has a variety of tourist locations such as Le village historique Acadien de Poubcoup and also the Pubnico Acadian museum.
