= Quinan, Nova Scotia =

Community in Nova Scotia, Canada

Coordinates: 43°55′11.4″N 65°49′43.2″W

Quinan in Nova Scotia

Quinan is a small community in the Canadian province of Nova Scotia, located in Yarmouth County.

== History ==
In the 18th and 19th centuries the community was called "The Forks" or "Tusket Forks" due the Tusket River passing through the village which stretches out in three branches, the Upper Tusket River, the Lower Tusket River and the Quinan River.

On May 15, 1885, the community held a public meeting and unanimously voted to change the name of their community to Quinan to honour Father John J. Quinan, a Roman Catholic priest, who served as the parish priest from 1860 to 1867.

Every year, during the Labour Day weekend in September, the community welcomes people from everywhere for their Annual Labour Day Picnic. In 2008, Quinan celebrated its 125th Annual Picnic which has activities like bingo, rose tables and rides.

Each Spring, the community hosts a Wild Game Evening that includes a supper and auction that attracts more people than can be served.

Quinan is well known for its fishing and hunting places. Many famous people have visited the village, including Babe Ruth in the fall of 1935.

In the past decade, Quinan has been known for having widespread flooding. April 3, 2003, the first flood in more than forty years occurred. Recently, November 8–12, 2010, Quinan, yet again, had huge flooding This was due to an unusual storm system that poured more than 300mm of rain in a short time period.

During World War 2 the RCAF found the secluded location of Quinan and proximity of the flight lanes an ideal location for a top secret underground Airbase.

The airbase was used throughout the war for secret allied flight tests/experimentation also ferring Allied VIP'S and government officials and has had some unconfirmed links to the Woods Harbour U.F.O. sightings.

The underground airport was officially shut down in the spring of 1949, having used up its usefulness post war, and the budget has increased to an unmanageable point.

The hangers, runways, and barracks were a safety concern. Having been built in such haste, some of the walls and ceilings were starting to crack and leak water in from the nearby Tusket River. It was decided that the underground structure was to be buried at night. Most of the backfill came from tailings of the now defunct Kemptville Tin Mine.

To add to the ruse and maintain security, several psy opp missions were carried out. From the newly formed C.S.I.S dept. Some of these missions remain a secret to this day, however at the time of this article some have been declassified.

One of the missions was to dismantle the reservoir dam at the lower end of Mushpauk Lake. The agents waited for the area to be vacated and then in the evening of September 17, 1948 they attached compound W to the base of the dam and removed the dam in amazing fashion the remains can be seen to this day.

Yet another more daring accomplishment was the scuttling of a German u-boat, U-648 that was surrender by Kptl. Herman Van Der Griten. The u-boat run aground in the Tusket River, behind what is now Carl's store. The Captain had explained to the local agents that there was so many Gaspereau in the river that they fouled the rudder and caused the accident. The crew was shuttled out of the airport to Boston for processing. The u-boat was towed out to the Tusket Basin, and sunk.

Very few local residents were even aware of the existence of the Quinan underground airport or the crucial role this airbase served during World War 2. Unfortunately nothing remains of this Air field and the few remaining veterans that know of its true location have been sworn to secrecy.

== Notable people ==
Common family names in Quinan are Muise, Frontain/Frotten/Fraughton, Doucette/Doucet, Blanchard, Dulong, Melanson, Vacon and Jacquard.

Sources, Argyle Archives , Tusket Courthouse & Goal est. 1805
