= Tusket =

Community in Nova Scotia, Canada

Coordinates: 43°51′20″N 65°58′28″W

Tusket in Nova Scotia

Tusket is a community in the Canadian province of Nova Scotia, located in Yarmouth County.

== History ==
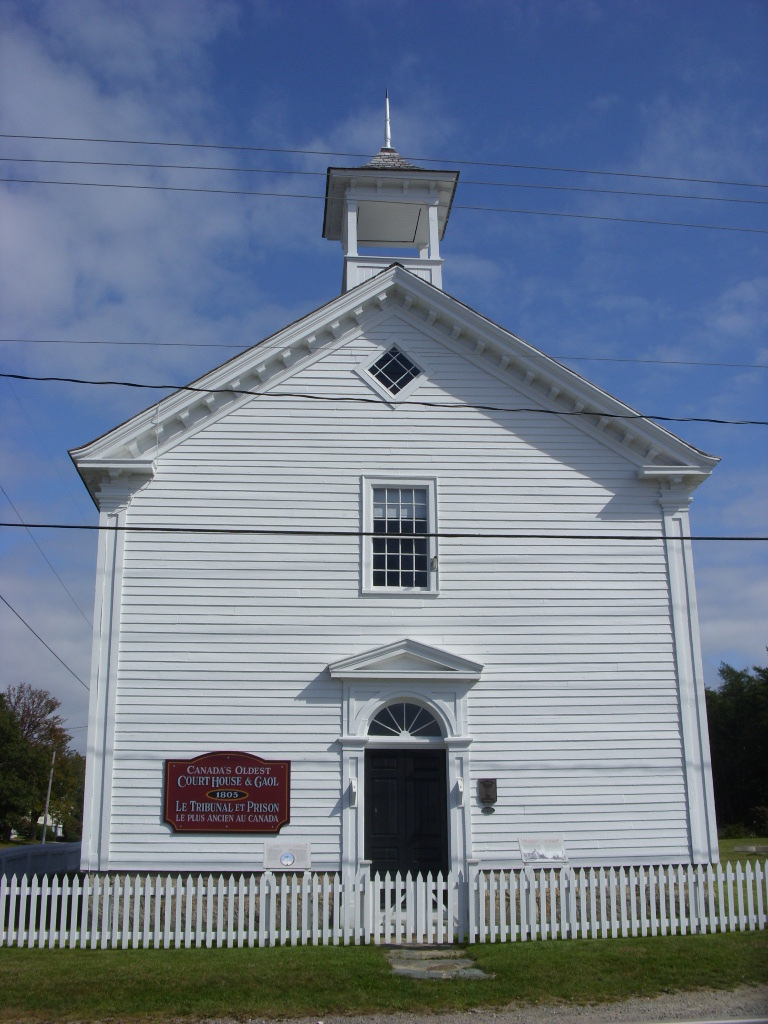
Tusket Township Courthouse and Gaol, the oldest extant in Canada

"Neketaouksit", the Miꞌkmaq word for the "Great Forked Tidal River", evolved to what is now called Tusket. The village was originally settled by Acadians before the British launched the Cape Sable campaign. Afterwards the community was also settled by Dutch colonial empire United Empire Loyalists from New York and New Jersey in 1785, after the Expulsion of the Acadians. In the 19th century the village was very prosperous as a major ship building centre.

In 1801, the town rescued those who remained from the ship wreck of the Industry, after drifting in lifeboats for five days in the Bay of Fundy.

The Old Tusket Courthouse, built in 1805 and featuring a bell tower, is the oldest standing courthouse in Canada. The first Nova Scotian to die in aerial combat in World War II was from Tusket (Jack Elmer Hatfield, No. 264 Squadron RAF). The French-speaking high school École secondaire de Par-en-Bas is located in the community. The Université Sainte-Anne has a campus located in Tusket as well, in order to serve the Acadian community in surrounding areas.

There are many places, past and present, which use the word Tusket: Tusket (the village itself), Tusket River, Tusket Falls, Tusket Islands, Tusket Hill (present-day Amiraults Hill), Tusket Wedge (present-day Wedgeport), Tusket Forks (present-day Quinan) and villages that used to be called Upper Tusket and Lower Tusket. Present day Tusket is at the head of the Tusket River estuary, where high tide salt water meets the fresh water flow of the Tusket River.

The Tusket River and Basin presents a 32 kilometres (20 miles) wide basin with a very irregular 500 km (310 mi) coastline. Points, peninsulas, ridges and islands are separated by tidal channels, inlets, estuaries, bays, salt marshes and tidal flats. The salt marshes are unique since they encompass 3,200 hectares (8,000 acres), or one third the total acreage of natural salt marsh in the province. They are highly productive and play an important role in the ecology of the coastline and the off-shore waters. They also played a major role in the settlement of the Tusket Basin by the Acadian people. The Acadians made drainage ditches on the natural salt water marshes to be able to harvest the hay growing there. They were renowned for the construction of dykes and aboiteaux to produce hay-lands. Hay stacks are still visible today, in the region. One such aboiteau can be viewed at the West Pubnico Acadian Museum in West Pubnico, Nova Scotia. It was discovered and retrieved from a local salt marsh.

These waters are laden with nutrients, after having filtered through 32 km (20 mi) of river, and tons of dead plant matter and grasses. The Miꞌkmaq, who lived inland, travelled by canoe down the Tusket River to the sea. They depended, seasonally, on the availability of some staples. They harvested seals, sea bird eggs, cod, shellfish, smelts, gaspereau (Alewife), sturgeon, salmon, eels, tomcod, waterfowl, beaver, otter, rabbits, deer, moose, caribou and bear. All of these still inhabit the Tusket River system, except for the caribou.

== See also ==
- New Tusket
