= Cape Forchu =

Community and headland in Nova Scotia, Canada

Coordinates: 43°48′25″N 66°09′30″W

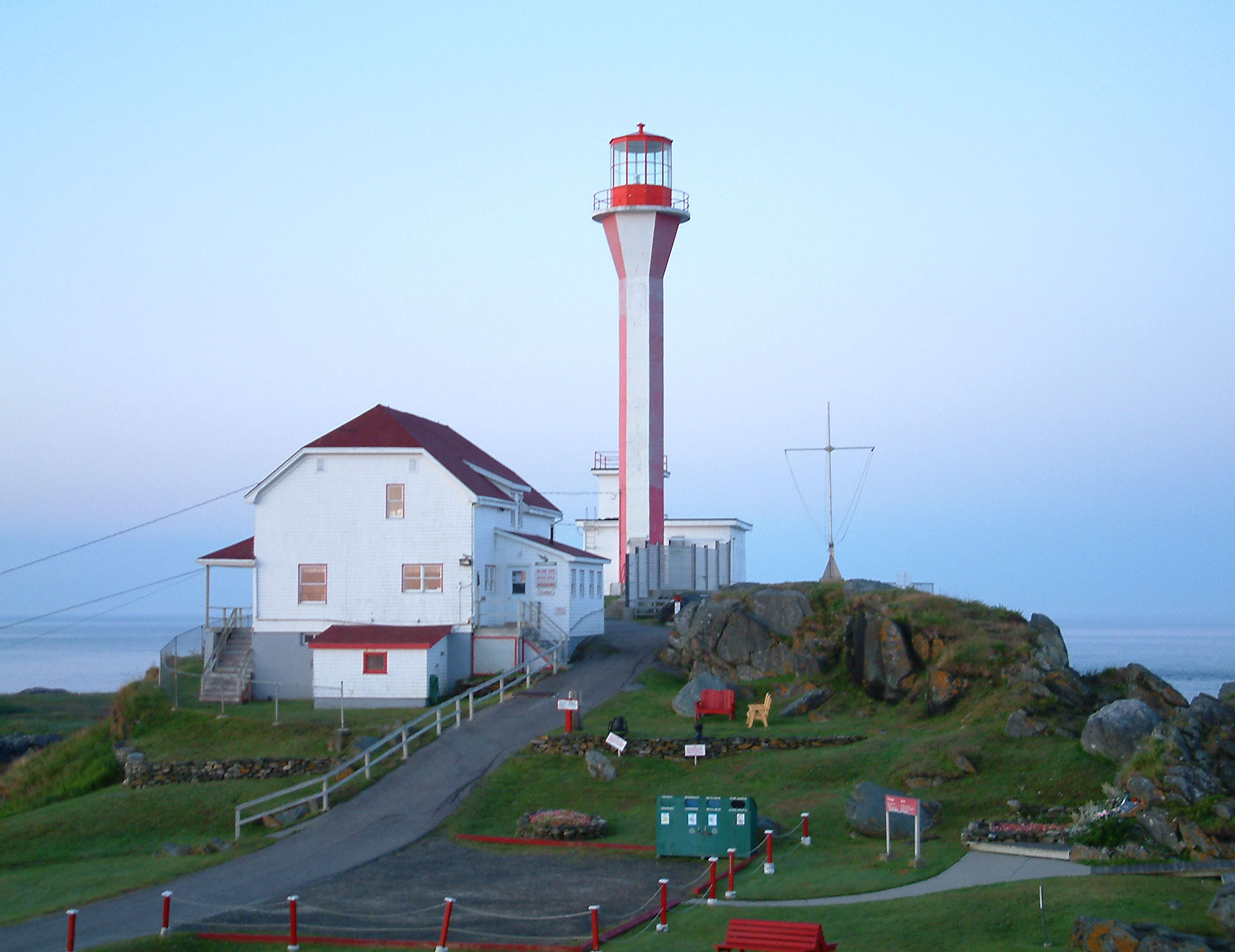
The Cape Forchu Lighthouse

Cape Forchu (/fɔːrˈʃuː/ for-SHOO) is a Canadian fishing community and headland of the same name in Yarmouth County, Nova Scotia.

== History ==
During the 17th and 18th centuries, fishing, water transportation and trade were essential to everyday life in Cape Forchu. During the American Revolution, in December 1775, American privateers took four vessels at Cape Forchu and took the people of the hamlet prisoners. During the 19th century, Yarmouth Harbour became a major port of registry for sailing ships and by the late 19th century, it was the second largest port of registry in Canada.

Shipwrecks were common along the shoreline and it was recommended by Colonel Robert Morse in 1874 that a chain of lighthouses should be built along the shores of Nova Scotia hence the construction of the Cape Forchu Lighthouse in 1840. This light station was replaced in 1962 with the "apple core" - a concrete tower. Since 2000, the original fresnel lens used at the lighthouse is located at the Yarmouth County Museum. At Cape Forchu there is an outcrop of the ancient supercontinent Gondwana.

The 2019 film The Lighthouse, directed by Robert Eggers and starring Robert Pattinson and Willem Dafoe, was shot almost entirely on Cape Forchu. For the exteriors shots, producers built a full-scale, 70-foot lighthouse tower on the cape that could withstand 120-kilometre winds.

The original 1840 lighthouse, demolished in 1961, was featured on a postage stamp in 2022, one of five Vintage Travel Posters stamps issued on June 9. The stamps had been planned for release in 2020, but were twice delayed due to the COVID-19 pandemic. The stamp shows the old lighthouse as it appears on a 1950 poster designed by Peter Ewart, promoting “Canada’s Picturesque East Coast” for Canadian Pacific.

Cape Forchu in Nova Scotia
