= Yarmouth County =

Yarmouth County Comté de Yarmouth (French) Siorrachd Yarmouth (Scottish Gaelic)
- County
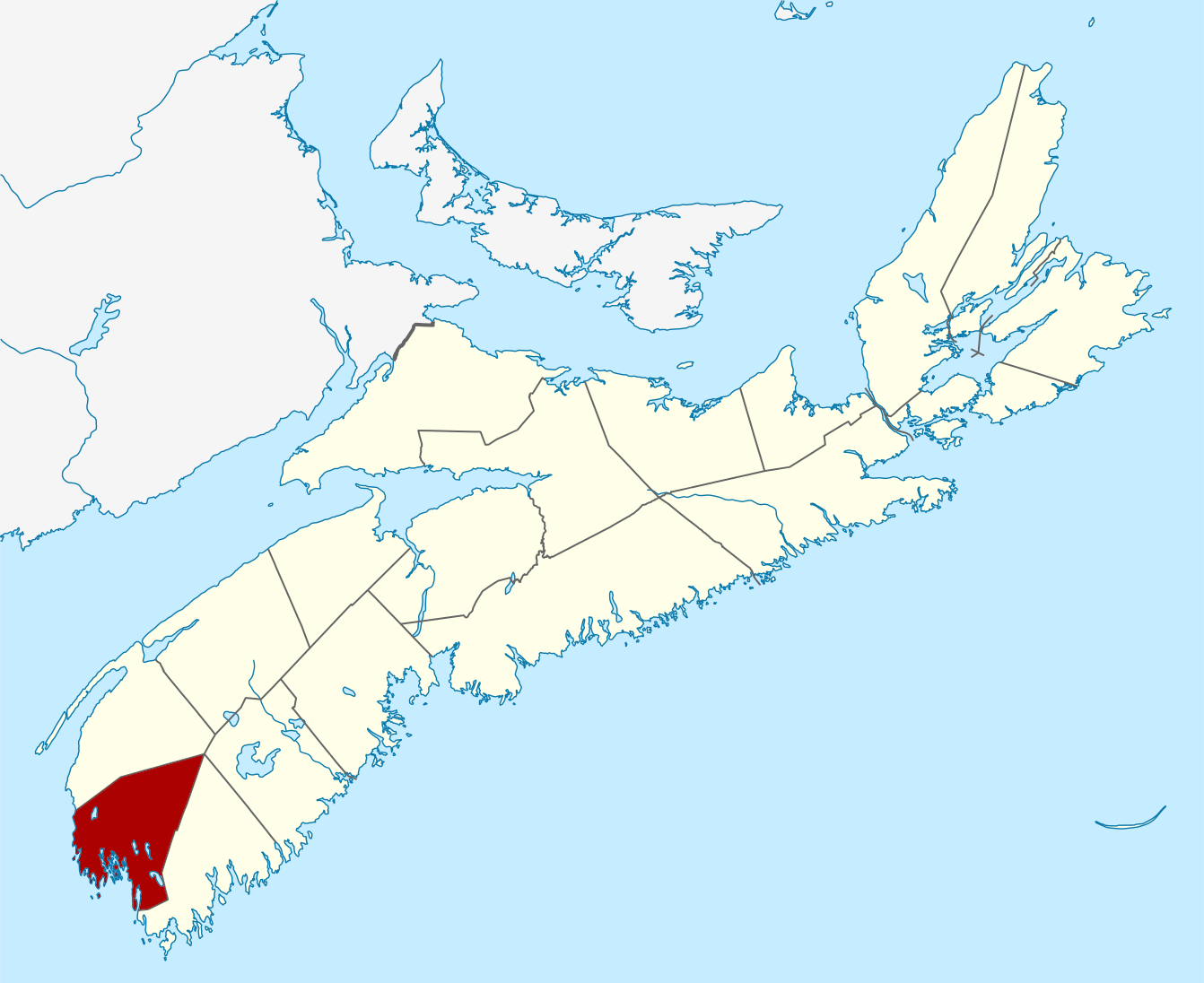
- Location of Yarmouth County, Nova Scotia
- Coordinates: 43°54′N 65°48′W
- Country: Canada
- Province: Nova Scotia
- District municipalities: Yarmouth; Argyle
- Towns: Yarmouth
- Established: 1836
- Divided into District Municipalities: April 17, 1879
- Electoral Districts Federal: West Nova
- Provincial: Yarmouth; Argyle-Barrington

Area
  - Land: 2,121.64 km^{2} (819.17 sq mi)

Population (2021)
  - Total: 24,947
  - Density: 11.8/km^{2} (31/sq mi)
  - Change 2016-21: ▲2.2%
- Time zone: UTC−04:00 (AST)
  - Summer (DST): UTC−03:00 (ADT)
- Area code: 902
- Dwellings: 12,342
- Median Income*: $41,744 CDN
- NTS Map: 20P13 Tusket
- GNBC Code: CBUEA
- Median household income, 2005 (all households)

Yarmouth County is a rural county in the Canadian province of Nova Scotia. It has both traditional Anglo-Scottish and Acadian French culture as well as significant inland wilderness areas, including over 365 lakes and several major rivers. It comprises three municipalities: the Town of Yarmouth, the Municipality of the District of Yarmouth, and the Municipality of the District of Argyle.

== History ==
The name Yarmouth first appeared as a projected township in Nova Scotia in 1759. There is some speculation it was named after Yarmouth, Massachusetts, as some of the earliest English settlers arrived from Cape Cod on 9 June 1761. It is more likely the township was named after Lady Yarmouth, a mistress of King George II.

Originally the area was part of Lunenburg County. In 1761 it became part of Queens County; in 1784 it became part of Shelburne County and finally became a county on its own in 1836. The description of Yarmouth County was modified in 1846. It was then divided into two districts for court sessional purposes in 1856 – Yarmouth and Argyle. These two districts were subsequently incorporated as district municipalities in 1879. The county was a major international shipbuilding centre in the 19th century, producing hundreds of ships including the namesake County of Yarmouth in 1884.

In the second half of the 19th century, Yarmouth was the site of the creation of the Nova Scotia Duck Tolling Retriever.

== Geography ==
The only town in the county is Yarmouth, which is one of three municipalities that comprise the county. The others are the Municipality of the District of Yarmouth and the Municipality of the District of Argyle. There are no incorporated villages in the county. The county also includes the Acadia First Nations, Yarmouth Reserve 33.

Bunker's Island peninsula is located in Yarmouth Harbour.

== Communities ==
Towns

- Yarmouth

Reserves

- Yarmouth 33

District municipalities

- Municipality of the District of Argyle
- Municipality of the District of Yarmouth

== Demographics ==
As a census division in the 2021 Census of Population conducted by Statistics Canada, Yarmouth County had a population of 24,947 living in 11,213 of its 12,529 total private dwellings, a change of 2.2% from its 2016 population of 24,419. With a land area of 2,121.64 km^{2} (819.17 sq mi), it had a population density of 11.8/km^{2} (30.5/sq mi) in 2021.

Population trend

Census	Population	Change (%)
2021	24,947	▲2.2%
2016	24,419	▼3.4%
2011	25,275	▼3.8%
2006	26,277	▼2.1%
2001	26,843	▼1.7%
1996	27,310	▼2.1%
1991	27,891	▲3.0%
1986	27,073	▲2.9%
1981	26,290	▲4.1%
1976	25,210	▲2.1%
1971	24,682	▲4.6%
1966	23,552	▲0.7%
1961	23,386	▲4.3%
1941	22,415	▲7.0%
1931	20,939	▼6.8%
1921	22,374	▼3.8%
1911	23,220	▲1.5%
1901	22,869	▲2.9%
1891	22,216	▲4.4%
1881	21,284	▲14.7%
1871	18,550	N/A

Mother tongue language (2016)

Language	Population	Pct (%)
English	18,765	77.96%
French	4,715	19.59%
Non-official languages	290	1.20%
English and French	265	1.10%
English and non-official language	35	0.14%
French and non-official language	5	0.02%

Ethnic groups (2006)

Ethnic origin	Population	Pct (%)
Canadian	13,265	51.3%
French	10,075	39.0%
English	8,340	32.2%
Scottish	3,995	15.4%
Irish	3,215	12.4%
Métis	2,740	10.6%
Acadian	1,825	7.1%
North American Indian	1,460	5.6%
German	1,330	5.1%
Dutch (Netherlands)	405	1.6%

Religion (2011)
Religion	Population	Pct (%)
Catholic	11,050	55.92%
No religious affiliation	5,040	25.51%
Baptist	4,575	23.15%
Other Christian	1,985	10.04%
Anglican	730	3.69%
United Church	585	2.96%
Pentecostal	515	2.61%
Muslim	55	0.28%
Presbyterian	50	0.25%
Buddhist	45	0.23%
Lutheran	35	0.18%
Other religions	30	0.15%
Jewish	20	0.10%
Traditional (Aboriginal) Spirituality	20	0.10%
Hindu	15	0.08%

Income (2006)

Income type	By CAD
Per capita income	$19,856
Median Household Income	$41,744
Median Family Income	$50,019

== Notable people ==
- Edgar Archibald (1885–1968), agricultural scientist
- Lucy Anne Rogers Butler (1841–1906), writer and social justice advocate
- Zach Churchill (b. 1984), Canadian politician
- Ryan Graves (b. 1995), Hockey player for the Pittsburgh Penguins

== See also ==
- Chebogue Cemetery
- List of communities in Nova Scotia
- List of schools in Nova Scotia
