= East Bay (Nova Scotia) =

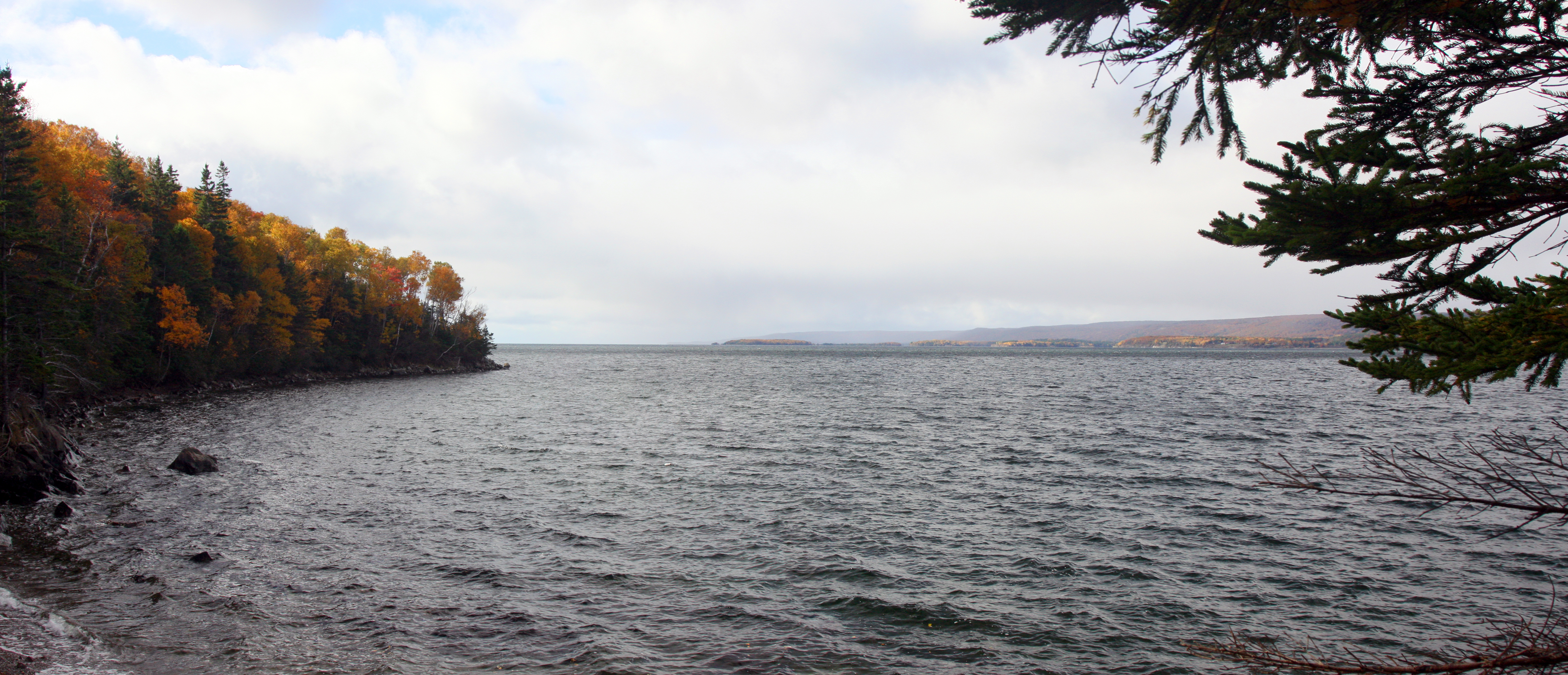
- East Bay in October

- East Bay in Nova Scotia East Bay (Canada)
- Location: Cape Breton Island, Nova Scotia
- Coordinates: 45°53′52″N 60°37′17″W
- Type: Bay
- Part of: Bras d'Or Lake
- Ocean/sea sources: Gulf of Saint Lawrence, Atlantic Ocean
- Basin countries: Canada
- Max. length: 22 nautical miles (41 km; 25 mi)
- Max. width: 5.2 nautical miles (9.6 km; 6.0 mi)
- Settlements: Cape Breton Regional Municipality Communities include (from northwest to the bay's eastern terminus to southwest): Benacadie; Castle Bay; Eskasoni; Island View; Northside East Bay; Portage (at the head of the bay); East Bay; Ben Eoin; St. Andrew's Channel; Big Pond; Big Pond Centre; Middle Cape; Irishvale
- References: Geographical Names of Canada - East Bay

East Bay is a bay of the Bras d'Or Lake on Cape Breton Island in the Canadian province of Nova Scotia. It lies entirely within Cape Breton County.

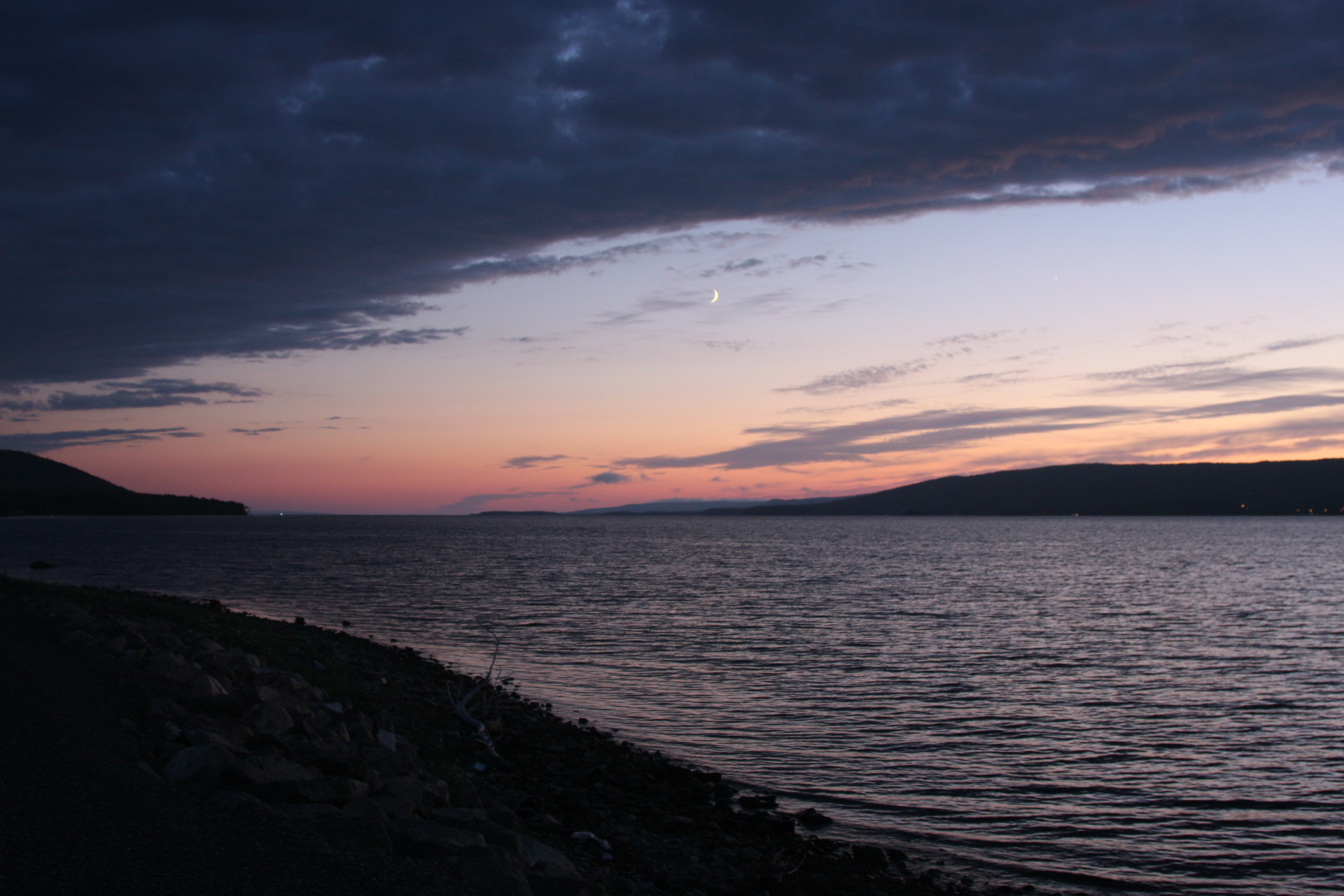
East Bay at sunset

== Description ==
East Bay is one of three long narrow arms that extend to the east of the main body of the Bras d'Or Lake, the others being St. Andrews Channel and Great Bras d'Or Channel. As East Bay is part of the Bras d'Or Lake system and the lake is essentially a fjordal system connected to the North Atlantic via two restricted channels at the Great Bras d'Or Channel north of Boularderie Island and the Little Bras d'Or Channel to south of Boularderie Island, the waters of East Bay are brackish, partially fresh/ salt water.

East Bay opens to the south-west directly onto the Bras d'Or Lake and lies between the Boisdale Hills to the north and the East Bay Hills to the south. The bay measures 8.3 kilometres (5.2 mi) wide at its mouth, between Benacadie Point to the north, and Middle Cape to the south and runs easterly 41 kilometres (25 mi) to its terminus at Portage. East Bay has 77.9 kilometres (48.4 mi) of shoreline.

The bay's shores are generally heavily wooded and consist mainly of bold and rocky shorelines interspersed with numerous barrachois (barrier) points and beaches. Glacial drumlin deposits form a group of islands along the northern shore of East Bay. The narrower eastern end of the bay is bridged by the East Bay Sandbar, running east–west 1.25 kilometres (0.78 mi).

== The name ==
The present day name for the bay, "East Bay", appears in written accounts as early as 1829, and on maps of the area at least as far back as 1855, though both current and former names (previously "St. Andrews Channel") appeared together on maps as late as 1890. The earlier name "St. Andrews Channel", is now used to identify the adjacent arm of the lake to the north falling between the Boisdale Hills and Boulardarie Island.

== Oceanography ==
East Bay's limited connections to the open ocean through the relatively narrow and shallow Great and Little Bras d'Or channels and the Barra Strait result in limited tidal movement. This, in combination with high freshwater runoff, results in relatively low salinity of 20-21 p.p.t.in surface waters at the east end of East Bay. A thermocline and halocline develop at 10–20 metres (33–66 ft) during the summer and probably deepen in the winter. Measurements of oxygen and salinity indicate that lake water is a mix of Atlantic water and local runoff, with an insignificant contribution from groundwater. The bay is at least partially covered by ice most winters, with water temperatures warming by more than 10 °C from May to July.

East Bay shows a typical estuarine water circulation, with brackish near-surface waters tending to flow toward the open lake to the west, and deep saline water tending to flow into the bay. The long fetch offered by West Bay to the south-west can result in sizeable waves and swells to develop during southwest or northeast gales.

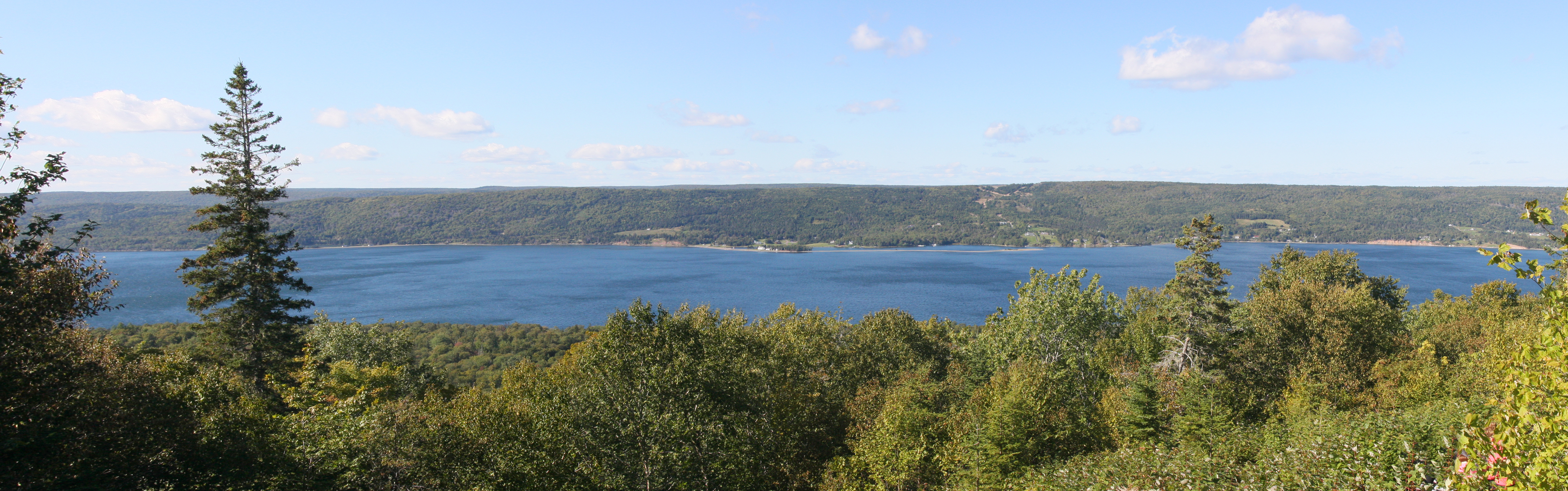
The view from the Ben Eoin Provincial Park Lookoff

== Geology and seabed morphology ==
Much of the coastal topography around the bay is very steep, rising almost immediately from the shoreline to elevations of 180 to 200 metres (590 to 660 ft). Like the other major channels of the Bras d'Or Lake (St. Patricks, Great Bras d’Or, Little Bras d’Or and St. Andrews), East Bay has a northeast – southwest orientation. Rifting and regional tectonic plate movements some 360 million years ago formed this directional series of small fault bounded basins between highlands of resistant crystalline rock. The northern shoreline suggests that the bay is largely underlain by Carboniferous Windsor Group sedimentary rocks, principally shale, sandstone and gypsum. The southern shoreline is generally the elongated block of Precambrian rocks known as the East Bay Hills, composed of volcanic deposits of the Fourchu Group (ash and lava interleaved with marine sediments) and earlier Paleozoic era intrusive granite and quartzite. This is some of the oldest surficial geology visible around the Bras d'Or Lake, yet soft Windsor Group rocks form a narrow band along the bay's southern shore and extend out as the lake floor.

East Bay occupies a regional lowland that developed in soft Windsor Group rocks before the Quaternary glacial period. The main excavation of the deep channel (81–82 metres (266–269 ft)) in East Bay appears to be a consequence of glacial erosion, probably over hundreds of thousands of years through the Quaternary. The cliffs bordering the lake are unusual because they preserve organic sediments predating the last glaciation that provide a window on earlier environmental conditions.

The morphology of the lake floor is influenced by the deposition of glacial till and pre-glacial silty muds that occurred during the last retreat of ice. A series of recessional moraines are visible on the floor of East Bay, with pre-glacial silty muds thickening eastward.

Post-glacial history

The shallowness of the links between the Bras d'Or Lake and the Atlantic Ocean have resulted in a complex post-glacial history. Final melting of glacial ice probably occurred about 10,000 years after the Younger Dryas climatic oscillation. The first sediments deposited above glacial till in the central part of the lake, probably 10,000 to 9,000 years ago, contain dinocysts that indicate some penetration of marine water into the lake. The relatively high sea level inferred at this time reflects the continuing depression of the land from loading by glacial ice. Rebound from this depression cut off marine-water influx from about 9,000 to 4,500 years ago. As a result, for many thousands of years the Bras d'Or Lakes were fresh and relatively stable in size, water level and shoreline and were divided into a series of smaller lakes connected by rivers. East Bay was for the most part dry land during this period but the deeper area in the western part of the present bay was even then a significant bay off the main body of the largest of these lakes. Well-preserved and recognizable submerged coastal landforms are common in this part of East Bay. Clearly discernible tombolos, spits, and barrier beaches are present at this former coastline, 25–23 metres (82–75 ft) below present lake water levels. To the east, the present deep section of the bay east of the McPhee Islands was also a small lake, separated from the other lakes by a section of dry land, connected by a stream. Late Holocene subsidence resulted in a renewed influx of marine water in the last 4,500 years. The effects of this subsidence are seen in the transgressive character of many of the shoreline features.

Sediments

Sediment distribution in the Bras d'Or Lake is similar to that found in many of the larger coastal inlets on the southern shore of Nova Scotia. Deeper areas of the lake are floored by mud, except for the sands found in some areas flushed by tidal currents. Coastal erosion of glacial sediments has led to the formation of many sandy and gravelly barrier beaches and spits.

== Plants ==
Seaweed species are similar to those of the Gulf of St. Lawrence. In both areas, seaweeds usually found in intertidal zones occur only in deeper water as the result of winter ice activity, and the rockweed Ascophyllum nodosum is found subtidally. Sheltered bays have marginal salt to freshwater marsh vegetation.

== Animals ==
East Bay is one of the areas where the American Oyster is found, owing to warmer water temperatures suitable for growth and reproduction. A significant population of sand shrimp, a southern species, exists here. The polychaete fauna is Virginian in character but also includes some arctic-boreal species. Other invertebrate populations include lobster (Homarus americanus), Atlantic rock crab (Cancer irroratus), the invasive species Green crab (Carcinus maenas), sea urchins (Strongylocentrotus droebachiensis), starfish (Asterias vulgaris), sand dollars (Echinarachnius parma) and periwinkles.

A varied fish fauna includes blueback herring, blackspotted stickleback, American eel and a southern population of Greenland cod. A feral population of rainbow trout is present in the bay as well. These support strong populations of great blue heron, double-crested cormorant, and bald eagle.

== Cultural environment ==
Most cultural use of East Bay is related to shore-based activities. The area is of high cultural significance to the Mi'kmaq people. Eskasoni, a Mi'kmaq reserve, is the largest community on the bay, situated on the bay's northern shore.

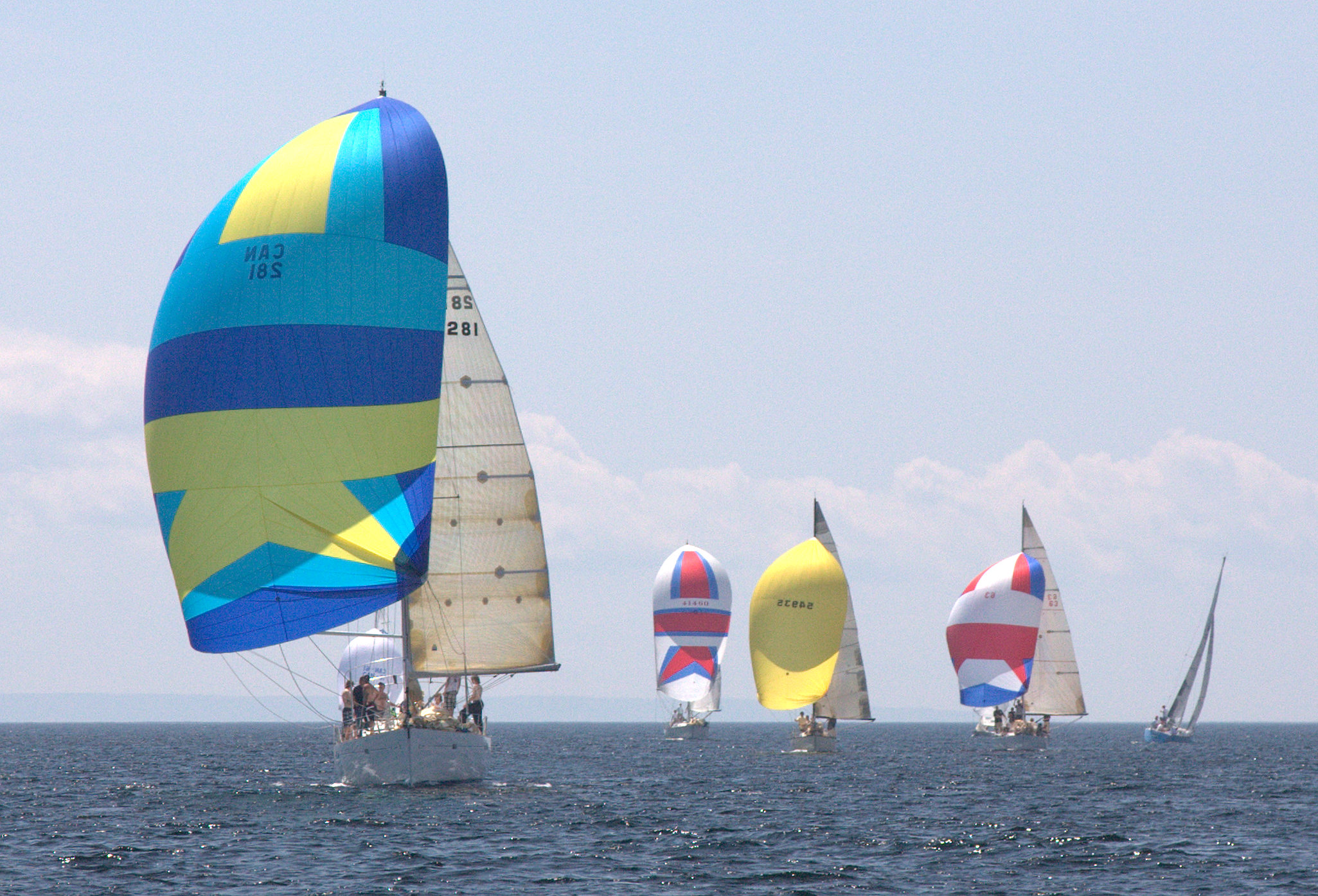
The East Bay Regatta, held the last weekend in July since 1984, features races and other social events. In some years as many as 40 boats participate.

The bay is important for recreational boating. Sailboat racing is a long tradition in East Bay. The East Bay Regatta, held the last weekend in July since 1984, features races and other social events. In some years as many as 40 boats participate. A marina for local and visiting boaters was completed and opened in the spring of 2013 at the community of Ben Eoin as part of the existing ski hill and golf course complex.

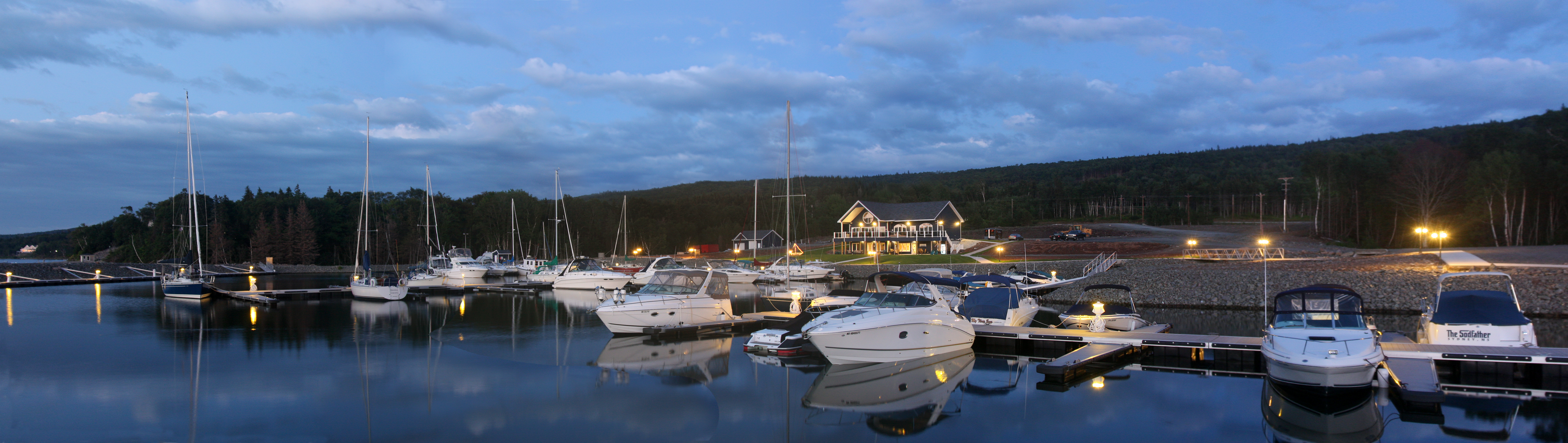
Ben Eoin Marina, Ben Eoin, Nova Scotia

There is a popular public swimming beach at the East Bay Sandbar, just to the north of the small community of East Bay, and another in the community of Big Pond, opposite St Mary's Catholic Church.

== Communities ==
Communities along the shoreline of East Bay include (from northwest to the bay's eastern terminus to southwest):

Cape Breton County

- Benacadie
- Castle Bay
- Eskasoni
- Island View
- Northside East Bay
- Portage (at the head of the bay)
- East Bay
- Ben Eoin
- St. Andrew's Channel
- Big Pond
- Big Pond Centre
- Middle Cape
- Irishvale

== See also ==
- List of communities in Nova Scotia
