= Nova Scotia Route 216 =

Highway in Nova Scotia, Canada

Route 216

Route information
- Maintained by Nova Scotia Department of Transportation and Infrastructure Renewal
- Length: 42 km (26 mi)

Major junctions
- West end: Route 223 in Christmas Island
- East end: Trunk 4 in East Bay

Location
- Country: Canada
- Province: Nova Scotia
- Counties: Cape Breton Regional Municipality

Highway system
- Provincial highways in Nova Scotia; 100-series
← Route 215	→ Route 217

Route 216 is a collector road in the Canadian province of Nova Scotia.

It is located in the Cape Breton Regional Municipality and connects East Bay at Trunk 4 with Christmas Island at Route 223.

It is designated as part of the Bras d'Or Lakes Scenic Drive.

== Communities ==
- Christmas Island
- Benacadie West
- Benacadie Pond
- Castle Bay
- Eskasoni
- Island View
- Northside East Bay
- McKenzie East Bay
- East Bay

== See also ==
- List of Nova Scotia provincial highways
