= Ski Ben Eoin =

Ski hill in Nova Scotia, Canada

- Location within Nova Scotia
- Location: Ben Eoin, Nova Scotia, Canada
- Nearest city: Sydney, Nova Scotia
- Coordinates: 45°58′27″N 60°26′7″W
- Vertical: 153 m (502 ft)
- Top elevation: 154 m (505 ft)
- Base elevation: 1 m (3 ft 3 in)
- Trails: 11
- Lift system: 1 chairlift 1 surface lift
- Snowmaking: Yes
- Night skiing: Yes
- Website: www.skibeneoin.com

Ski Ben Eoin is a ski hill located in Ben Eoin, Nova Scotia, Canada, which is approximately 27 km from Sydney. The hill overlooks the East Bay of the Bras d'Or Lakes. The ski hill was founded in 1968.

It features 11 runs, including a terrain park, and has two lifts, one a quad chair and the other a magic carpet. The longest run is 1300 m.

The hill has a vertical drop of 153 m.
