= Portage, Nova Scotia =

Community in Nova Scotia, Canada

Portage
- Unincorporated community
- Location of Portage in Nova Scotia
- Coordinates: 46°2′19″N 60°20′26″W
- Country: Canada
- Province: Nova Scotia
- Regional municipality: Cape Breton Regional Municipality
- Time zone: UTC-4 (AST)
  - Summer (DST): UTC-3 (ADT)
- Forward sortation area: B1J
- Area codes: 902 and 782
- NTS Map: 011K01
- GNBC Code: CBEJB

Portage is a community in the Canadian province of Nova Scotia, located in the Cape Breton Regional Municipality on Cape Breton Island.

This community is situated at the head of the East Bay of the Bras d'Or Lake, about 19 kilometres (12 mi) south-west of Sydney, and is named after the 3.5 kilometres (2 mi) portage that existed here between East Bay and Sydney River via Blacketts Lake, and so to Sydney Harbour and Spanish Bay. A former name for the community was "Portage East Bay".

The Mi'kmaq name for the portage and the small land locked basin at the head of the bay was "Tewitnochk", which still survives as "Tweednooge" (occasionally "Tweedmooge", "Tuidnuge" or "Tweedporge"). "Tweednooge Place" is now a street name in the neighbouring community of East Bay.

European settlement was begun in the area by people who moved here from Tracadie, Prince Edward Island, attracted by the availability of grants of land. The first, Donald Gillis & Duncan Curry, came and scouted the area in 1811, Donald applying for a lot "in the Bras d' Or Lake above the narrows, bordering on the marsh". Donald Gillis’ land was at Tweednooge at the head of the channel. His 350 acres he called "Gilliesmon" (alternate spelling "Gillissmore").
