= East Bay Hills (Nova Scotia) =

Hill group in Nova Scotia, Canada

- Location within Nova Scotia Location within Canada

Highest point
- Peak: Sgurra Bhreac
- Elevation: 222 m (728 ft)
- Prominence: 212 m (696 ft)
- Parent peak: Blueberry Barren
- Isolation: 14.92 km (9.27 mi)
- Coordinates: 45°55′42.88972″N 60°25′46.70739″W

Dimensions
- Length: 48 km (30 mi) NE -SW
- Width: 7.5 km (4.7 mi) NW - SE

Naming
- Etymology: from the East Bay of the Bras d'Or Lake they border along their northern edge

Geography
- Location: Cape Breton County, Nova Scotia, Canada
- Range coordinates: 45°49′50″N 60°36′35″W
- Parent range: Cape Breton Highlands, Appalachian Mountains
- Topo map: NTS 11F16 Mira River

Geology
- Rock age: Precambrian
- Mountain type: Fault-block mountains

Climbing
- Access: road/hike

The East Bay Hills refer to a 'fault ridge' of ancient rock on the south side of the East Bay of the Bras d'Or Lake, located on Cape Breton Island, Canada, and are an extension of the Appalachian mountain chain. The East Bay Hills lie in Cape Breton County.

The East Bay Hills rise to little more than 180 metres (590 ft), forming low ridges in an otherwise lowland landscape. These hill are largely uninhabited (by humans), and include the highest elevation point on Cape Breton Island south of the Bras d'Or Lake at Sgurra Bhreac with a commanding view of the Mira area and Atlantic Ocean to the south.

== Geology and landscape development ==
The East Bay Hills are an elongated block of Precambrian rocks and is composed of two rock types: primarily volcanic deposits of the Fourchu Group (ash and lava interleaved with marine sediments), but also granites. They are elongated northeast–southwest in accordance with the same prevailing trend of faults which dominates the geological structures of the North Bras d'Or Uplands. The southeastern margins are also faulted, in this case bringing the resistant Precambrian strata against late Carboniferous sandstones and siltstones. On the northeastern side the contact is with easily eroded Carboniferous Windsor Group strata, which were deposited directly against the blocks when they stood as islands in the Carboniferous Sea.

In form and structure the relief and elevations of the East Bay Hills reflect not only their geological setting, surrounded by rocks of varying resistance, but also their position on the low side of the planation surface. Precambrian rocks of equivalent resistance have created dominant uplands further north in Cape Breton, but here, where there was little uplift during the Tertiary, there was also minimal rejuvenation of erosional action and limited exposure of this hard core of old rocks.

The steepest slopes are found on the northwest side of the East Bay Hills, where soft Windsor Group rocks form a narrow band along the shore. The valley of Breac Brook, at the north end of East Bay Hills, appears to be an ancient coastal valley which was filled by Windsor Group deposits and is now being exhumed. The fault line on the southeastern margin can be seen in some areas (e.g., northeast of Oban) but in general does not form a prominent scarp slope.

In this part of Cape Breton south of Bras d'Or Lake, glaciation more than geological structure appears to have influenced drainage patterns. South of East Bay Hills the glacial direction is strongly northeast–southwest, in this case parallel to the fault which defines their southern boundary.

== Fresh water ==
The East Bay Hills have relatively flat plateau-like crests which are poorly drained. Most streams are located on the margins and are aligned northeast, reflecting the glacial direction. The hills contains several lakes and a few scattered raised bogs.

== Soils ==
Heavily podzolized Thom soils with a thick iron humate B horizon cover most of the hills. They are associated with Arichat soils (poorly drained, mottled, sandy loams), found where the relief is gently undulating or depressional. There are also small areas of peat.

== Plants ==
These hills are somewhat lower than the North Bras d'Or Hills and shade-tolerant hardwoods, although present, are not dominant. The East Bay Hills support instead mixed stands of Red Maple, White Birch, Yellow Birch, American Beech, Balsam Fir, and White Spruce.

== Animals ==
There are few moose in this area. Deer are found on side slopes in winter yards. There are a large number of eagle nests in stream ravines.

== Tourism ==
The hills offer views north over Bras d'Or Lake, for example, where Highway 4 climbs above shore level near Irish Cove and Middle Cape. Ben Eoin Provincial Park lies along the north edge of the hills. The Ben Eoin Trail (1.7 kilometres (1.1 mi) return) starts at the Ben Eoin Provincial Picnic Park and leads to a well cleared look-off of solid ground and large flat stone on a ridge of the East Bay Hills with a panoramic view of the East Bay of the Bras d'Or Lake 165 metres (541 ft) below.

== Cultural environment ==
Small-scale farming is practised in some areas of the East Bay Hills. Fishing the waters of the Bras d'Or Lake and sporadic forestry have been economic activities in the past. Much of this area is now cottage country, and tourism plays a significant role in the local economy. In the early 1900s the mineral springs at Glengarry in Irish Cove were well known for their perceived healing properties, which drew local people as well as distant travellers.
