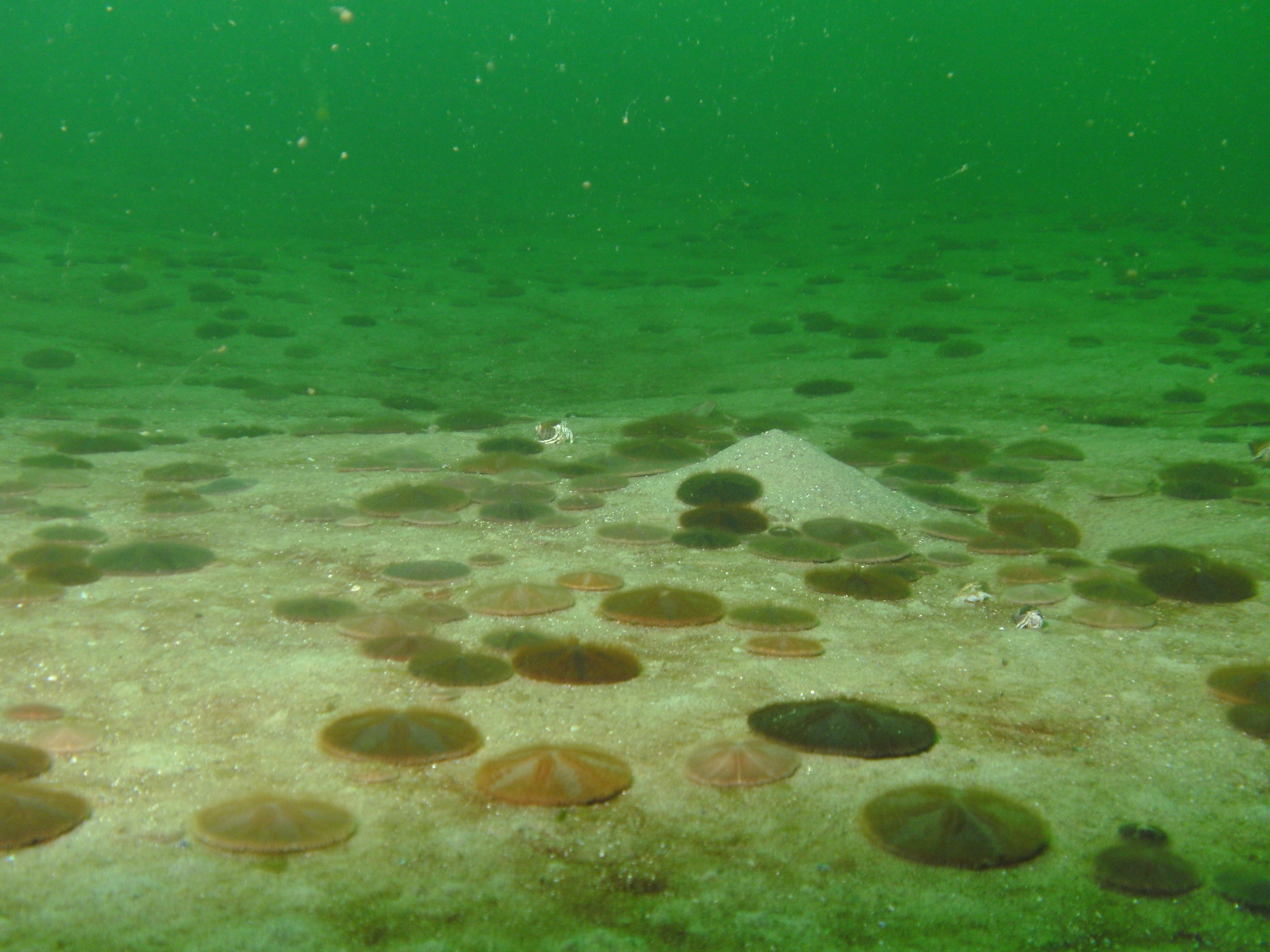
- Echinarachnius parma
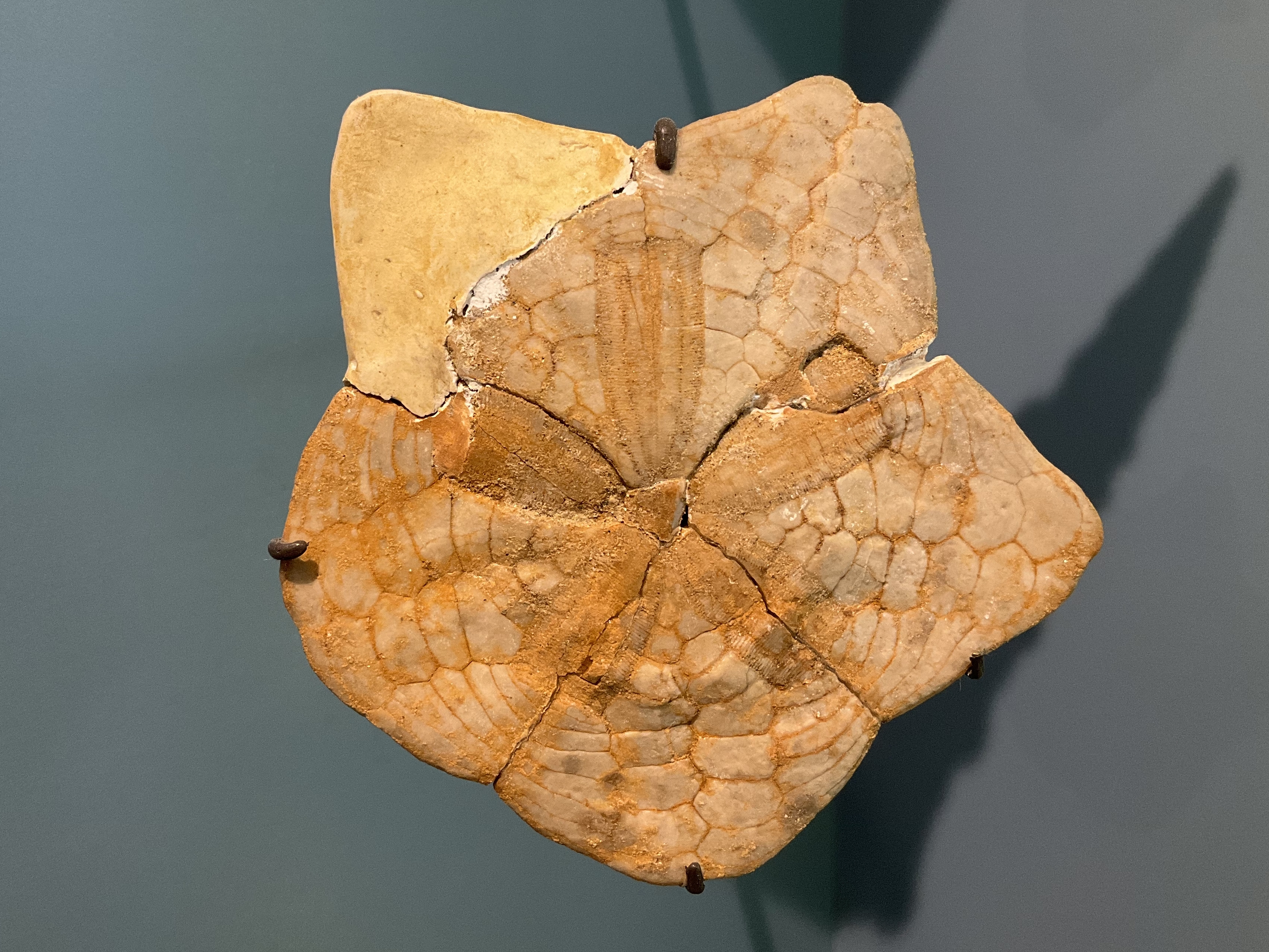
- †Vaquerosella norrisi

Scientific classification
- Kingdom: Animalia
- Phylum: Echinodermata
- Class: Echinoidea
- Order: Clypeasteroida
- Family: Echinarachniidae

= Echinarachniidae =

Echinarachniidae Temporal range: Middle Eocene–Present

Family of sand dollars

Echinarachniidae is a family of echinoderms belonging to the order Clypeasteroida. This clade appeared in the Middle Miocene epoch and is still living today in the North Pacific Ocean (California and Japan) ocean to Northeast Canada and Southern United States.

== Genera ==
Genera:

- Astrodapsis Conrad, 1856
- Echinarachnius Gray, 1825
- Faassia Shmidt, 1971
- Kewia Nisiyama, 1935
- Proescutella Pomel, 1883
- Pseudastrodapsis Durham, 1953
- Scutellaster Cragin, 1895
- Tenuirachnius Durham, 1955
- Vaquerosella Durham, 1955
