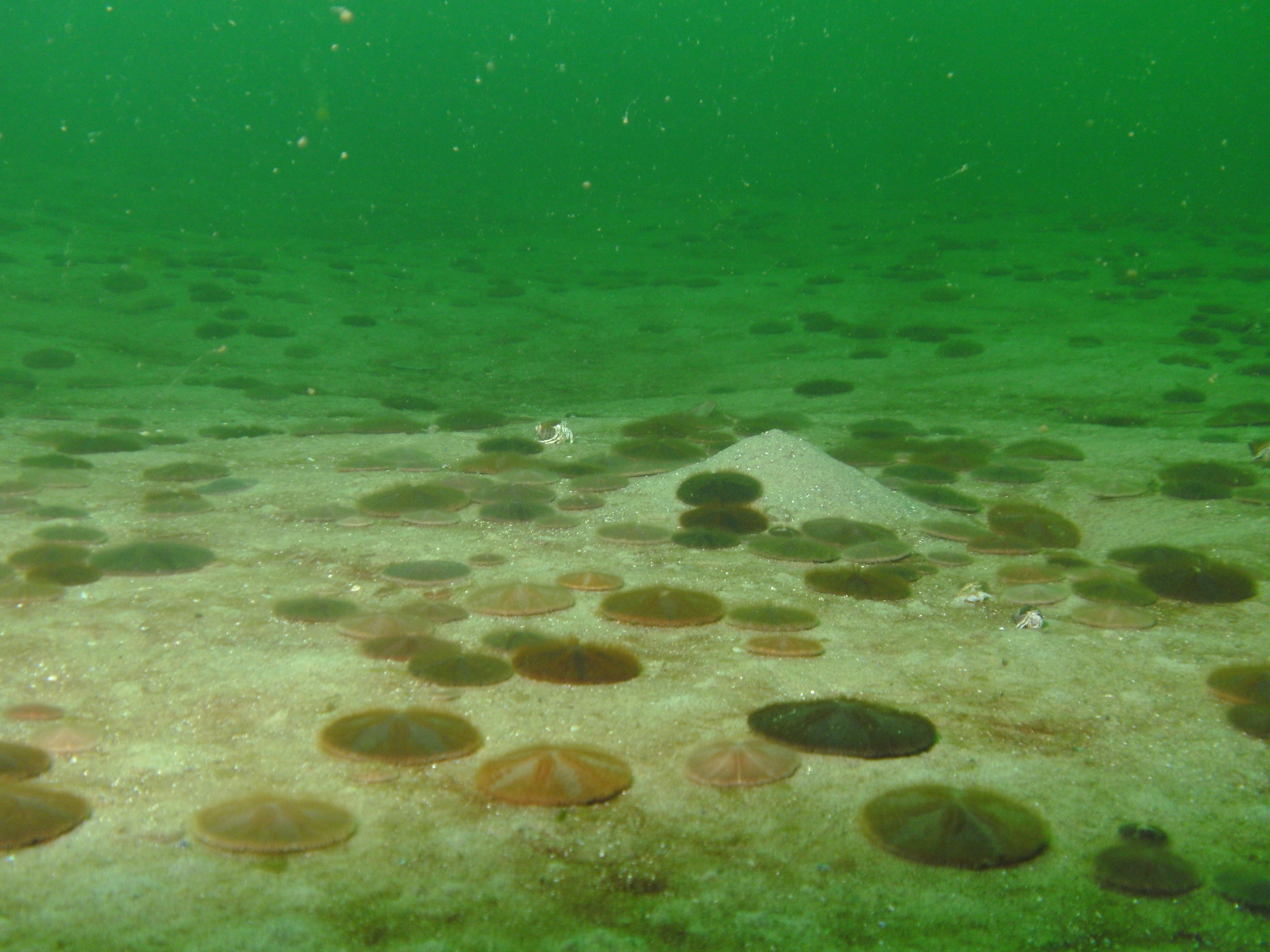
- Echnarachnius parma

Scientific classification
- Kingdom: Animalia
- Phylum: Echinodermata
- Class: Echinoidea
- Superorder: Neognathostomata
- Order: Clypeasteroida
- Family: Echinarachniidae
- Genus: Echinarachnius; Gray, 1825

Synonyms
- Echinarachinus (misspelling); Echinarachnius (Echinarachnius) Gray, 1825 (subgeneric subdivision not accepted by scientific community); Phelsumaster Lambert & Thiéry, 1914 (objective junior synonym); Phelsumia Pomel, 1883 (junior homonym of Phelsumia Gray, 1840 (Reptilia))

= Echinarachnius =

Genus of sea urchins

Echinarachnius is a genus of sand dollars, belonging to the family Echinarachniidae.

Species of Echinarachnius have been around since the Pliocene epoch.

== Species ==
- †Echinarachnius alaskensis Durham, 1957
- Echinarachnius asiaticus Michelin, 1859
- †Echinarachnius humilis Nisiyama, 1968
- †Echinarachnius kewi Grant & Eaton in Eaton, Grant & Allen, 1941
- †Echinarachnius naganoensis Morishita, 1953
- Echinarachnius parma (Lamarck, 1816)
- †Echinarachnius rumoensis Hayasaka & Shibata, 1952
- †Echinarachnius subtumidus Nisiyama & Hashimoto, 1950
