= Ben Eoin =

- Unincorporated community
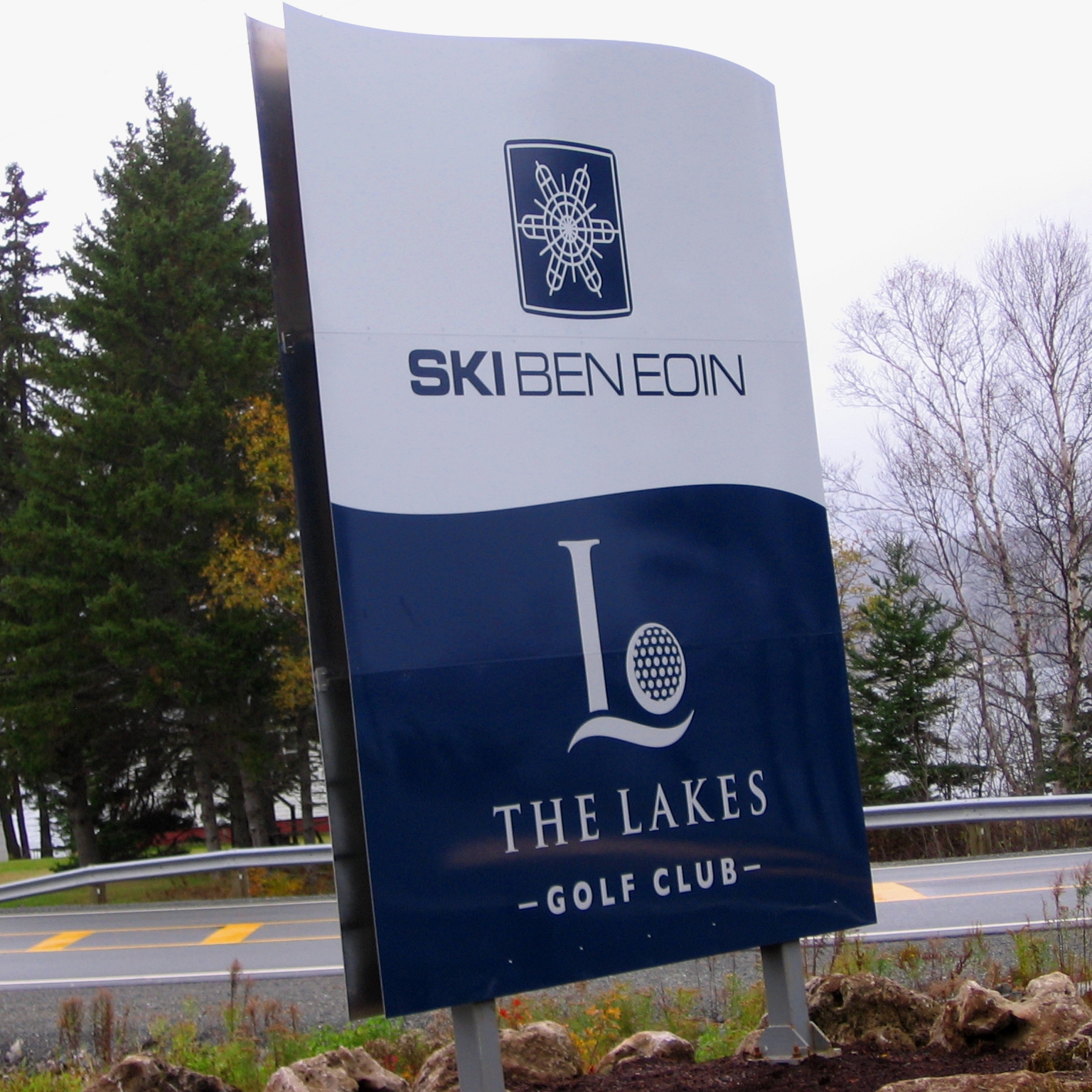
- Ben Eoin is best known for its all season resort

- Location of East Bay in Nova Scotia
- Coordinates: 45°58′4″N 60°27′18″W
- Country: Canada
- Province: Nova Scotia
- Regional municipality: Cape Breton Regional Municipality
- Time zone: UTC-4 (AST)
  - Summer (DST): UTC-3 (ADT)
- Forward sortation area: B1J
- Area codes: 902 and 782
- NTS Map: 011F16
- GNBC Code: CACRI

Ben Eoin (/bɛnˈjɑːn/; Scottish Gaelic: Beinn Eòin) is a community in the Canadian province of Nova Scotia, located in the Cape Breton Regional Municipality.

Ben Eoin lies on the East Bay of the Bras d'Or Lake and hosts an all season resort including a ski hill (Ski Ben Eoin), an 18-hole golf course (The Lakes Golf Club) and a 75-slip marina (The Ben Eoin Yacht Club & Marina). Also located in Ben Eoin is a provincial picnic and hiking park (Ben Eoin Provincial Park), a country inn (The Birches) and a large summer trailer park (Ben Eoin Beach RV Resort & Campground).

The name, Beinn Eòin, translates to "John's Mountain" ("Eoin" means John) and is named after John (Jonathan - son of John) McNeil, a farmer who lived at the foot of Ben Eoin around 1855 or earlier. (R.M. McLellan PM 1905).

== Parks ==
- Ben Eoin Provincial Park
