= Sgurra Bhreac (Nova Scotia) =

Mountain in Nova Scotia, Canada

- the Big Rock
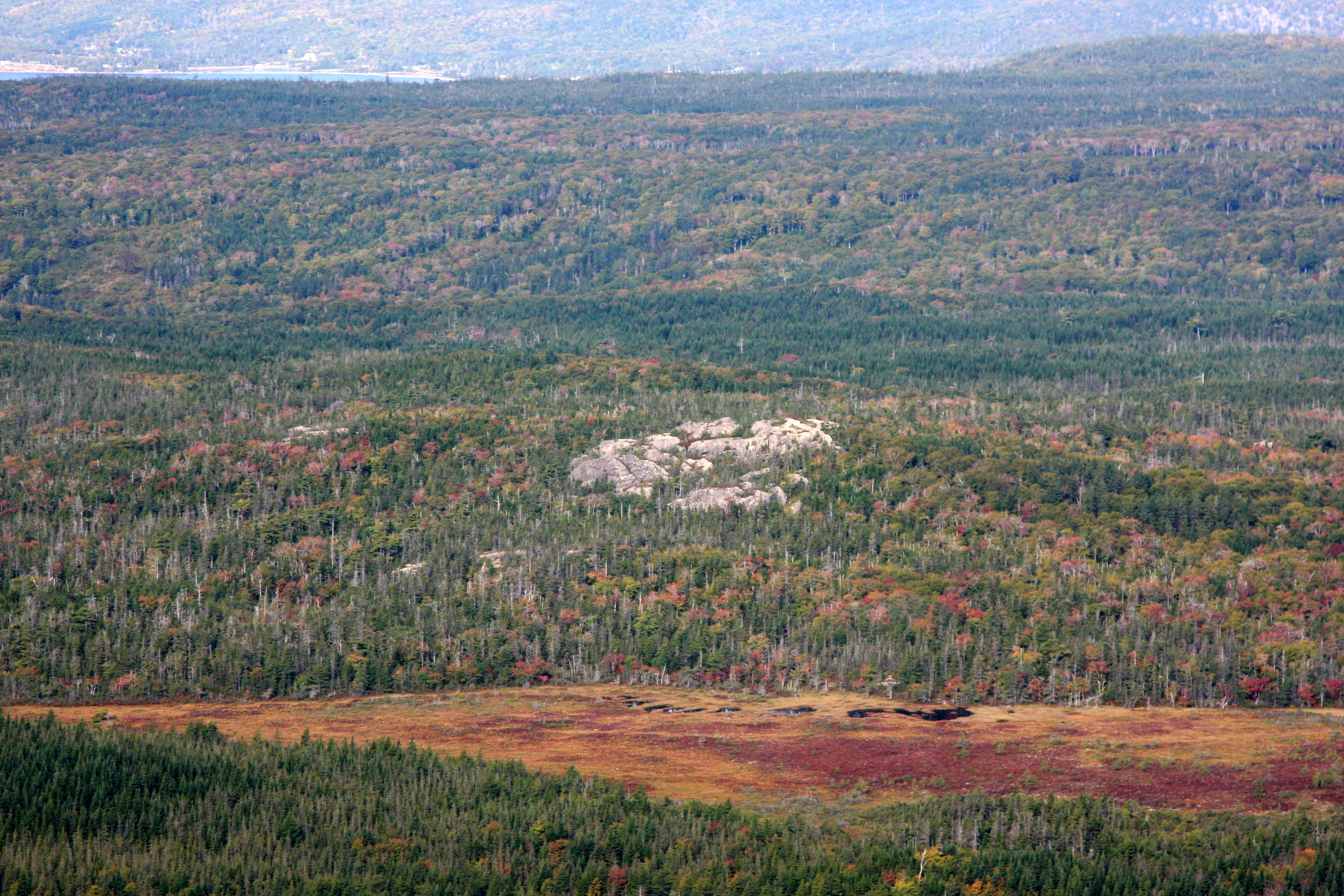
- Sgurra Bhreac lies in the East Bay Hills

Highest point
- Elevation: 222 m (728 ft)
- Prominence: 212 m (696 ft)
- Coordinates: 45°55′42.88972″N 60°25′46.70739″W

Naming
- Etymology: name means spotted or pitted ridge or rock in Gaelic

Geography
- Location: Cape Breton County, Nova Scotia, Canada
- Parent range: East Bay Hills
- Topo map: NTS 11F16 Mira River

Climbing
- Easiest route: drive / hike

Sgurra Bhreac (alternative spelling 'Sgurra Breac'), sometimes referred to as the Big Rock, is a Canadian peak in the East Bay Hills of Cape Breton Island, an extension of the Appalachian mountain chain in the province of Nova Scotia. Sgurra Bhreac is a prominent rock outcrop, rising 50 m (160 ft) from the northern edge of The Big Barren, between the Breac Brook and Glengarry Valleys, and is the highest point on Cape Breton Island south of the Bras d'Or Lake with its summit at 222 m (728 ft).

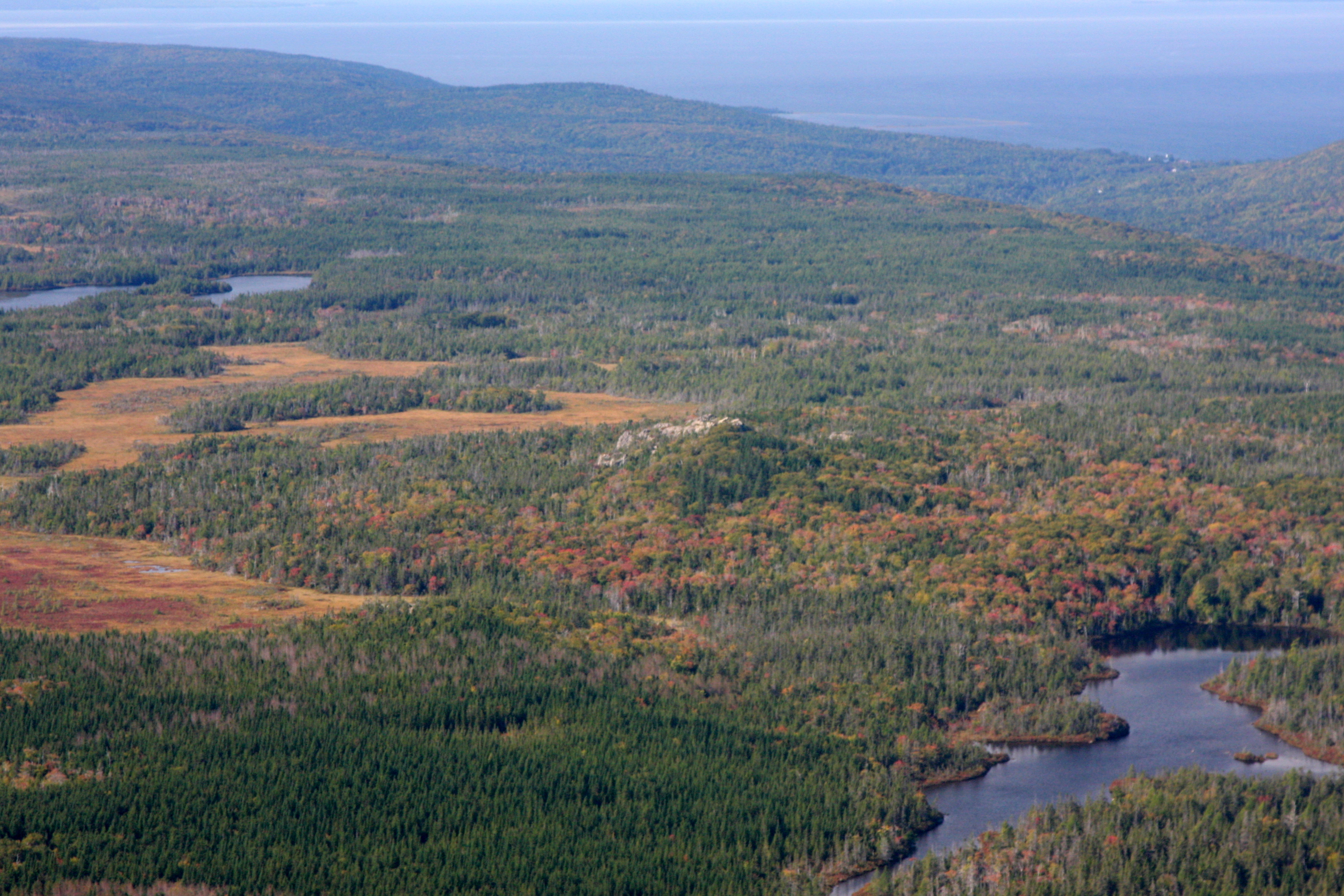
Sgurra Bhreac (centre), East of Rock Lakes in the foreground right, Peggy Allans Lake behind left, and the Bras d'Or Lake in the distance.

== Location ==
Thirty kilometres (19 miles) west of Sydney, inland of the community of Big Pond and 1 km (0.62 mi) southwest of East of Rock Lakes, the peak can be approached to within 1 km (0.62 mi) by back roads, either Glengarry Rd. (named "Spring Road" on older maps) to the south or a road (unnamed on current topographical maps) to the north passing through Rear Big Pond, which follows the Breac Brook Valley. The final approach to the peak is by hiking.

== Name ==
Sgurra is a Gaelic term for “hill.” The form 'Sgurr' or 'Sgùrr na' is not uncommon as part of the name of a mountain in Scotland. In Canada, however, its usage in geographical names is rare and generally only found in the province of Nova Scotia where it is a generic term for hill. The name, Sgurra Bhreac, (pronunciation approximately "skoor ah brec") means spotted or pitted ridge or rock in Gaelic, speckled peak.

The name, Sgurra Bhreac, was officially adopted for the big rock on 2 December 1924. The Sgurra Breac, a local history / natural sciences newsletter published from 2004 to 2010, had adopted the name of the "Big Rock".

== Survey monument ==
There is a first order Natural Resources Canada Geodetic Survey Division Station (Unique Number: 21139) on the summit, consisting of three markers. Two are brass/bronze disks and one is a copper survey bolt. This station was established sometime before 1921 as a fourth order station, and upgraded to first order in 1969/1970.

== Hiking / Geocaching ==
Sgurra Bhreac is a challenging but popular hiking/geocaching destination due to the view from its summit. From here one can see Sydney, Glace Bay, the Bras d'Or Lake, the Mira River and most of the Mira area, Loch Lomond, the Atlantic Ocean, and many other lakes, ridges, valleys and bogs.
