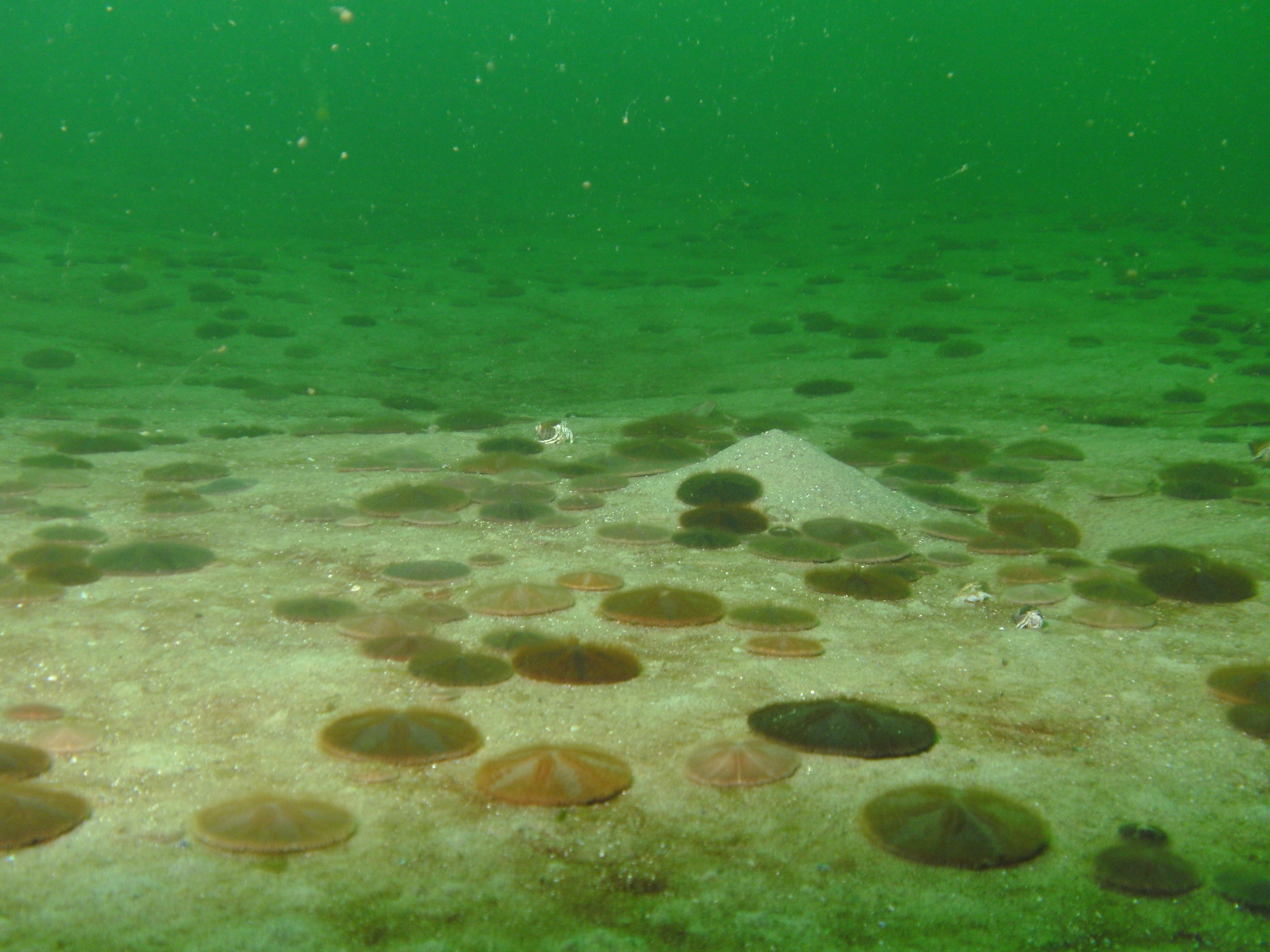

Conservation status
- Secure (NatureServe)

Scientific classification
- Kingdom: Animalia
- Phylum: Echinodermata
- Class: Echinoidea
- Order: Clypeasteroida
- Family: Echinarachniidae
- Genus: Echinarachnius
- Species: E. parma

Binomial name
- Echinarachnius parma Lamarck, 1816

Synonyms
- List: Echinarachinus parma (Lamarck, 1816) (misspelling); Echinarachnius atlanticus L. Agassiz, 1841 (subjective junior synonym); Echinarachnius australiae Michelin, 1859 (subjective junior synonym); Echinarachnius rumphii L. Agassiz, 1841 (subjective junior synonym); Echinarachnius undulatus Michelin, 1859 (subjective junior synonym); Echinodiscus parma (Lamarck, 1816) (transferred to Echinarachnius); Phelsumaster parma (Lamarck, 1816) (transferred to Echinarachnius); Phelsumia parma (Lamarck, 1816) (transferred to Echinarachnius); Scutella parma Lamarck, 1816 (transferred to Echinarachnius); Scutella trifara Say, 1826 (subjective junior synonym)

= Echinarachnius parma =

Common sand dollar

Species of sea urchin

Echinarachnius parma, the common sand dollar, is a species of sand dollar native to the Northern Hemisphere.

Subspecies

- Echinarachnius parma obesus H.L. Clark, 1914
- Echinarachnius parma parma (Lamarck, 1816)
- Echinarachnius parma sakkalinensis Argamakowa, 1934

== Distribution ==
It is found in the North Pacific and Northwest Atlantic, on the North American east coast from New Jersey north, as well as in Alaska, Siberia, British Columbia, and Japan. It inhabits isolated areas on sandy bottoms below the low tide level down to a depth of 5,000 feet (1,500 m).

== Description ==
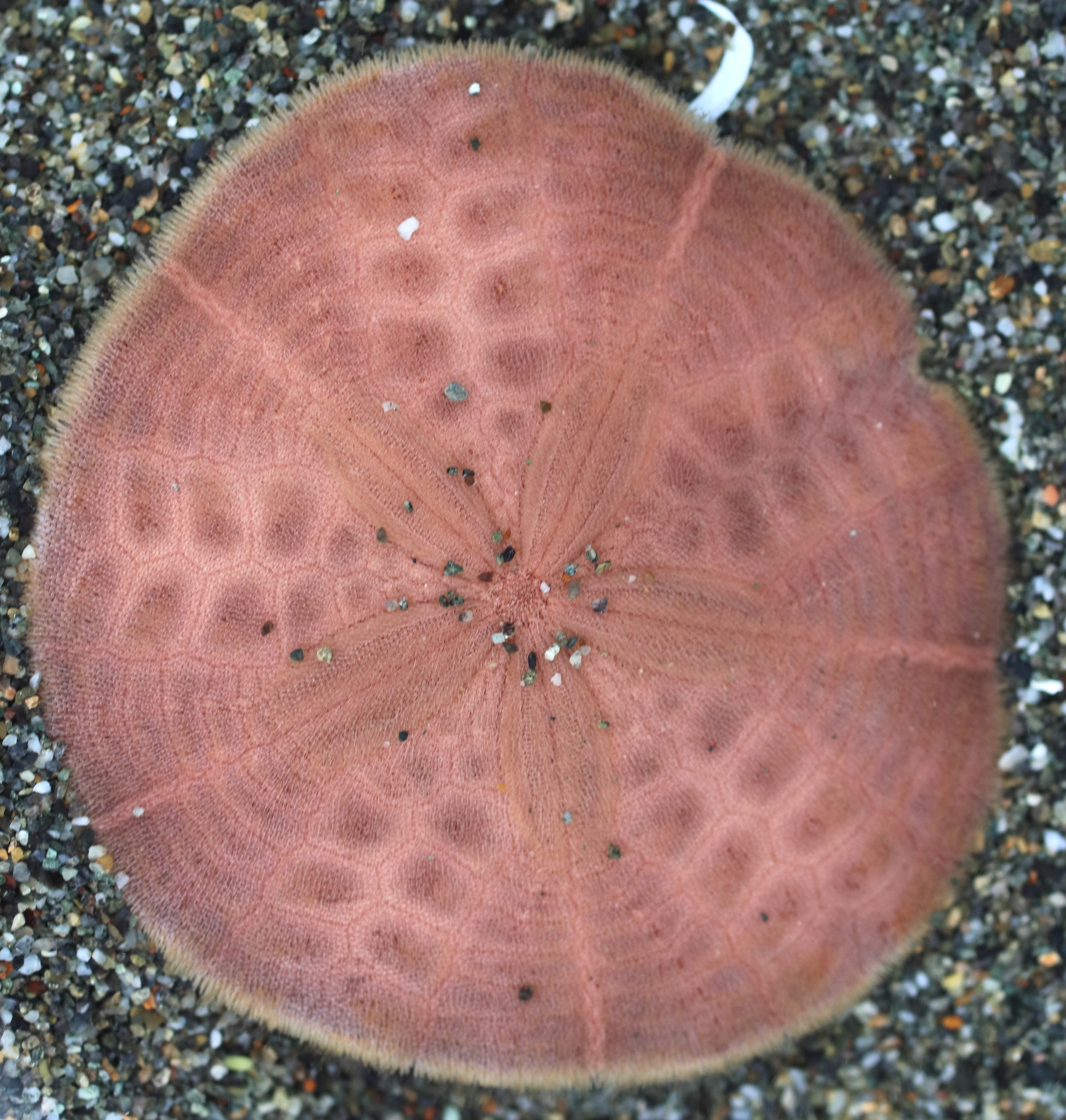
Living

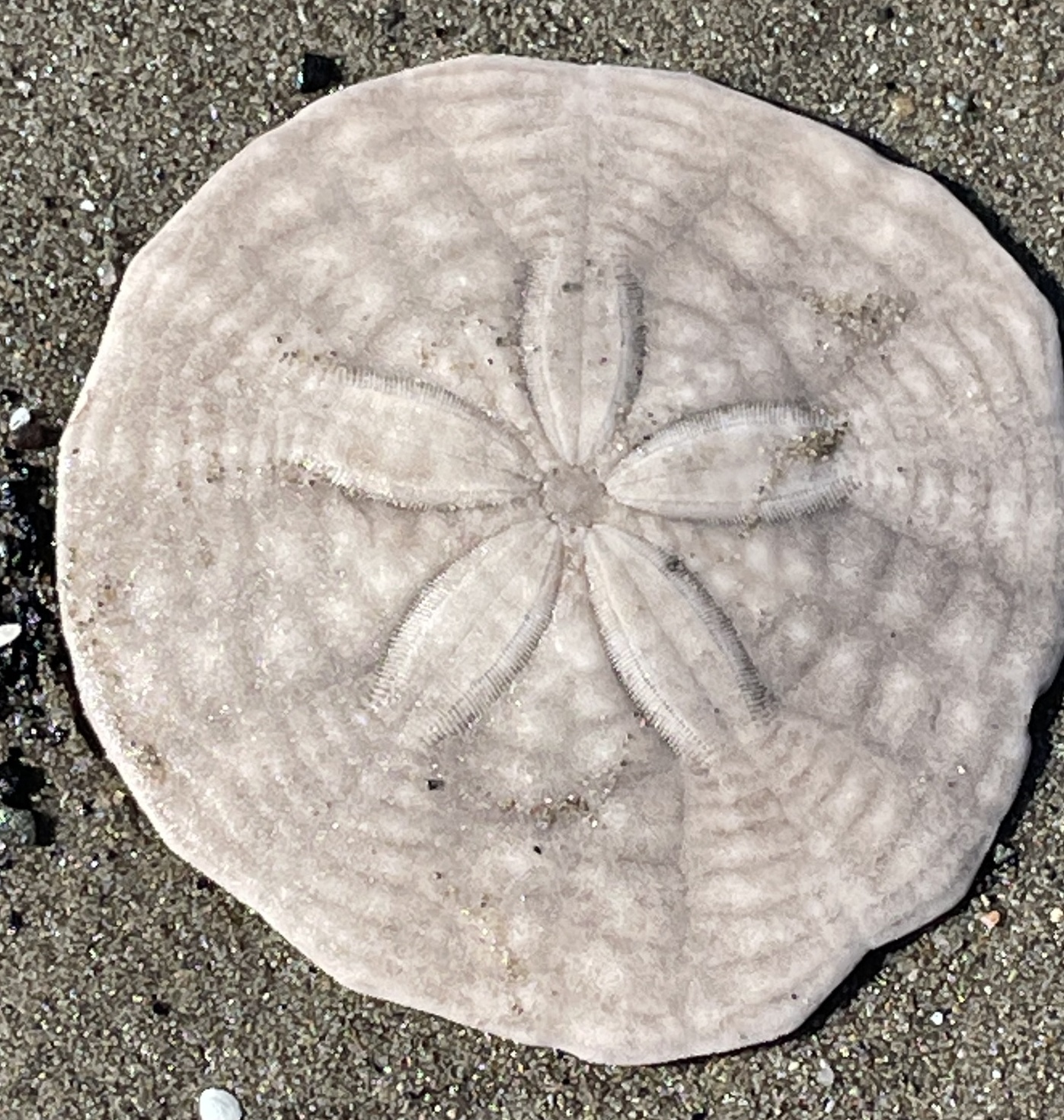
Dead (test)

The tests (shells) of these sand dollars are round, flat and disc-like, typically measuring 3 inches (7.6 cm) in diameter. The growth rate for this animal is between 3.5 and 6 mm/yr in the latter 5 years of their lifespan, and the lifespan is typically around 8 years. The entire shell is also covered with maroon-colored moveable spines. The color is a purplish brown, becoming bleached white when deceased and washed ashore. This color occurs due to only the hard, calcified exoskeleton remaining, with further bleaching by sun and saltwater as it reaches the shore. As in other echinoderms, they have five-fold radial symmetry, with a petal-shaped structure, or petalidium, on the aboral surface. The feet containing small hair-like structures (cilia) are located on this surface. The mouth, food grooves, and anus are located on the bottom side of the animal.

This and other species of Echinarachnius have been around since the Pliocene epoch.

== Feeding ==
In terms of feeding, sand dollars have suspension feeders that rely on a specialized structure called Aristotle's Lantern. Their cilia create grooves on the underside of their body that funnel food particles like plankton, detritus, and microscopic organisms toward their central mouth. Their interlocking teeth, known as "doves," work together to grind and process food. This feeding strategy allows them to extract nutrients from the surrounding sediment and water. They are opportunistic feeders.

== Reproduction ==
The reproductive strategy of the common sand dollar includes both sexual and asexual methods, with the latter being particularly fascinating. Sand dollars typically reproduce sexually through external fertilization, where eggs and sperm are released into the water column. However, under certain conditions, particularly in the larval stage, sand dollars exhibit a form of asexual reproduction.

When faced with predation threats, sand dollar larvae can reproduce asexually through budding or fission. This response allows the larvae to split into smaller clones, which are less detectable by predators. The process not only increases the larvae's chances of survival but also enhances the population's ability to persist in predator-rich environments. This strategy is thought to be an evolutionary adaptation to reduce predation pressure on vulnerable larvae.
