= St. Andrews Channel =

Community in Nova Scotia, Canada

Coordinates: 45°54′50.47″N 60°30′54.97″W

St. Andrews Channel in Nova Scotia

St. Andrews Channel is a community in the Canadian province of Nova Scotia, located in the Cape Breton Regional Municipality on Cape Breton Island.
