= Big Pond Centre =

Community in Nova Scotia, Canada

Coordinates: 45°53′35.86″N 60°33′56.2″W

Big Pond Centre in Nova Scotia

Big Pond Centre is a community in the Canadian province of Nova Scotia, located in the Cape Breton Regional Municipality on Cape Breton Island.
