= Irishvale =

Community in Cape Breton Island

Coordinates: 45°50′56.87″N 60°38′39.08″W

Irish Vale in Nova Scotia

Irishvale is a rural community in the Canadian province of Nova Scotia, located in the Cape Breton Regional Municipality on Cape Breton Island.
