= Middle Cape =

Community in Nova Scotia, Canada

Coordinates: 45°52′24.88″N 60°36′15.7″W

Middle Cape in Nova Scotia

Middle Cape is a community in the Canadian province of Nova Scotia, located in Cape Breton Regional Municipality on Cape Breton Island.
