= Castle Bay, Nova Scotia =

Community in Nova Scotia, Canada

Coordinates: 45°55′7.24″N 60°39′35.93″W

Castle Bay in Nova Scotia

Castle Bay (Mi'kmawi'simk: Apji'jkmujue'katik; Scottish Gaelic: Bàgh a' Chaisteil) is a community in the Canadian province of Nova Scotia, located in the Cape Breton Regional Municipality on Cape Breton Island.

The original Mi'kmaq placename, Apji'jkmujue'katik, means, "place of the ducks."
