= Northside East Bay =

Community in Nova Scotia, Canada

Coordinates: 45°59′55.5″N 60°26′24.3″W

Northside East Bay in Nova Scotia

Northside East Bay is a community in the Canadian province of Nova Scotia, located in the Cape Breton Regional Municipality on Cape Breton Island. Northside East Bay is located on the most Easterly end of the Bras d'or Lakes; about 15 miles west of the city of Sydney.
