= East Bay, Nova Scotia =

Community in Nova Scotia, Canada

East Bay
- Unincorporated community
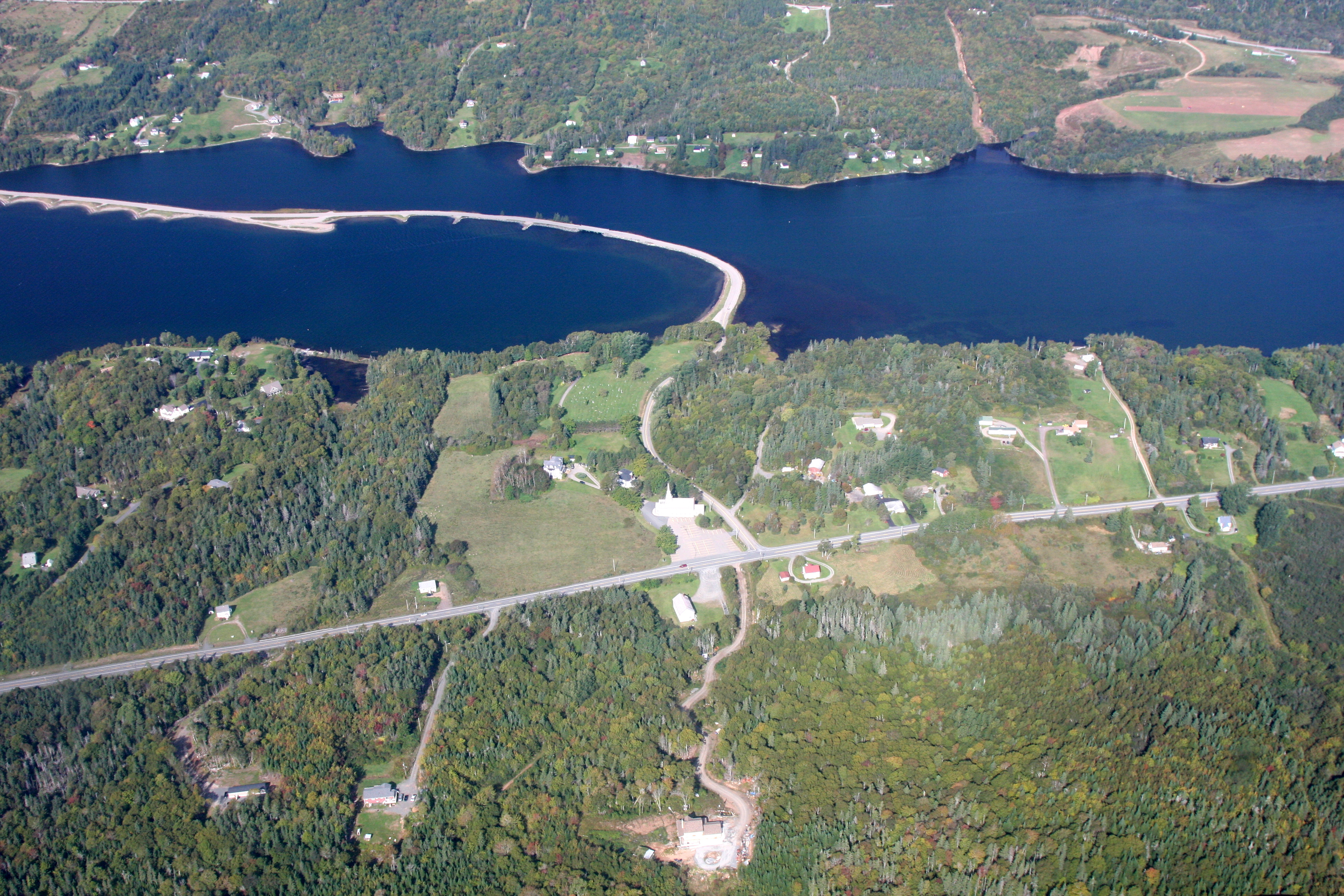
- St. Mary of the Assumption Church and the East Bay Sandbar and Beach.
- Interactive map of East Bay
- Coordinates: 46°0′46.58″N 60°23′3.45″W
- Country: Canada
- Province: Nova Scotia
- Regional municipality: Cape Breton Regional Municipality
- Time zone: UTC-4 (AST)
  - Summer (DST): UTC-3 (ADT)
- Forward sortation area: B1J
- Area codes: 902 and 782
- NTS Map: 011K01
- GNBC Code: CAKIX

East Bay is a community in the Canadian province of Nova Scotia, located in the Cape Breton Regional Municipality on Cape Breton Island. It is situated on the south side of the East Bay of the Bras d'Or Lake, from which it gets its name.

East Bay has a Catholic church, St. Mary of the Assumption Church, with mass every day at 10am and Saturday at 4pm. The community was the site of the College of East Bay (1824-1829) which was moved to Arichat and later Antigonish where it became St. Francis Xavier University. St FX later opened a branch in Cape Breton which became the University College of Cape Breton, later Cape Breton University. Until recently, East Bay had two elementary schools, reduced to one, and now both closed.
