= Island View, Nova Scotia =

Community in Nova Scotia, Canada

Coordinates: 45°57′45.81″N 60°33′33.18″W

Island View in Nova Scotia

Island View is a community in the Canadian province of Nova Scotia, located in the Cape Breton Regional Municipality on Cape Breton Island.
