= Waterloo, Nova Scotia =

Community in Nova Scotia, Canada

Coordinates: 44°19′31″N 64°41′22″W

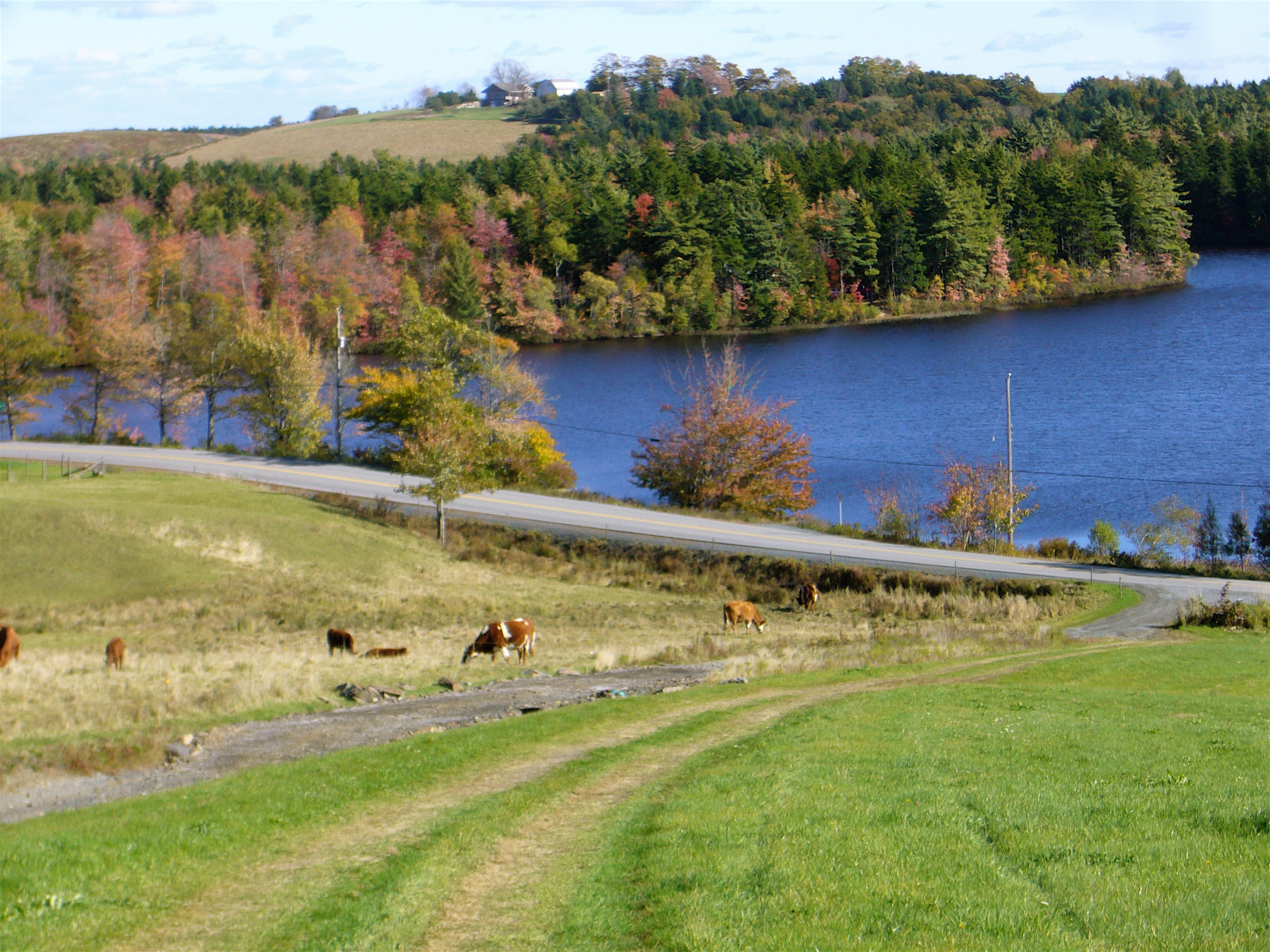
Looking across Matthew Lake from the Allan Wile Hill to the Isaac Wile Hill, Waterloo, Nova Scotia. Allan was the son of Isaac. The practice of building homes and clearing land on the tops of drumlins was the standard settler practice. Both these hills are approximately 125 metres above sea level. A narrow isthmus separates Matthew Lake from Frederick Lake. The Adelbert Wile road runs through this connecting the hills.

Waterloo is a small community in the Canadian province of Nova Scotia, located in western Lunenburg County. The community extends approximately 10 kilometers from Route 210 to the Queens County line and is 20 kilometers from the commercial hub of Bridgewater. The Waterloo Road runs through the community providing a picturesque alternative to Route 210 when travelling between Newcombville and Greenfield.

== History ==
=== First Peoples and the newcomers ===
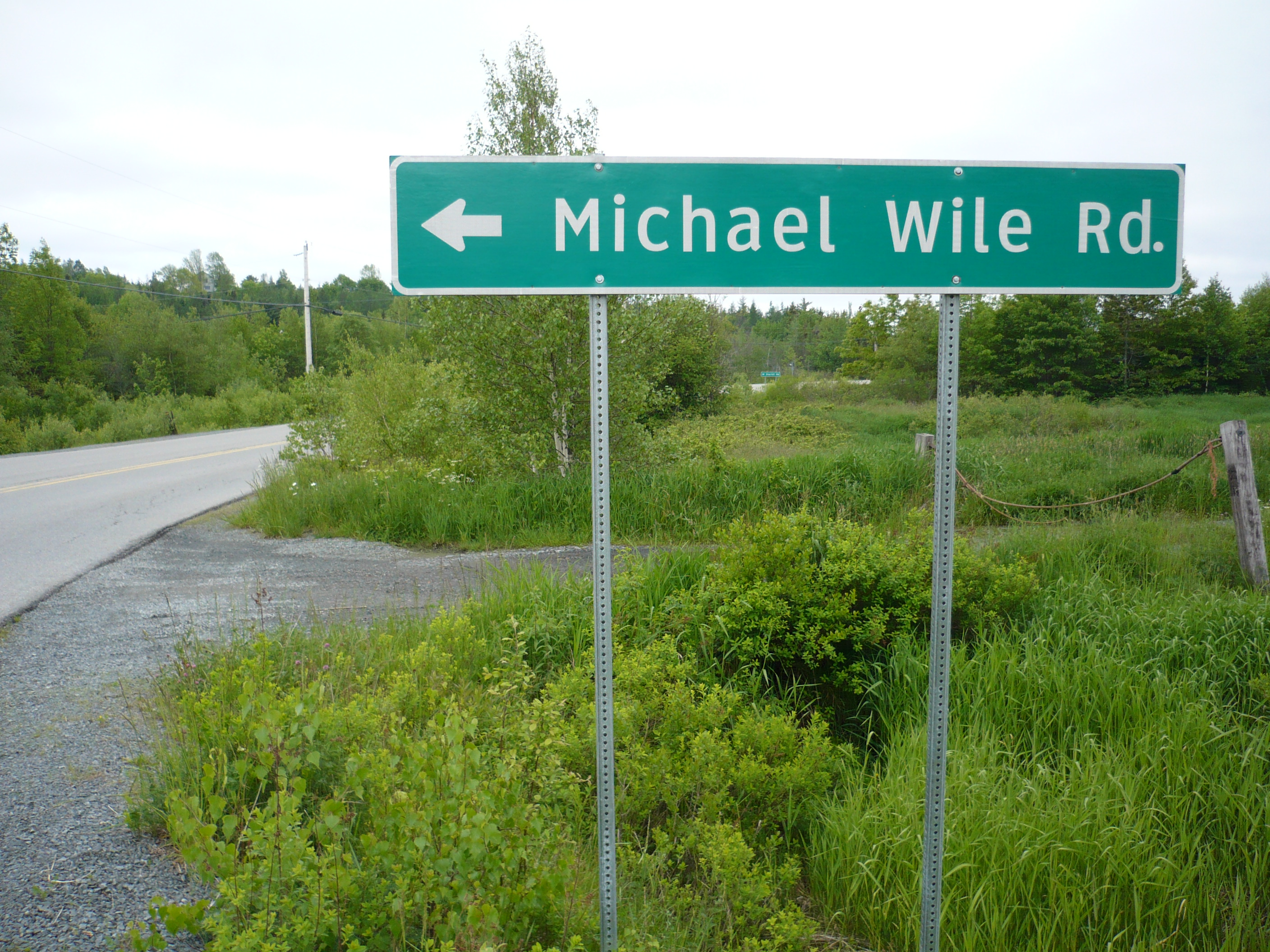
The Michael Wile Road is the new name for the former Veinot Road and reflects the original colonists Michael and Lucy Wile. St. Clair Veinot and his wife Sadie Wile Veinot owned and lived in the Michael Wile home place after Michael and Lucy passed on.

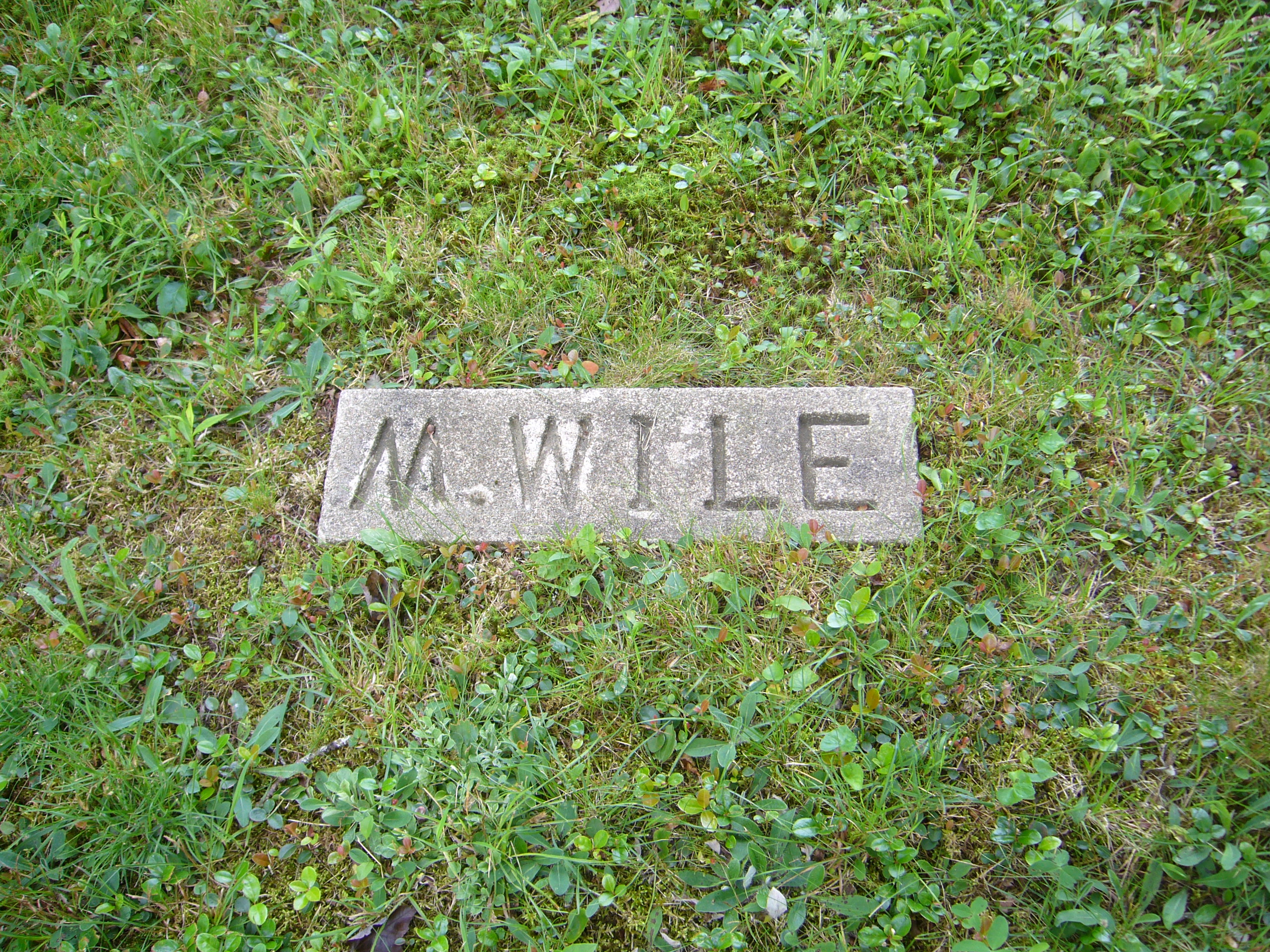
The gravesite of George "Michael" Wile, one of Susannah Fiendel Wile's eight boys; husband to Lucy Salome Hirtle Wile.

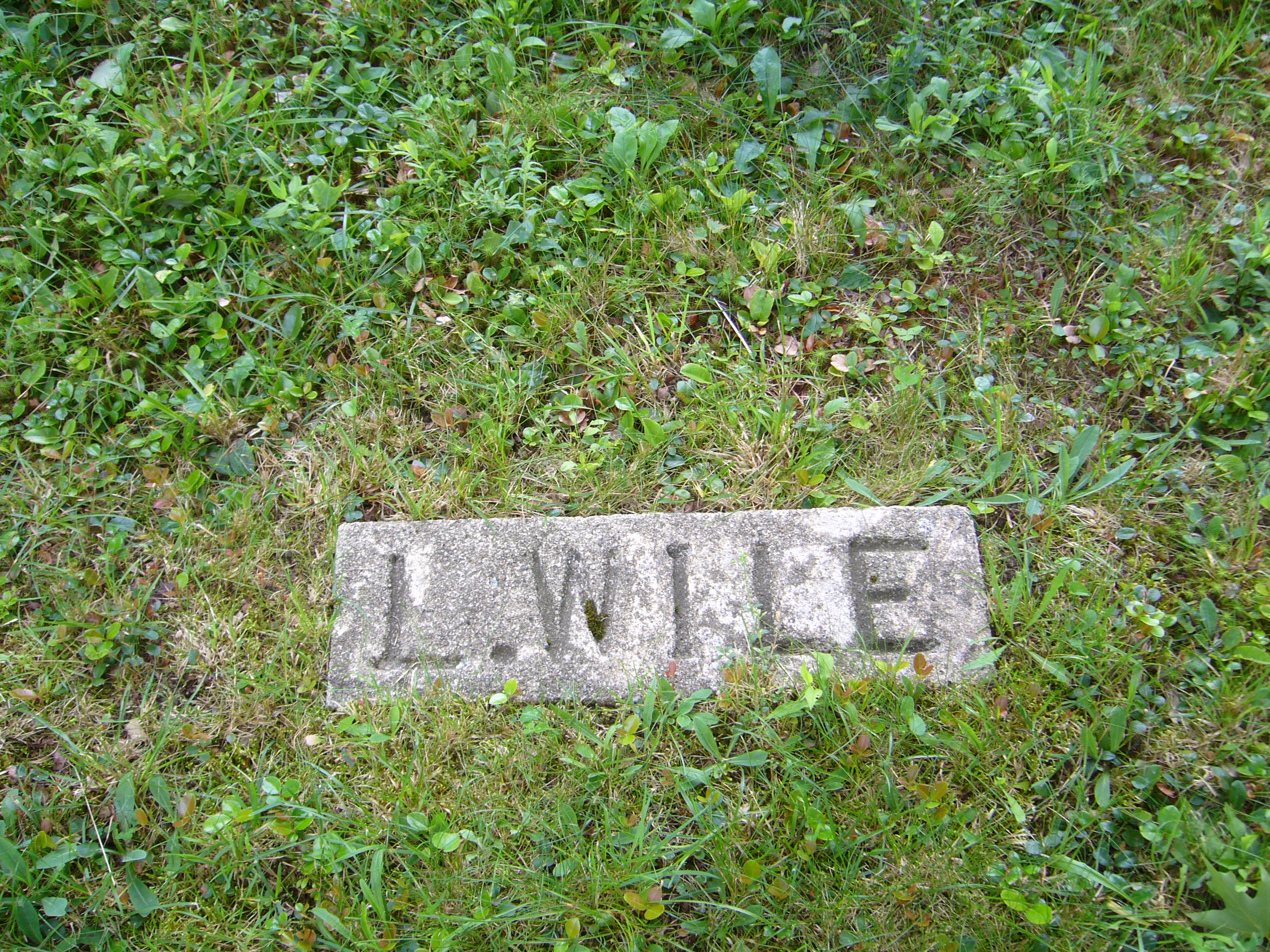
The gravesite of "Lucy" Salome Hirtle Wile, one of Michael Hirtle's seven daughters; wife of George "Michael" Wile.

Western Lunenburg County was shared by aboriginal Mi'kmaq people before the first European settlers arrived. In an 1894 interview, George Michael Wile (1809–1895) and his wife Lucinda Hirtle Wile, the first European settlers in the Waterloo area, spoke about the early days of the settlement when "Indians" camped on a brook in the area, "catching otter, mink, and other animals for fur" (DesBrisay, 1895). Some time before 1870, when early deeds show transfers of land in the community, the first settlers received large land grants of 50 to 150-acre parcels from Great Britain before and around the time of Canadian Confederation.

=== Historical perspectives ===
The European roots of the community are predominantly from small German states which are comprised by the Germany of today and from the region known as Montbéliard in eastern France. Waterloo Settlement's first settlers were sons and daughters of second and third-generation German and Montbéliardian immigrants brought to Nova Scotia as loyal citizens to the British crown in 1750–52. The French-speaking Montbéliardians were considered good candidates to emigrate since they were known to be "very frugal, as well as strong independent laborers" (Withrow, 2002). As for the Germans (and likely the Swiss), Judge Debrisay quotes a number of stereotypes and impressions that developed and existed of the first German immigrants up to 1895, at least 140 years after their arrival. "They are a big, square-shouldered, deep-chested race. They do not talk much, but look as though they thought—easy going, and good tempered... they are hearty eaters, but they are not fussy and finikin over their food... so long as the dish is wholesome, and there is sufficient of it, they are satisfied... in the sensuous arts of painting and sculpture, the Germans are poor. In the ennobling arts of literature and music they are great, and this fact provides a key to their character. They are simple, earnest, homely, genuine people. They do not laugh much, but when they do they laugh deep down. They are slow, but so is a deep river... . The Germans believe in themselves, and respect themselves".

=== Historical significance of the region ===
Waterloo in Nova Scotia

These German, Swiss, and French settlers arrived just prior to the tumultuous years when Nouvelle France was being defeated by the British, resulting in the first Treaty of Paris (1763). Many Acadians were expelled in 1755 and these German Protestant immigrants initially were the new population sought to outbalance the French and Mi'kmaq influence in the region—both of which were Catholic (Withrow, 2002). There was at least another connection between these Acadians and the Germans. Because there was a food shortage in the Lunenburg area where the German settlers were granted their first land, the British encouraged them to travel to the Acadians' newly seized and vacated land in what is now the Annapolis Valley and herd their abandoned livestock back to Lunenburg. Between July 30 and September 3, 1756, 282 of the settlers were involved in the drive by either retrieving the animals or tending to the chores of those who went. Three of those surnames involved were later to be prominent Waterloo names: Krause, Vienot, and Weil. The community was also settled by a Black Loyalist by the surname of Lavender. L & E Lavender received a grant of land south of Matthew Lake and farmed it as did the other settlers.

=== German and Montbéliardian community roots: Wile, Hirtle, Crouse, and Veinot ===
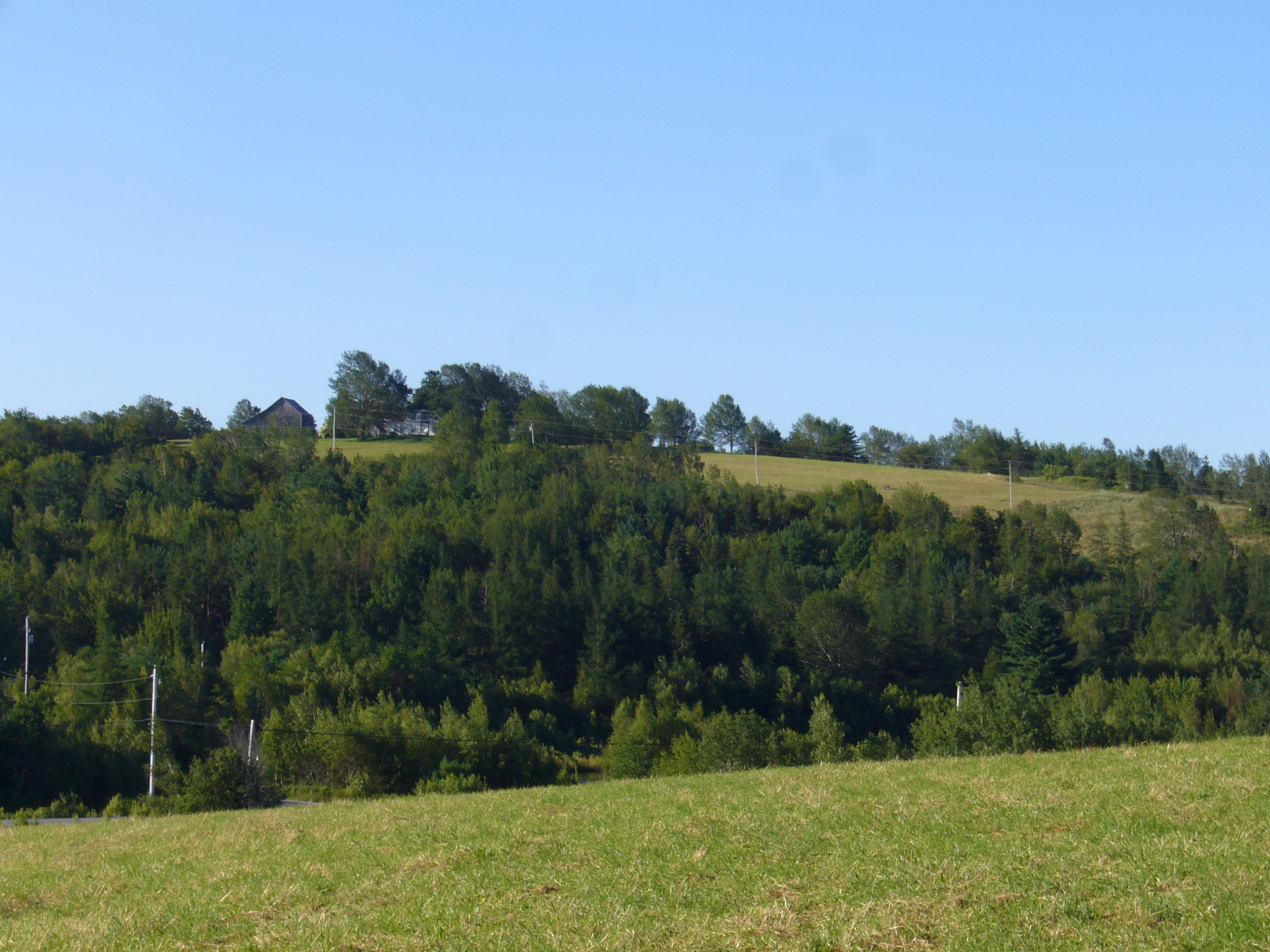
On the horizon is the original drumlin cleared by George "Michael" Wile and his wife Lucinda "Lucy" Hirtle. This hill is the one Lucy refers to from the early days of the settlement when she speaks of spreading a quilt between the stumps to place her basket of children on, and then another quilt above them for shade, when she was "reaping and doing other work".

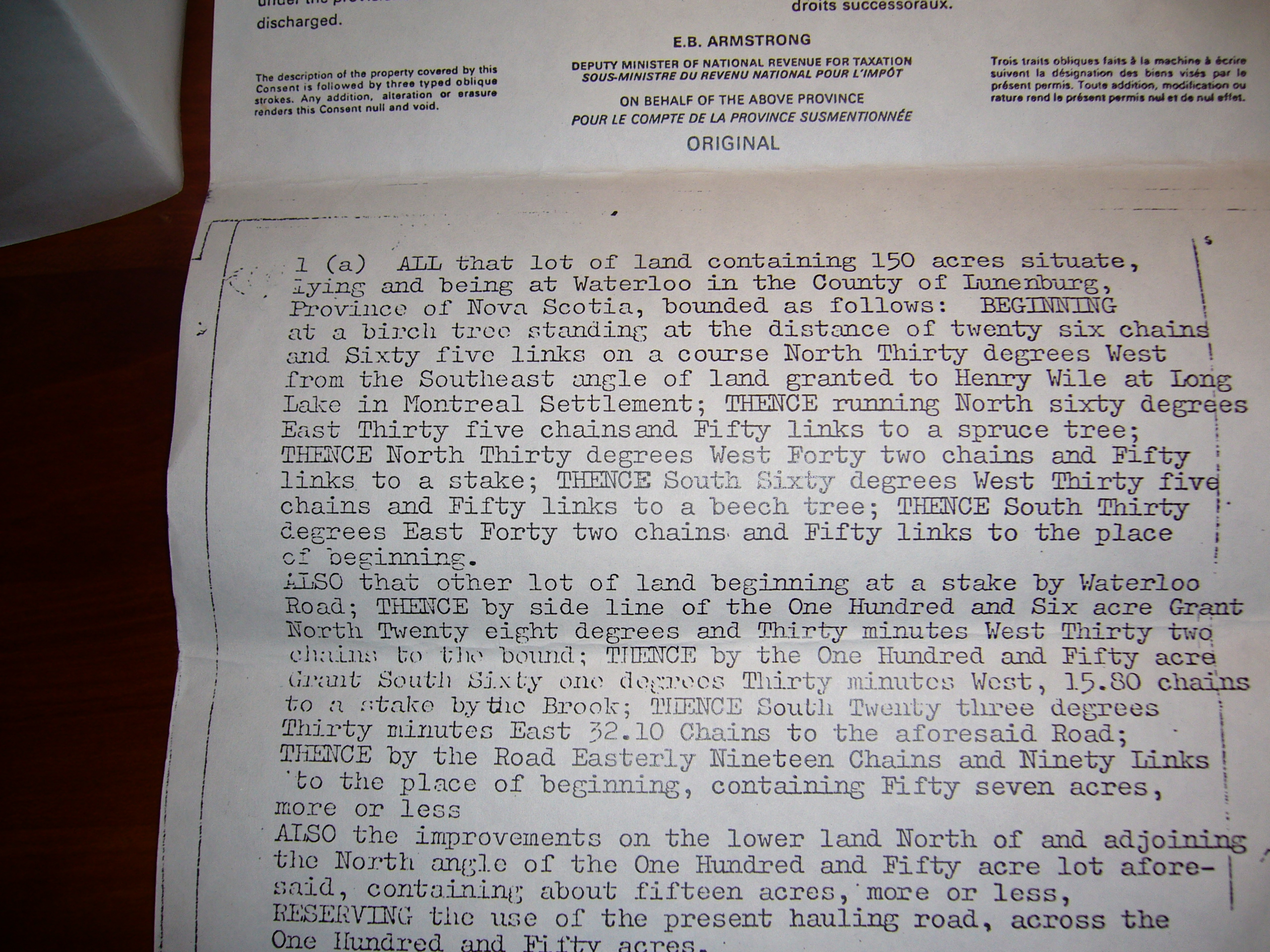
This primary source gives evidence of the use of the name "Montreal Settlement" in reference to west Waterloo at Long Lake in the 1890s. The origin of this name or even the use of the name is unknown to present Waterloo residents.

The first European inhabitant of the community was George "Michael" Wile (grandson of Frederick "Weil", who arrived in 1750 on the ship Ann and his wife, Lucinda Salome Hirtle (great granddaughter of Hans Michael Hirtle who came in 1751 on the ship Pearl), Michael Hirtle's daughter from nearby Newcombville. Michael Wile's grant of 170 acres (0.69 km^{2}) included the highest drumlin in the area, overlooking Mack Lake (later renamed "Matthew Lake"), which he cleared to build his home and break up for cropland.

Michael was soon followed by George Hirtle (DesBrisay, 1895), who eventually was granted 600 acres (2.4 km^{2}) in total in the Long Lake area. According to an 1892 deed, the most westerly portion of the community around Long Lake was called "Montreal Settlement." The third man to arrive was his brother, James Hirtle, who was granted a total of 364 acres (1.47 km^{2}) south of Long Lake and north of the Waterloo Road, also in the Montreal Settlement area. Michael's nephews Absalom (1831–1892) and Henry Wile (1817–1889) soon were granted land in the same area, 735 acres (2.97 km^{2}) and 100 acres (0.40 km^{2}) respectively. In one example, Charles Tupper, later to become the sixth Prime Minister of Canada, in his role as the provincial secretary granted Absalom Wile 150 acres (0.61 km^{2}) of his final 735 in 1858 while Nova Scotia was still a colony.

Michael's brothers joined him in the settlement area. George (1804–1880) was granted 250 acres (1.0 km^{2}) in the most eastern part of the settlement around Fire Lake and St. George Lake; William (1813–1900) and Isaac (1825–1914) were granted land in the Mack Lake area gaining 194 and 325 acres (1.32 km^{2}) respectively and sharing a 200 grant. Mack Wile (the lake's namesake) was the grandson of William.

Through intermarriage with the first settlers, other surnames became prominent in the community such as the Montbéliardian Veinot (from Leopold Vienot who arrived on the ship "Betty" in 1752 and Crouse (Hans George Krause, arrived in 1752 on the 1752 ship Gale or John Jacob Krause, Ship Pearl, 1752). Absalom's daughter Lois married William Roxway Crouse. Absalom's granddaughter Sadie Wile married Albert St. Clair Veinot.

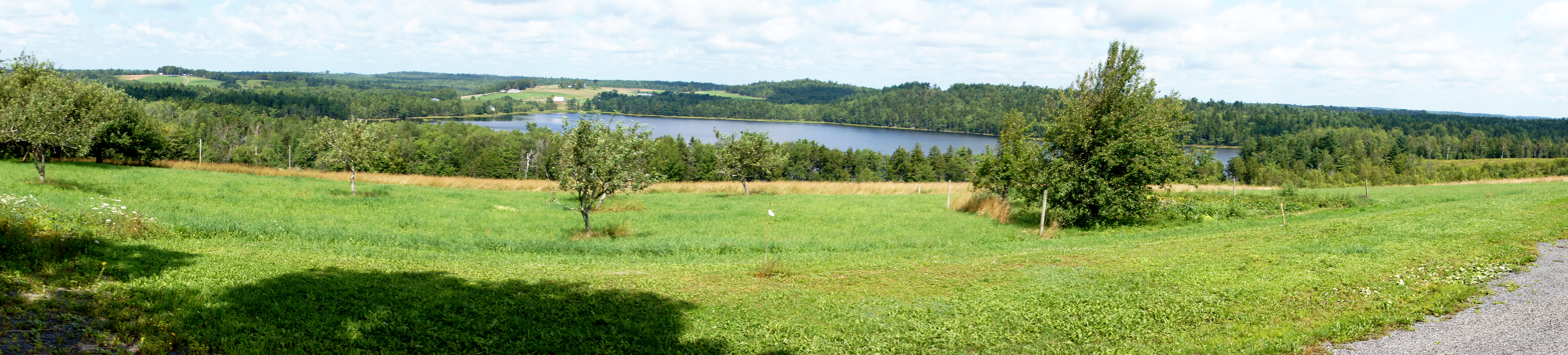
Overlooking Frederick Lake from the Isaac Wile Hill. The Allan Wile Hill is on left horizon and the William Wile Hill is just left of center. Allen was the son of Isaac and William was Isaac's brother.

=== Earliest marked grave: Susannah E. Fiendel Wile ===
Isaac Wile's grave site—the youngest of Susannah's children—in the middle and George Wile (father of Dean Wile of Wile's Carding Mill) and his wife Mary Ann Hirtle in the right background with their mother Susannah in the left background. Note the former school, now community hall, in the background.

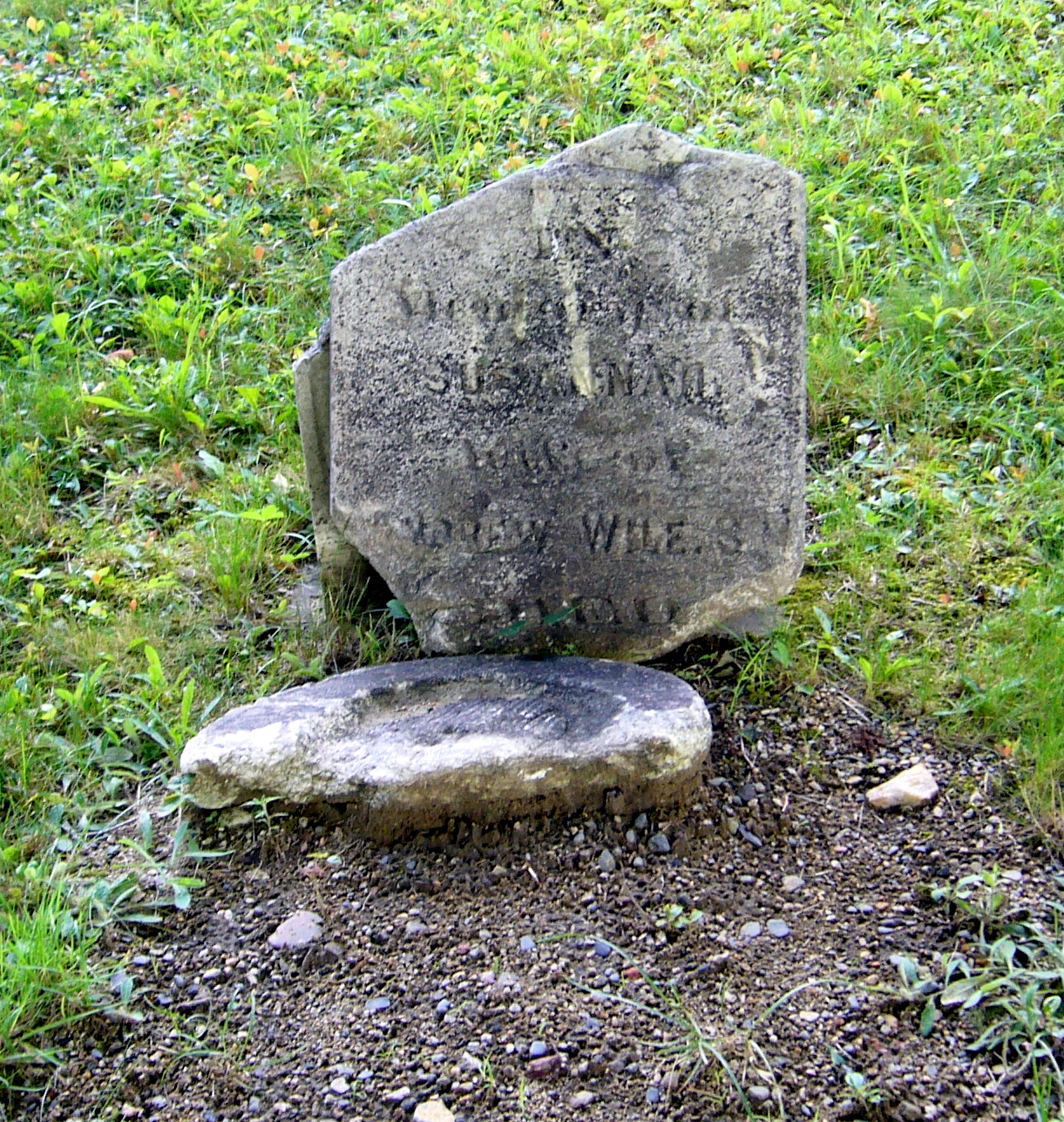
Susannah Fiendel Wile's (1786–1878) gravesite, Waterloo, Nova Scotia. This grave is within meters of her sons George, Michael, William, Isaac, and David whose grave is unmarked.

The most broken-down gravestone in the Waterloo Cemetery is that of Susanna E. Fiendel Wile (1786–1878). She was the wife of Andrew Wile, Sr. (1758–1832). Her gravestone shows a recorded age of 92 years, 8 months. The presence of her grave is a significant link to the 18th century when the town of Lunenburg was a fledgling community and Bridgewater was only an idea. Susanna was the second wife of Andrew Wile Sr., who was the first of two sons born to Johann (John) Friederich [Frederick] Weil [Wile], the progenitor of the Wiles of Nova Scotia. This Johann Friederich Weil came from Lützellinden, Germany, today a suburb of Gießen, a city in North Hesse. Andrew's oldest son (from his first wife Regina Gertzen, today "Getson") John Frederick, built the second house built in Bridgewater along with his brother Garrett, and framed by John Vienot (DesBrisay, 1895). With the passing of Regina Getson, Andrew Sr. at 46, married Susanna E. Fiendel who was 19. She became the stepmother of the 6 of Andrew's 11 previous children who were still living, two of whom were older than Susannah. Susanna had ten more children of her own (research seems to indicate 11 children). It was her step-grandsons, Absalom and Henry who were granted the land in Montreal Settlement. It was her sons Michael, William, and Isaac who settled near Waterloo calling the area Waterloo Settlement, likely closely associated with their brother George's nearby location of Waterloo, today where the junction of the Waterloo Rd and the Trunk 201 are located. Her grandson Dean Wile started the Wile Carding Mill in Bridgewater and also donated the land for Brookside Cemetery in Bridgewater. The presence of Susannah Fiendel Wile's grave in the Waterloo Cemetery indicates that she may have spent her last years with her sons and their families in Waterloo Settlement instead of in Wileville where her husband Andrew Sr. and she had lived together. Church records and headstones show that Susannah was buried in the same Waterloo Cemetery as her step-son Philip, and her sons, George, Michael, William, David, and Isaac.

=== Eight Hirtles marry eight Wiles ===
John "Michael" Hirtle (1786–1840) and his wife Anna Maria Rhuland lived in the nearby community of Newcombville and ran a saw mill with George Hirtle in the early 19th century (Desbrisay, 1895). Michael and Anna Maria's seven daughters all married Wiles—even one of their sons, George Benjamin Hirtle (b. 1814) married one of the boys' sisters, Sophia Dorothea Wile, and was quite likely the second person to come to Waterloo Settlement (Desbrisay, 1895). Michael's firstborn, a daughter Mary Ann (b. 1810) married Andrew and Susanna Fiendel Wile's oldest boy, John George. George's brother, George "Michael", Waterloo Settlement's first settler of European descent, married Mary Ann's sister Louise Salome (b. 1813). William, another brother of George's married Catherine (b. 1819), another Hirtle sister. David, a nephew of George (from George's older brother Johannes) married Marie Elizabeth (b. 1816), yet another sister.

These brothers' oldest half-brother, John Frederick Wile (oldest son of Andrew and his first wife, Regina Getson), had seven sons, three of whom married the rest of Michael Hirtle's daughters: Henry, John, and James. Henry Wile married Sophia Amelia (b. 1822); John married Sarah Ann (b. 1824); and finally James married Barbara Caroline (b. 1826), the last of the seven sisters.

Most of these Hirtle–Wile marriages constituted the first of Waterloo Settlement families. George farmed at the junction of the Waterloo Rd and Chelsea Rd; George "Michael" on the highest hill overlooking Matthew Lake (called "Mack Lake" in the 1880s AF Church map); William's farm overlooked Frederick Lake; Sophia and George farmed in the Montreal Settlement-Long Lake area; and Henry and Sophia were granted land overlooking Long Lake, but likely did not farm there, selling the land to his brother Absalom.

== Education ==
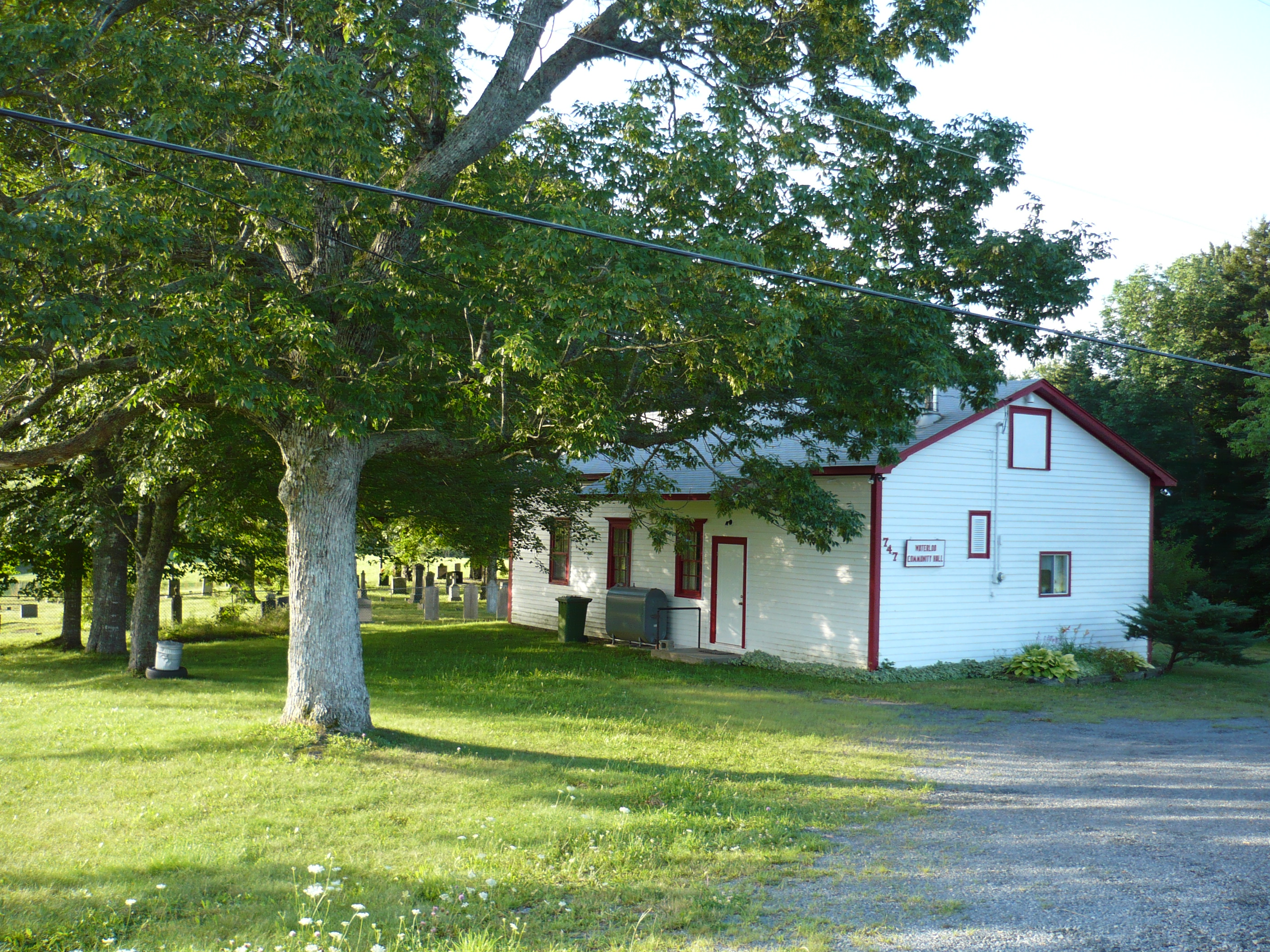
This building has served as school and now community center since it was first built in the c. 1860s.

George "Michael" Wile spoke to the beginnings of education in Waterloo Settlement. A Mr. James Dowling's father taught school in Michael's house for a couple of winters, periodically walking the 70-kilometre round trip from his home in Lunenburg. The need to have a real school building for the few students that lived in the settlement was solved with quick action; a new 18 × 20-foot (6.1 m) school building was erected in eight days and on the ninth "the teacher and scholars met in it and commenced the school". (Desbrisay, 1895) The project was entirely community built from the sawing of the lumber to the framing and interior preparations.

By the Act of 1864, Nova Scotia was divided into local school sections (Woods, 1936). As early as 1894, the Waterloo School was one of those sections known as Waterloo School Section No. 92 (Waterloo, 1894). School board meeting minutes from 1895–97 speak to the deliberations over whether to enforce the Compulsory School Act. The motion to enforce the Act was defeated at each of these three annual meetings. Generally during those early years, most of the resolutions put forward involved the school building and maintenance; the letting of contracts for "fire making" and provision of firewood were common themes (Waterloo, 1894–98). Each year considerable meeting time was spent in the nomination of board members and trustees. Students travelled by foot to school. For those from Montreal Settlement, the four kilometer round trip was difficult in the winter (Hubley, 2002). The last year the Waterloo School operated was 1959–60. After that, Grade 1–8 students were bussed to the Wileville School and Grades 8–12 to Hebbville School. Some teachers who served over the years were Maggie Herman from 1893–1895; Blanche Whitman, 1896–97; D. Marie Sarty, 1929–1931; Roger Sarty, 1934–35; Cora Wile, 1935–36; and Shirley Fraser, 1950-?). School salaries ranged from $100 a year in 1896 to $325 by 1936. In the early 1960s, a K-6 school was built in Newcombville for area students including children from Waterloo.

Another education entity in the community was the Department of Agriculture organization known as 4-H. A club was started in the early 1950s in the Waterloo school, mostly as a garden club with approximately five members. In the 1960s, the club amalgamated with the Lapland 4-H Garden Club. Finally in 1971, the clubs separated and the Waterloo 4-H Club was reestablished with 13 members. The members were required to write and make public speeches; enter agricultural exhibits in the South Shore Exhibition; compete in judging events of agricultural products; and show the handling of cattle and horses in the exhibition rings.

== Religion ==
The St. Michael's Church in earlier 1900s. Notice the quality of the main road in the foreground.

The community has held a variety of religious persuasions with Lutheran and Baptist being the most common. St. Michael's Lutheran Church was organized on March 12, 1889 under the leadership of Rev. F. A. Kohlse. For ten years the congregation met in the hall built on the second floor above of the schoolhouse (the hall was used every fifth Sunday by the Baptists) (Veinot, 2008). In c. 1899, the congregation built and dedicated a church across the road from the school. During the month of July 1939, the church was renovated and redecorated. The members supplied the labor and the many gifts and memorials that were unveiled in a rededication ceremony on July 28, 1939. Rev. Douglas A. Conrad, the pastor of the Waterloo church, hosted the many visitors and guest speakers during the five days of celebration. (Bridgewater, 1939)

The continuity of the Lutheran faith is still evident today in the community although change has occurred over the years. This adherence to the faith and a continuing desire for a local place of worship was evident in the results of the vote taken at the Planning Committee (c. 1969) that addressed the potential merger of five regional congregations. During that vote, only 20% of the St. Michael's representatives approved of the merger. Nevertheless, the amalgamation took place with the majority of approval (approximately 51%) of the voting representatives of the five churches. The new All Saints Lutheran Church in Newcombville formalized the future meeting place of the region's Lutherans (Resolutions, 1969). St. Michael's was dismantled in the early 1970s. The church's bell has been permanently mounted next to the cemetery.

== Language ==
English is the first language of the community and county. As with most regions in the Canada, dialects exist. Some interesting dialectal forms of words and unique phrases are spoken in the community and county at large—sometimes known as "Lunenburg English". Although these uses are not universal, they are widespread. Some words are spoken without a conventional hard "r" consonant such as "ova" (over), "hause" (horse), "aw" (our), and "ca" (car). Others are spoken with an unconventional use of vowels such as "tamarra" (tomorrow), "sure" (sure pronounced the shore), and "ta" (to). Some contractions and word clips have been created to accommodate those missing in the English language such as "daren't" (dare not), "'mon" (come on), and "'bout" (about).

Sometimes little-known words are used such as "chesterfield" (for sofa), or "scrooch" with "oo" sounding like foot (scrooch oo's normally pronounced like "too"—means to bend or cower) to describe the movements of an animal or futile human efforts; or the use of right in "right sultry" weather as to say it is "certainly" sultry (where right is used in the fashion of "right enough" or "undeniably" right). One phrase, to "be short-taken" (meaning the sudden and unplanned need to find a restroom), appears to be borrowed from the British phrase, to "be taken short" or "caught short."

A number of new words and phrases have found their way into the vernacular as well. For example, cutting wood into pieces or chunks is "junking it up" (perhaps from "chunking it up"); standing with one's back toward someone is "standing back to"; babies sometimes "crex" (perhaps akin to the Deitsch Grex, meaning a whimper or a creaking sound) and cry (whimper or whine); and "squauze" as the past tense for squeeze; and a "sneaky" person is someone who is a picky eater.

== Longevity ==
The community has shared in the longevity trend that statisticians say exists disproportionally in the County of Lunenburg compared to other world statistics. Absalom Wile's stepmother, Susannah Fiendel, lived to be 92. One son of Absalom Wile, Wiswell Wile, had a daughter, Ella Hintz (1900–2003) from Wileville who lived to be 103.

== Remnants of German culture: yokes and sauerkraut ==
The first German settlers came to Lunenburg County 268 years ago. Little remains of the German language and cultural practices. However, a few German implements and foods linger. The German head yoke is still used for yoking oxen at showmanship pulls and the German claw hoe can still be found in various tool sheds. German sauerkraut is cut from cabbage and turnip. Another food is the Lunenburg sausage made from ground pork and beef, spiced with coriander and stuffed into the entrails of the hog. The pudding version is spiced with summer savory and then cooked (Veinot, 2008).

== The arrival of modern conveniences ==
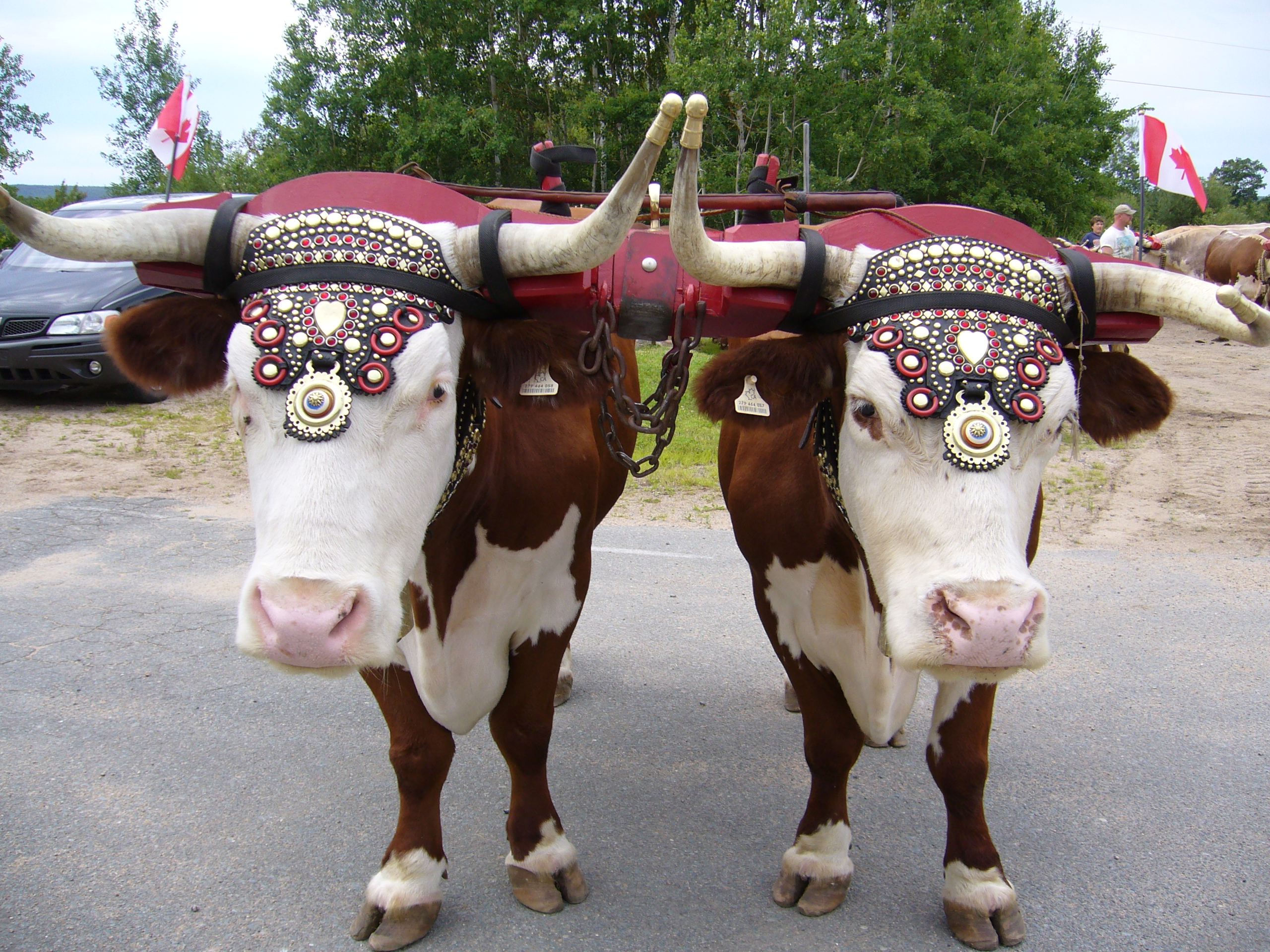
The German head yoke. The German head yoke was similar to the Acadian head yoke in that both attached to the head at the horns. The alternative was the New England bow yoke that rested loosely on the necks of the oxen. These two Hereford oxen are about to be led in a summer parade.

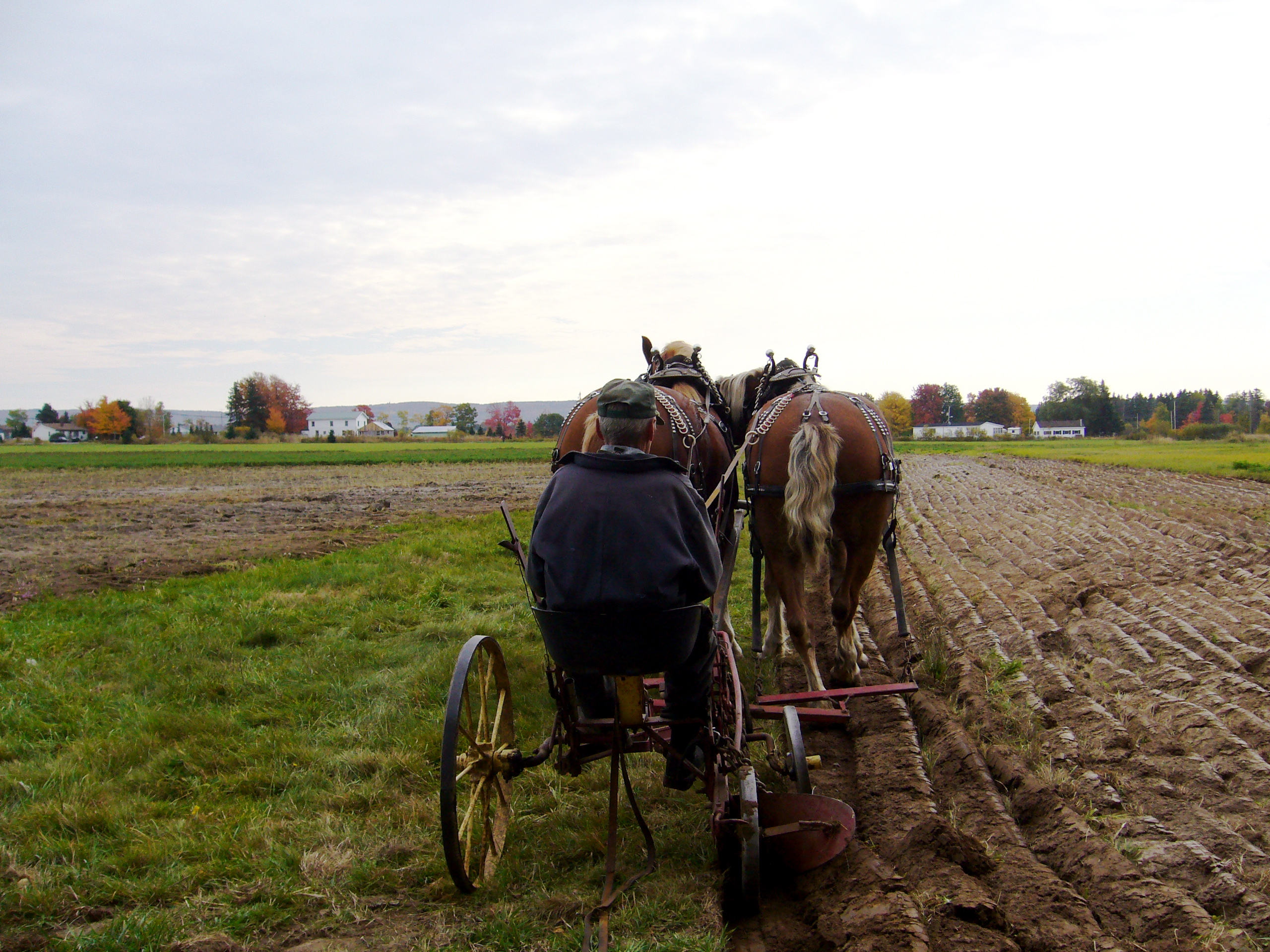
Here Kate and Lady, a Belgian team, is still worked in the Annapolis Valley. The last draft horse in Waterloo to provide the horsepower for cultivation was Bill, a black Belgian in west Waterloo in 1968.

Massey Harris tractors arrived in the community in the 1950s. The power source for most farm work in the community prior to this was either horse or ox teams. The German yoke (narrower and strapped closely to the horns) was used to harness the oxen's power to the horns similarly to the Acadian style of yoke (wider and flatter resting more on the neck). In the major agricultural areas of Nova Scotia, the draft horse eventually replaced the oxen. The last known draft horse to work the land was "Bill", a black Belgian owned by Ivan Wile. Today oxen and horse teams are a traditional icon of Lunenburg County heritage. "Pulls" are well-attended events in the South Shore Exhibition at Bridgewater each summer.

Electricity did not arrive in Waterloo until the 1950s. The entire line was installed during the winter of 1949–50 and on one day in April at 4:30 PM residents saw all the lights come on in the homes that had been wired. Prior to that, kerosene lamps were used in the house and lanterns with rags in fat or kerosene were used for chores.

Within a year of the electric power installation, telephone line was strung as well on the same poles. A "party line" system was used where a contact was made with another person in the party by turning a handle (or later a dial) on the side or face of the box a certain combination of one or two short or long rings. Privacy was afforded on an honor system where if the line was already in use by someone in the party, the "receiver" was placed back on the hook and the would-be caller tried later.

The "dirt" road that served the community for over 100 years was paved in the 1980s. Because the road needed proper sloping and drainage, it had been subject to frost heaves and became practically impassable in the spring. More than once school buses became mired in the middle of the road and required towing from other buses or tractors as late as the 1970s. Beginning in 1983, the road was widened, raised, ditched and finally paved in four stages: Highway 210 to the Veinot Rd; Veinot Rd to the Bolivar Rd; Bolivar Rd to Long Lake; and finally Long Lake to the Queens County line by 1987.

== Physical features of the land ==
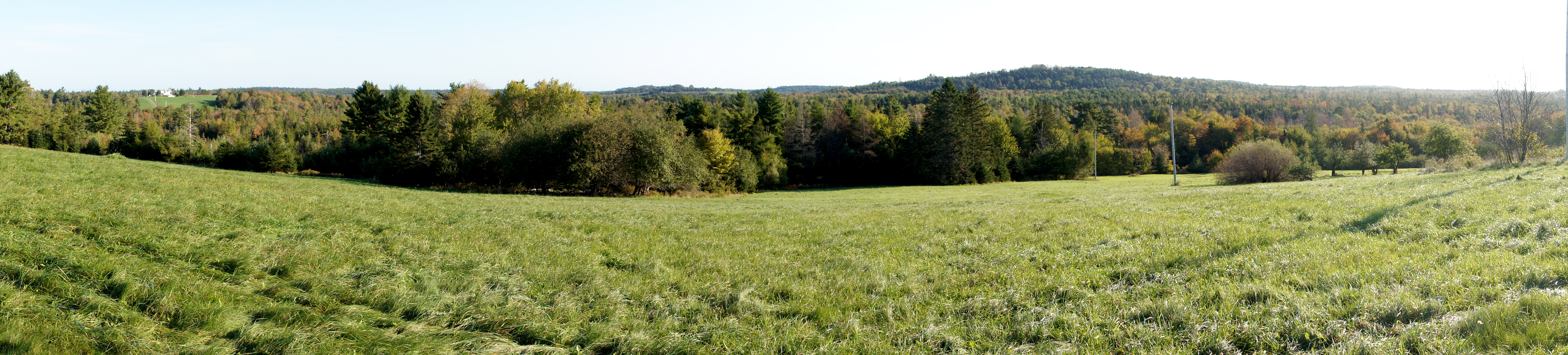
Drumlins, or little hills formed by glacial action, are a key feature in this and other communities in Lunenburg County. Here on the left is the "James Hirtle Hill" and on the right is the "Michael Wile Hill". The image is being taken from the "Bolivar Hill."

The dominant physical features of the community are cleared drumlins, wetlands known as "swamps" and three lakes: Frederick Lake, Matthew Lake (earlier Mack Lake, likely after George Wile's grandson Daniel "Mack" Wile, later named Matthew possibly after Matthew Carver, a landholder near the western edge of the lake), and Long Lake. The drumlins provided the best cultivatable land to the original settlers who grew fodder and commercial crops. One large wetland is known as the Turner Bog. Though the land was too wet for farming and roads, it was granted to the Nova Scotia Central Railway (see more at Halifax and Southwestern Railway) to provide wood for infrastructure and possible line expansion (Cameron, 1999).

== Living with the land: quilts and stumps ==
The task of clearing the settlement's first land was one of a studied process. The first task was to cut and gather into piles what they called the "underwood" (now called "undergrowth") with an axe or a brush hook. The best of the large trees and heavy wood was cut next—often pine and spruce—which were rolled aside until winter for hauling to the mill and cutting for building materials for the house and barn (According to the c.1881 Ambrose Church Map, Waterloo had no less than three saw mills). Michael Wile mentioned the size of "rock maple" being two and three feet thick and the oak and ash being of "immense size" (Desbrisay, 1895). Some of this wood was used for firewood and the straighter wood for fence posts. The rest of the larger unwanted wood was left to dry for later burning.

When these trees were cut, the choppers "were usually very careful to leave the stumps about two feet high but no higher" (Martin 1974). This allowed two wheeled carts to pass over them but still left them high enough to catch hold of when being pulled out by oxen. Usually the stumps were left for two or three years until partially rotted when they were more easily pulled from the soil.

Lucy, Michael's wife, illustrated this process when she said how she used to "take her little children in a big basket to the field where [she] was reaping or doing other work, and spread a quilt in between the stumps and put them on it, and place another quilt above them for shade" (Desbrisay, 1895).

Once the land was cleared, it was burnt in May and planted immediately. Planting the potatoes, cucumbers, corn and pumpkins was hard work since the soil often had many rocks and roots requiring the most effective tool: a sharp stick. Turnip and grain seed was sown by hand and covered with soil scratched up by the "burnt-land harrow" made from the crotch of a tree with protruding spikes. This ox drawn harrow was triangular with spikes slanted toward the back so as not to get stuck between the stumps and rocks. For a year or two after the burn, the Wiles and Hirtles would have enjoyed the rich ash-filled, weed-free soil. Michael Wile refers to this kind of land when he said he wore his new moose skin trousers "in the burnt land" (Desbrisay, 1895). After two or three years, the crops were rotated to another piece of burnt land leaving the depeated soil either for rough pasture or the seeding down to hay (Martin, 1974).

== Natural resources and economy ==
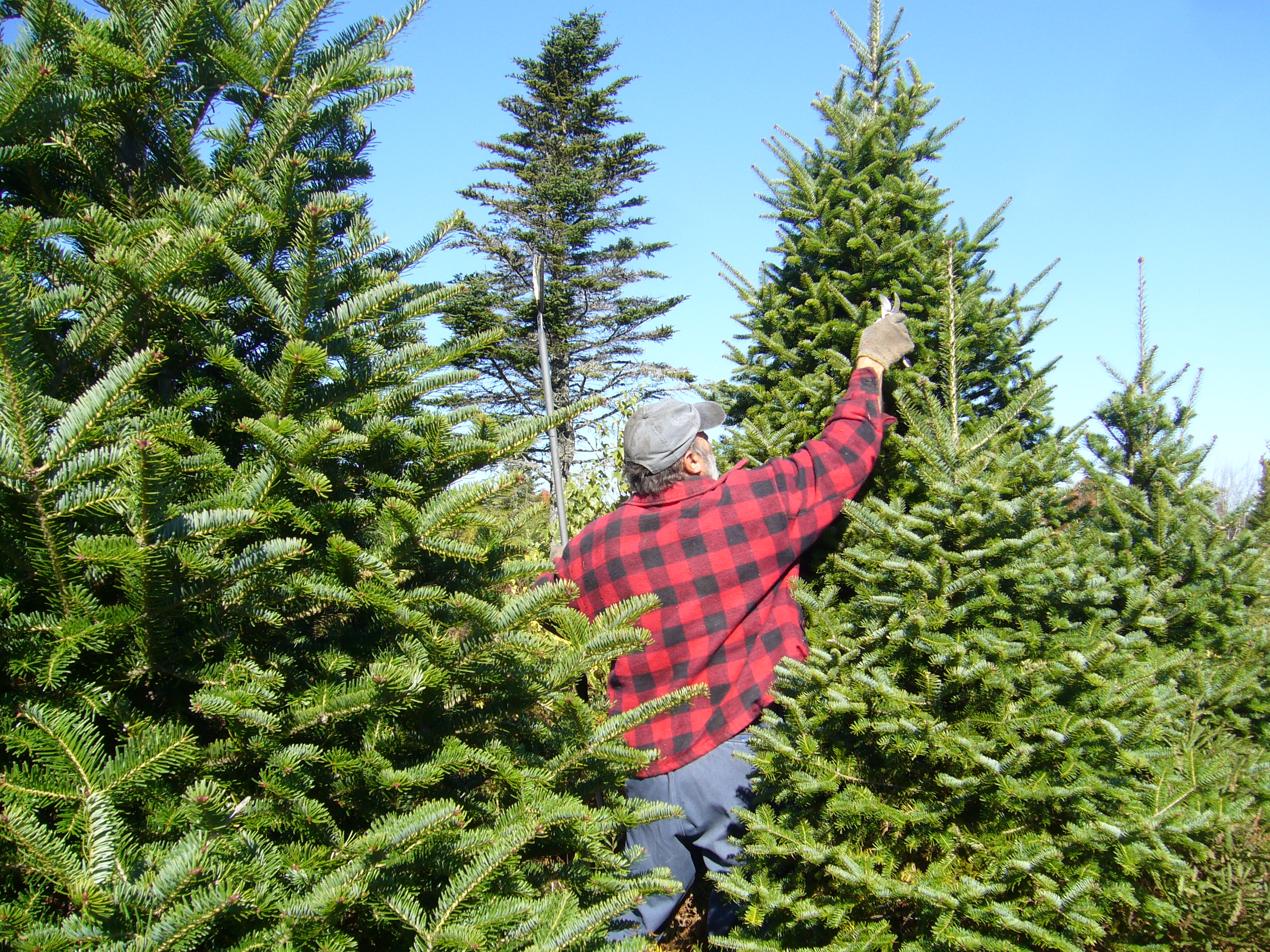
A Waterloo hobbyist in Waterloo prunes balsam fir trees in October. Christmas trees must have "three frosts" to stabilize the needles before commercial growers cut, haul, bale, and ship as far away as New England or Puerto Rico.

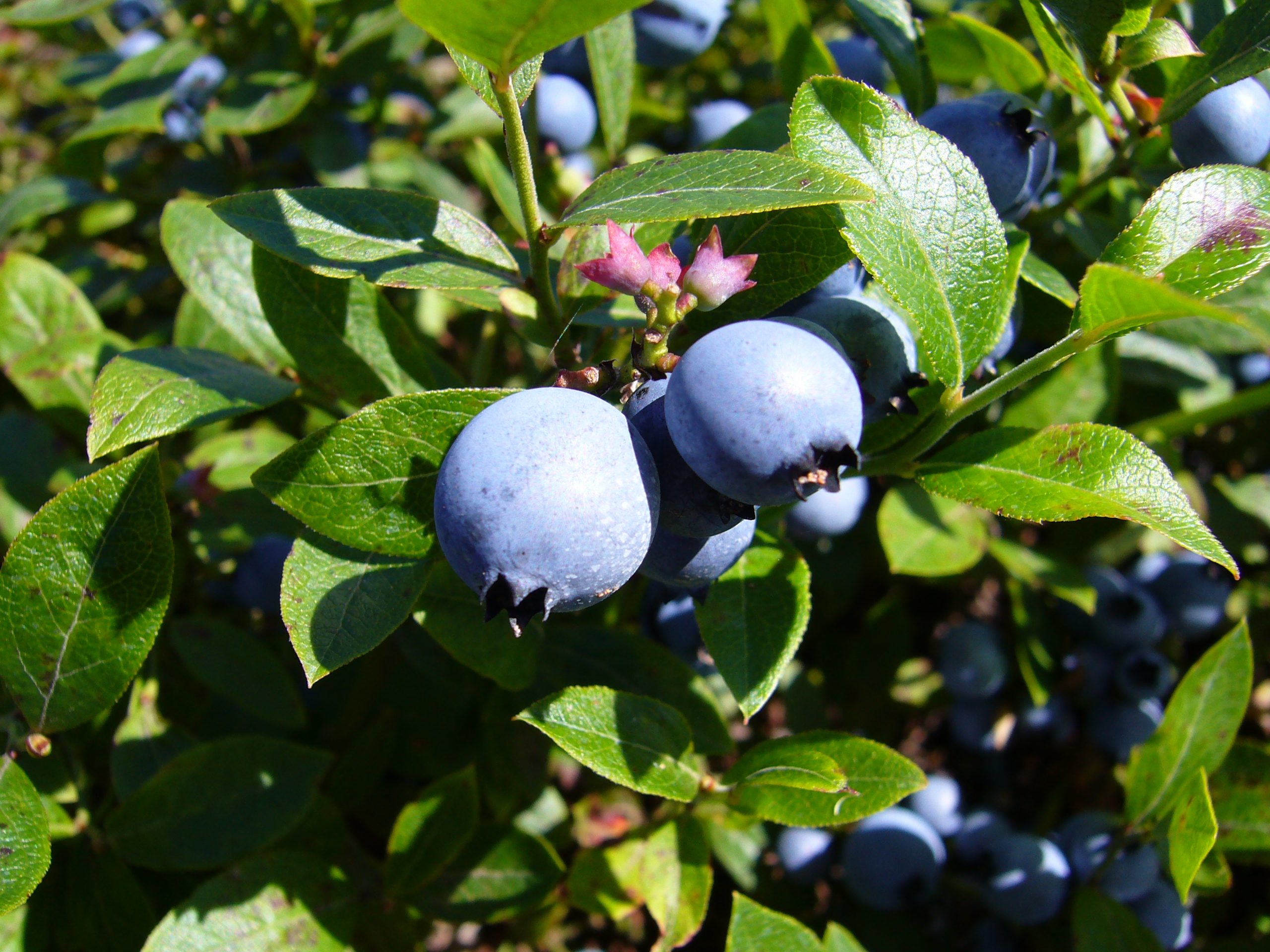
Wild blueberries are not "cultivated" but grow naturally on drumlins. These berries require the proper growing conditions to be successful. This usually involved removing any canopy that interferes with direct sunlight exposure.

In an 1894 interview, Michael Wile refers to his wheat, a crop not planted in recent times. Michael and the other first farmers were first preoccupied with producing bread with their own flour since the cost of imported wheat was prohibitive. Michael Wile said that the first flour he used in the settlement was from his own wheat (According to the c.1881 Ambrose Church Map, Waterloo had two gristmills). The growing of wheat in the county was a difficult undertaking since the climate often didn't permit proper ripening and the quality of the crop sometimes yielded low quality flour. In 1845, a large setback to wheat-growing occurred with the scourge of wheat midge Thecodiplomis mosellana Gehin. The larvae from this microorganism destroyed the grain kernels as their developed (Martin, 1974).

Michael also refers to tapping maples "easily get[ting] three barrels of sap out of one large maple ... ma[king] two hundred pounds of maple sugar in a season." This tradition has been continued by Michael Wile's ancestors.

Wildlife was especially plentiful in the early days of the settlement—especially moose. Michael Wile identified the land as "great moose country" where the community hunters killed upwards to 10 in a season—some of which weighed 800 pounds (Desbrisay, 1895).

Since the mid-20th century wild blueberries have been cultivated on the Isaac Wile Hill and balsam fir Christmas trees have been grown in various parts of the community. After the first three autumn frosts which set the needles, the trees are traditionally cut in November. Research is currently being done in Truro, Nova Scotia to develop a tree which will not drop its needles after being cut. This is key to an industry which exports 80 percent of its product to the USA—a market that is steadily become interested in artificial trees that don't drop needles.

Much pulpwood and timber has been harvested from the community especially since the Mersey Pulp Mill was built in 1929 in Liverpool, Nova Scotia (Bowater, 2007). Red spruce, black spruce and balsam fir are the most common species harvested after it matures in approximately 30 to 40 years. In most cases, the shallow layers of topsoil and grey clay layers beneath the forest do not support a tree's long term growth or promote good drainage in the local area. The community is rich in shale which when blasted and crushed provides various grades of road and building materials.

== Recreation: continuity and change ==
The community hall was and remains the center of collective recreation. Some of the events have changed and some continue in forms that reflect the current times in Lunenburg County.

One popular event from early times until the 1990s was the annual Strawberry Supper, celebrating the county's berry harvest. This event brought the community together to socialize and raise funds for the upkeep of the hall. In the 1940s, tables were set up outside the schoolhouse in the yard. The women worked in the kitchen passing the food out the window to those waiting on tables. The men stood around socializing about the various work projects they were involved in. Some of these event coordinators were Mrs. Lionel Wile, Mrs. Carl Wile, Mrs. Austin Bolivar, Mrs. Veinot, Mrs. Maurice Wile, and Mrs. Ivan Wile. In more recent times, all the serving and dining happened in the hall with visitors often lined up outside waiting for a seat; the serving and organizing was done by relatives of those individuals mentioned above.
