= South Shore Regional Airport =

Aerodrome in Nova Scotia, Canada

Liverpool/South Shore Regional Airport South Shore Regional Airport
- IATA: none; ICAO: CYAU

Summary
- Airport type: Public
- Operator: South Shore Flying Club
- Serves: Liverpool, Nova Scotia
- Location: Greenfield, Queens County, Nova Scotia
- Time zone: AST (UTC−04:00)
  - Summer (DST): ADT (UTC−03:00)
- Elevation AMSL: 325 ft / 99 m
- Coordinates: 44°13′50″N 064°51′22″W

Map
- Location in Nova Scotia CYAU (Canada)

Runways
Direction	Length		Surface
Direction	ft	m	Surface
07/25	3,933	1,199	Asphalt

Statistics (2007)
- Aircraft movements: 311
- Sources: CFS, Queens Tourism; Movements from Statistics Canada.

Liverpool/South Shore Regional Airport or South Shore Regional Airport (ICAO: CYAU) is a registered aerodrome located in Greenfield, 13 nautical miles (24 km; 15 mi) north northwest of Liverpool, in the Region of Queens Municipality in Nova Scotia, Canada.

== History ==
Established with the participation of the Town of Liverpool, the Municipality of the County of Queens, and the South Queens Chamber of Commerce, the aerodrome opened with a 3,000-foot (910 m) gravel landing strip in 1970. The runway was paved in 1975, at which time a paved apron was also constructed.

The aerodrome was further improved in 1983-84. In the 1990s, the runway was extended, the apron was expanded, and the pavement load capacity was improved such that the airport can now accommodate light jet aircraft or aircraft up to the size of the Lockheed C-130 Hercules.

In the 2000s the avgas aviation fuel delivery system was decommissioned. This led to a decline in traffic. The avgas facility has since been restored.

On 12 January 2016, the Region of Queens council voted down a motion to close the airport. In 2016, a new 15-year lease agreement was reached between the municipality and the flying club. The club's goals were to maintain the airport infrastructure, build a hangar, and attract new business. Since then, the club has leased land for future hangar construction, and renovated the terminal building. In 2019, Region of Queens council gave approval for the flying club to sub-lease land to outside groups for the construction of new hangars.

In 2022, the municipality moved twice to sell the airport, creating some controversy. Airport advocates pointed out that the loss of the airport could be a safety risk, as it is the only paved runway on the South Shore between Yarmouth and Halifax. In December 2022, the municipality voted down a motion to sell. In early 2023, 20-year leases were signed with both the flying club and a drag racing association.

== Operations ==
South Shore Regional Airport has one paved runway, which is 3,933 feet (1,199 m) long and 75 feet (23 m) wide. It is located at 80 Airport Road, Greenfield. Airport Road is located along Nova Scotia Route 210.

The airport is owned by the Region of Queens Municipality, and operated by the South Shore Flying Club, formed in 2015. The municipality provides $2,500 per year to help maintain the runway. The airport is unmanned, and has no fuel or snow plowing capability.

== Incidents and accidents ==
- On 15 December 1998, a Cessna 172M crashed near the airport after aborting a planned touch-and-go landing. The two occupants were killed. The Transportation Safety Board of Canada determined that the likely cause of the accident was pilot disorientation and loss of situational awareness.

== See also ==
- List of airports in Nova Scotia
