= Nova Scotia Route 210 =

Highway in Nova Scotia, Canada

Route 210

Route information
- Maintained by Nova Scotia Department of Transportation and Infrastructure Renewal
- Length: 32 km (20 mi)

Major junctions
- West end: Trunk 8 in Greenfield (Middlefield)
- East end: Route 325 in Newcombville

Location
- Country: Canada
- Province: Nova Scotia
- Counties: Lunenburg

Highway system
- Provincial highways in Nova Scotia; 100-series
← Route 209	→ Route 211

Route 210 is an east-west collector road in the southwest of the Canadian province of Nova Scotia, to the north of Liverpool and west of Bridgewater. It goes across a forested region and about 20 kilometres of it follows the Atlantic Ocean. It is 32 kilometres long and is paved for its entire length.

It is located in Lunenburg County and the Region of Queens Municipality, connecting Middlefield on Trunk 8 to Newcombville on Route 325

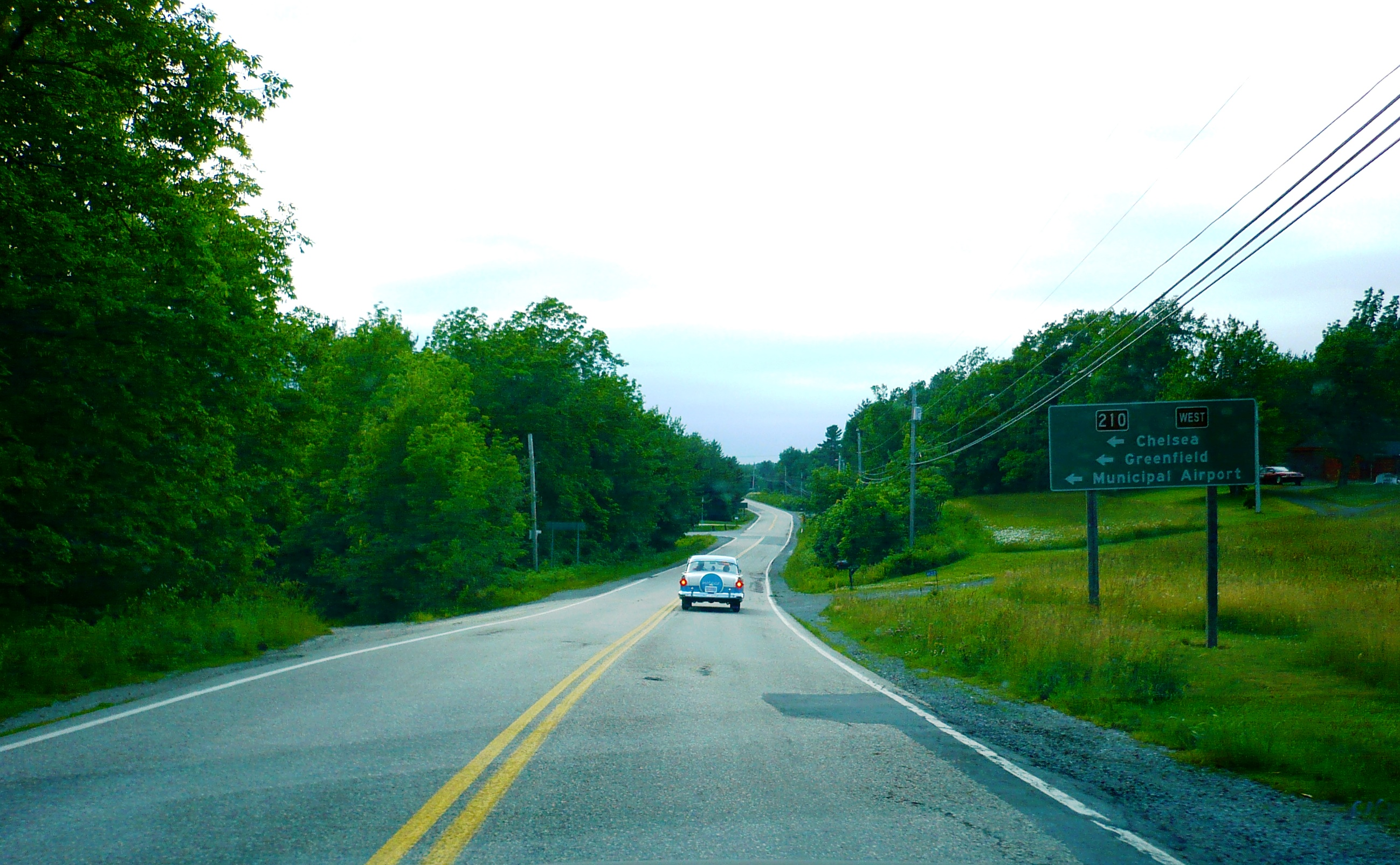
Highway 325 intersecting the beginning of Highway 210 in Newcombville.

== History ==
In March 2004 Route 210 received $906,000 to repave the stretch between Molega Lake Road and Buckfield Road. Dexter Construction was awarded the contract and work was scheduled to be completed in August 2004. More work was done in January 2008 when a $1,489,180 was awarded to Dexter Construction Ltd. to repave Trunk 8 from Chapel Hill to the intersection with Route 210, it was scheduled for completion that summer.

== Route ==
Route 210 beings at Middlefield where Trunk 8 connects Liverpool and Annapolis Royal together. Route 210 starts by connecting to South Shore Regional Airport, it continues by going northeast for twenty kilometres, passing through Greenfield and Chelsea. In the latter city it turns east to connect Newcombville, where it terminates on Route 325.

== Communities ==
- Greenfield (Middlefield - Greenfield - Wellington)
- Chelsea (Upper Chelsea - Chelsea)
- Newcombville

== See also ==
- List of Nova Scotia provincial highways

== Sources ==
- MapArt (2008). Canada back road atlas / atlas des rangs et chemins. Oshawa, Ontario: MapArt Publishing. ISBN 978-1-55368-614-9.
