= Buckfield =

Buckfield may refer to:

- Buckfield, Maine, town in Oxford County, Maine, United States
- Buckfield, Nova Scotia, community in the Canadian province of Nova Scotia

== People ==
- Adam de Buckfield (ca. 1220–d. before 1294), English Franciscan philosopher
- Clare Buckfield (born 1976), English actress
- Julie Buckfield (born 1976), English actress
- Lin Buckfield, Australian television producer, journalist and musician
- Nick Buckfield (born 1973), English pole vaulter
