= Bockenfeld =

Bockenfeld is a surname. Notable people with the surname include:

- Manfred Bockenfeld (born 1960), German footballer
- Rod Bockenfeld (1955–2025), American politician in Colorado

== See also ==
- Adam of Bockenfield (c. 1220 – before 1294), English Franciscan philosopher
