= Willis Lake (Queens) =

Lake in Region of Queens Municipality, Nova Scotia, Canada

Willis Lake Queens
- Location within Nova Scotia
- Location: Region of Queens Municipality, Nova Scotia
- Coordinates: 43°53′47″N 64°49′10.9″W
- Basin countries: Canada

Willis Lake Queens is a lake of the Region of Queens Municipality, in Nova Scotia, Canada.

== See also ==
- List of lakes in Nova Scotia
