= West Rounton =

Village and civil parish in North Yorkshire, England

Coordinates: 54.4248°N 1.36412°W

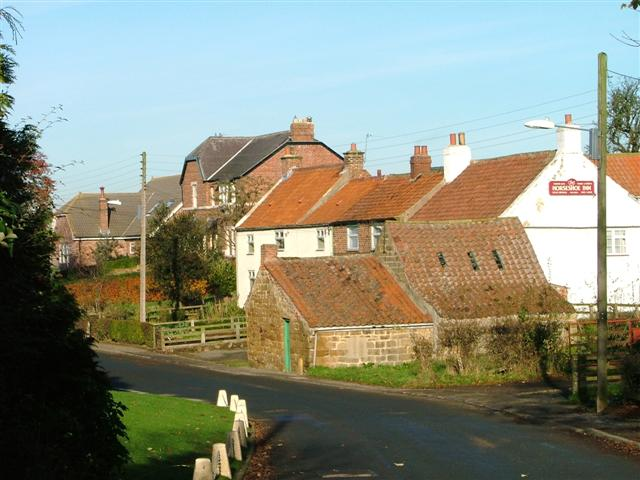
- West Rounton village

- Location within North Yorkshire
- Population: 306 (Including East Rounton. 2011 census)
- OS grid reference: NZ413034
- Unitary authority: North Yorkshire
- Ceremonial county: North Yorkshire
- Region: Yorkshire and the Humber
- Country: England
- Sovereign state: United Kingdom
- Post town: NORTHALLERTON
- Postcode district: DL6
- Police: North Yorkshire
- Fire: North Yorkshire
- Ambulance: Yorkshire

West Rounton is a village and civil parish in North Yorkshire, England. It is 8 miles (13 km) north of Northallerton. East Rounton is about 1-mile (1.6 km) away across the fields.

From 1974 to 2023 it was part of the Hambleton District, it is now administered by the unitary North Yorkshire Council.

== History ==
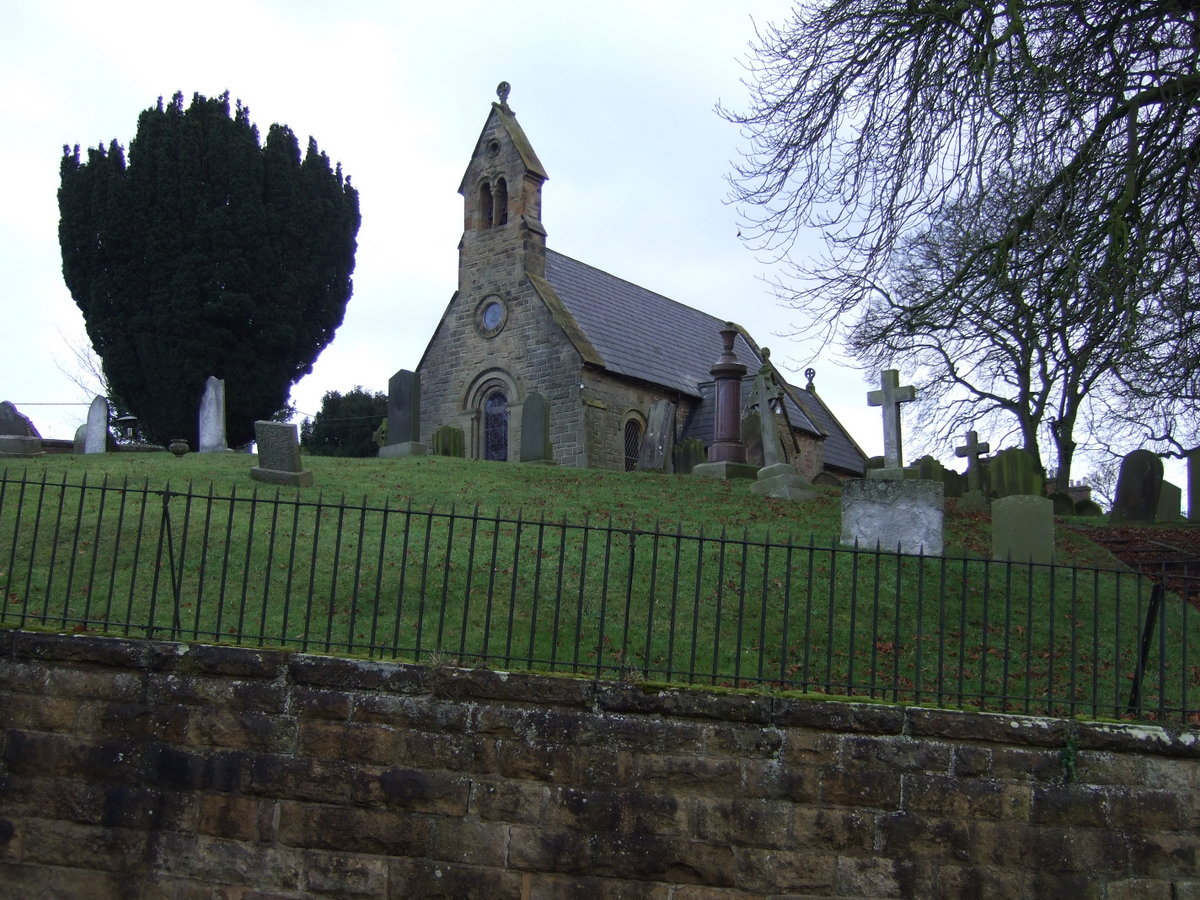
St Oswald's Church

The village is mentioned in the Domesday Book as Rontun or Runtune, and as having 75 ploughlands and 100 acres (40 ha) of meadows. The name Rounton derives from the Old English hrung, and tūn (rung-town). The first part refers to a type of bridge made with poles, often built over marshy ground. Historically, the village was in the wapentake of Allertonshire, today being in the Hambleton District.

The nearest railway station was just outside the village (West Rounton Gates), which opened in June 1852, and closed in September 1939. The modern civil parish consists largely of agricultural land covering over 1,500 acres (610 ha), with the River Wiske flowing westwards across the parish.

St Oswald's Church, West Rounton, dates from the 12th century and was completely rebuilt in 1860 by architect James Pritchett. It is a grade II* listed building. Historically the church was dedicated to St James, a listing from 1835 shows it as St James in the parish of Rouncton [sic], West.

West Rounton had one pub, the Horse Shoe Inn, but this closed down after trade suffered during the COVID-19 pandemic lockdowns. The building is grade II listed. It is also home to Whitegates Nursery & Stamfrey Farm Organics which is known for its clotted cream products.

== Notable people ==
- Adam of Bockenfield, was a priest in charge of the church in the village in 1243
- Henry Jessey, nonconformist minister, was born in the village

== See also ==
- Listed buildings in West Rounton
