= Horse Shoe Inn =

Historic former pub in West Rounton, North Yorkshire, England

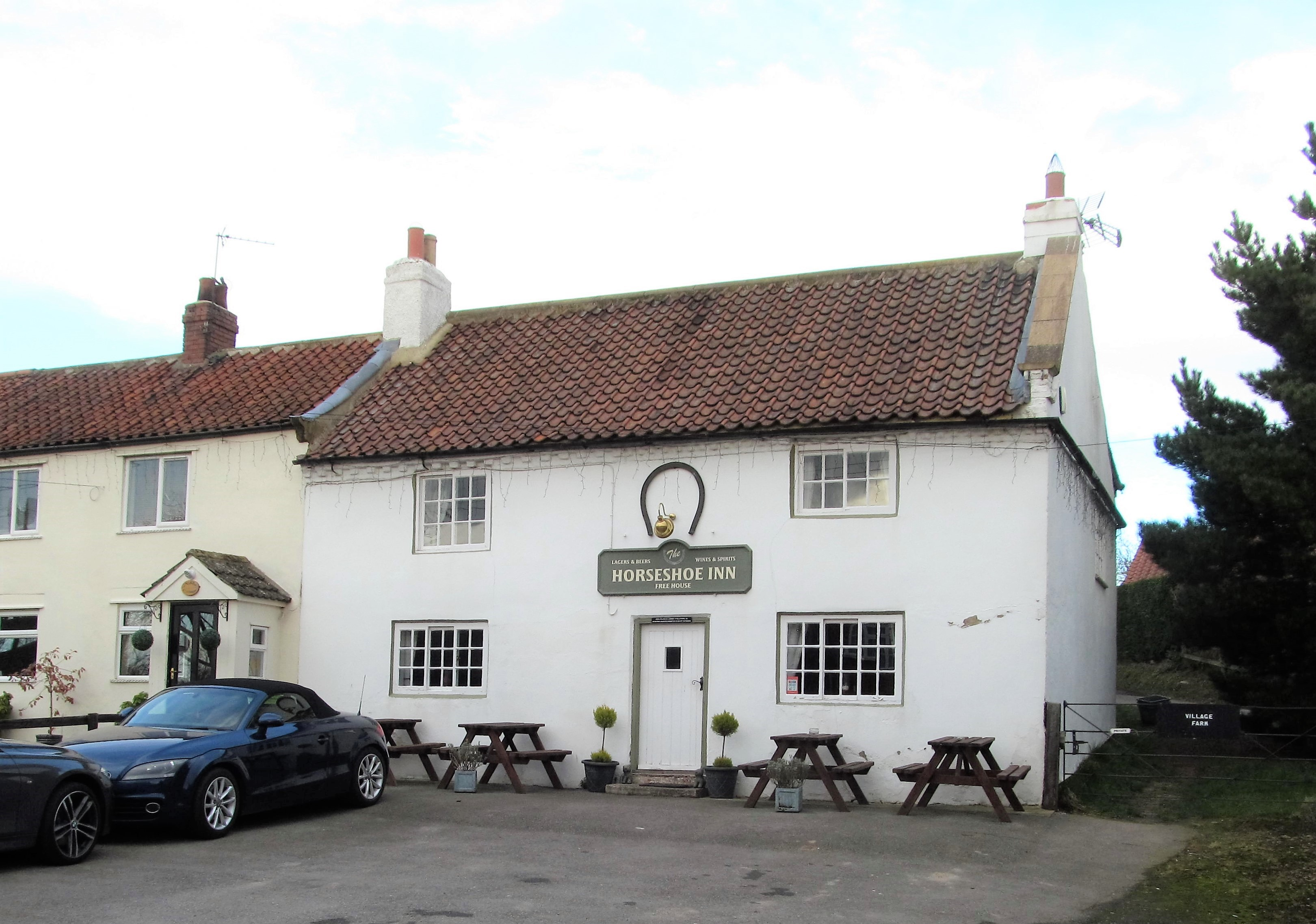
- The pub in 2019

- Location within North Yorkshire
- Alternative names: Horseshoe Inn

General information
- Type: Public house (former)
- Location: West Rounton, North Yorkshire, England
- Coordinates: 54.2331°N 1.5904°W
- Year built: Late 18th century
- Renovated: 1860s (converted); 20th century (altered)
- Closed: 2022

Website
- horse-shoe-inn.co.uk

Listed Building – Grade II
- Official name: The Horse Shoe Inn
- Designated: 31 March 1970
- Reference no.: 1150880

The Horse Shoe Inn is a historic former pub in West Rounton, a village in North Yorkshire, England.

The building was constructed in the late 18th century, and it was converted into a pub in the 1860s. The front door was altered in the 20th century. The building was Grade II listed in 1970. The pub was owned by the Hoare family for almost 100 years until it closed in 2005. It reopened in 2010, but closed once more in 2022. In 2023, it was listed as an asset of community value, and permission to convert it into a private house was refused.

The pub is built of rendered brick, with dentilled eaves, and a pantile roof with rendered coping on the right. It has two storeys and is two bays wide. On the front is a doorway, and the windows are horizontally sliding sashes. Inside, a large wrought iron horseshoe is fastened above the bar.

== See also ==
- Listed buildings in West Rounton
