= St Oswald's Church, West Rounton =

Church in West Rounton, North Yorkshire, England

Coordinates: 54.4244°N 1.3636°W

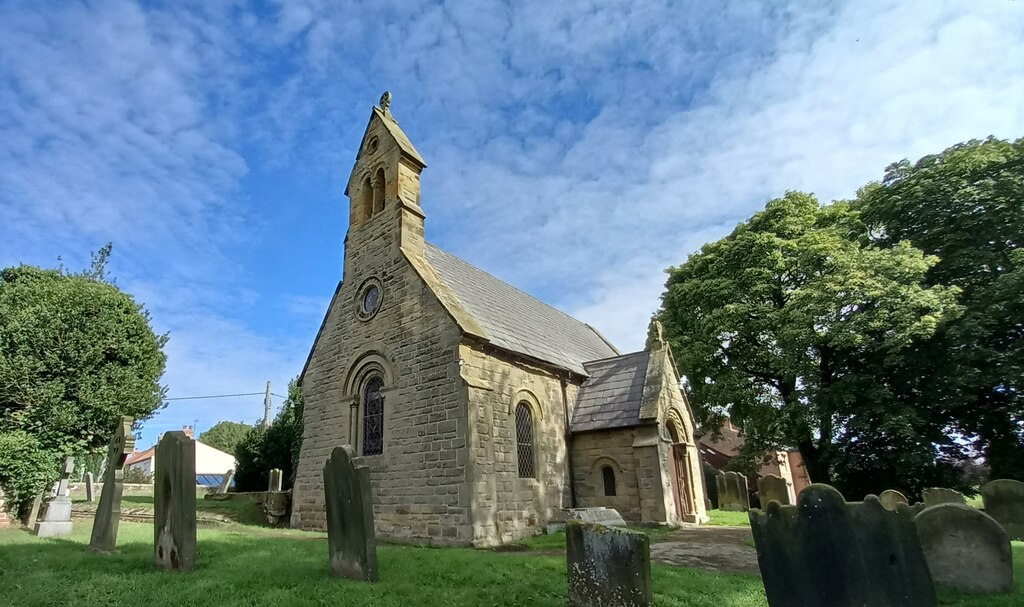
The church, in 2021

St Oswald's Church is the parish church of West Rounton, a village in North Yorkshire, in England.

The church was built in about 1150, but was much altered over the years, and little survives other than the chancel arch and part of the south doorway. The remainder of the church was rebuilt in 1860 by James Pigott Pritchett. The building was grade II* listed in 1987.

The church is built in stone with a Welsh slate roof, and consists of a nave with a south porch, and a chancel with a north vestry. On the west gable is a gabled bellcote with double-arched openings. The south doorway is Norman, with one order of columns, the capitals with plait and volutes, and a zigzag moulded arch. Inside, there is a 12th-century font, the bowl having carvings of a face with a beard, and a centaur firing an arrow.

== See also ==
- Grade II* listed churches in North Yorkshire (district)
- Listed buildings in West Rounton
