= Listed buildings in West Rounton =

West Rounton is a civil parish in the county of North Yorkshire, England. It contains three listed buildings that are recorded in the National Heritage List for England. Of these, one is listed at Grade II*, the middle of the three grades, and the others are at Grade II, the lowest grade. The parish contains the village of West Rounton and the surrounding area, and the listed buildings consist of a church, a public house and a bridge.

== Key ==
| Grade | Criteria |
|---|---|
| II* | Particularly important buildings of more than special interest |
| II | Buildings of national importance and special interest |

== Buildings ==
| Name and location | Photograph | Date | Notes | Grade |
|---|---|---|---|---|
| St Oswald's Church; 54.42443°N 1.36368°W | | 12th century | The church was almost completely rebuilt in 1887. It is built in stone with a Welsh slate roof, and consists of a nave with a south porch, and a chancel with a north vestry. On the west gable is a gabled bellcote with double-arched openings. The south doorway is Norman, with one order of columns, the capitals with plait and volutes, and a zigzag moulded arch. | II* |
| The Horse Shoe Inn; 54.42620°N 1.36375°W | | Late 18th century | The public house is in rendered brick, with dentilled eaves, and a pantile roof with rendered coping on the right. There are two storeys and two bays. On the front is a doorway, and the windows are horizontally sliding sashes. | II |
| West Rounton Bridge; 54.42394°N 1.36372°W | | Late 18th century | The bridge carries a road over the River Wiske. It is in stone, and consists of a single segmental arch with voussoirs. The bridge has a raised keystone, a plain band, and parapets with chamfered copings, rising to a point over the arch. | II |
