= Buckfield, Nova Scotia =

Community in Nova Scotia, Canada

Coordinates: 44°18′39.87″N 64°47′23.32″W

Buckfield in Nova Scotia

Buckfield is a community in the Canadian province of Nova Scotia, located in the Region of Queens Municipality.
