= Chelsea, Nova Scotia =

Community in Nova Scotia, Canada

Coordinates: 44°21′51.26″N 64°45′16.01″W

Chelsea in Nova Scotia

Chelsea is a community in the Canadian province of Nova Scotia, located in the Lunenburg Municipal District in Lunenburg County, Nova Scotia. It was probably named for Chelsea, London.
