= Queens County, Nova Scotia =

- County
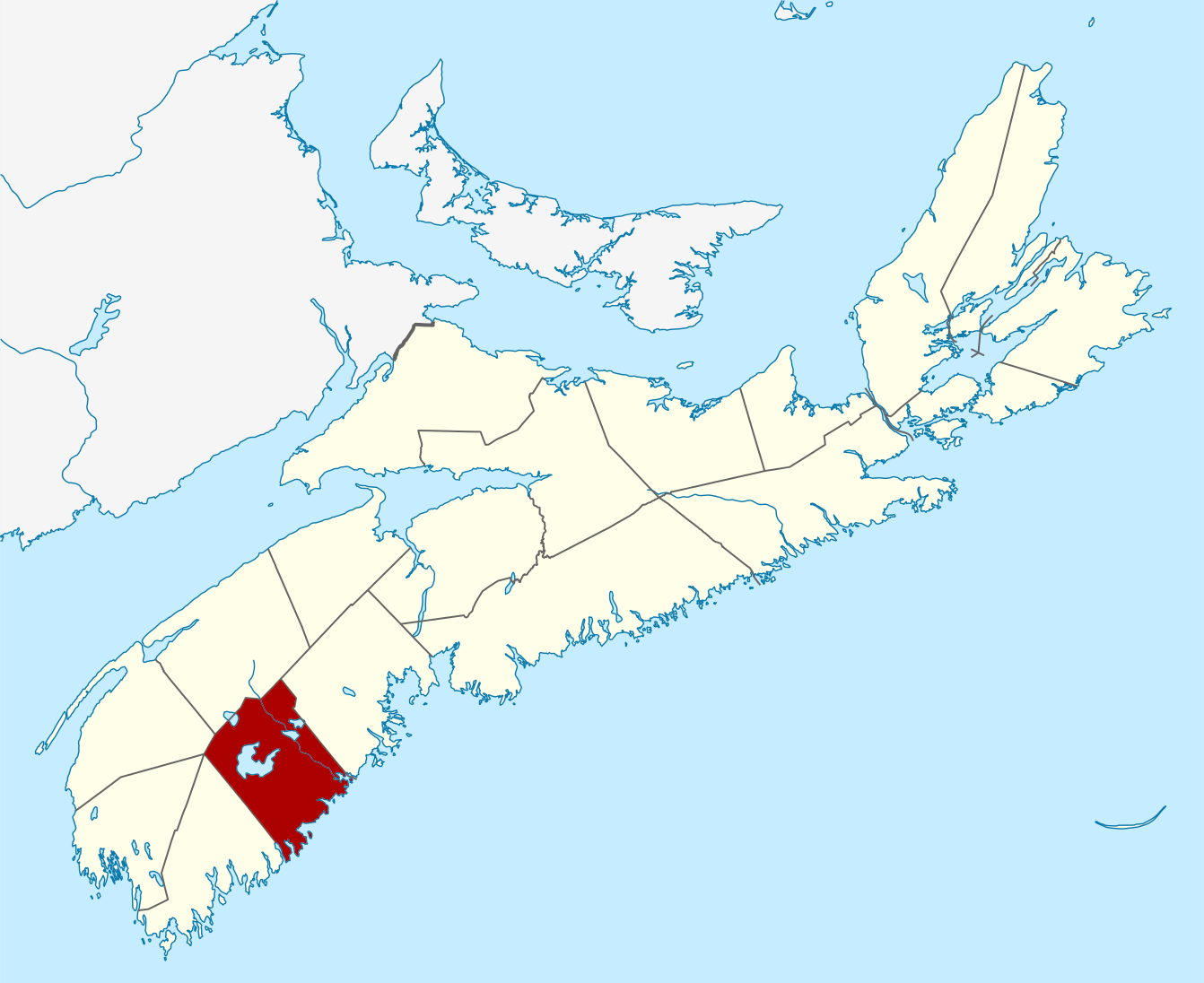
- Coordinates: 44.2°N 65.0°W
- Country: Canada
- Province: Nova Scotia
- Municipality: Region of Queens Municipality
- Established: July 21, 1762
- Incorporated: April 17, 1879
- Amalgamated: April 1, 1996
- Electoral Districts Federal: South Shore—St. Margarets
- Provincial: Queens-Shelburne

Area
  - Total: 2,398.63 km^{2} (926.12 sq mi)

Population (2011)
  - Total: 10,960
  - Density: 4.6/km^{2} (12/sq mi)
- Time zone: UTC-4 (AST)
- Area code: 902
- Median Earnings*: $39,972
- Website: regionofqueens.com
- Median household income, 2000 ($) (all households); Part of a series about Places in Nova Scotia

Queens County is a county in the Canadian province of Nova Scotia.

== History ==
Liverpool, the county seat of Queens County, was founded in 1759 by the New England Planters. Founded for the most part by New England settlers, Liverpool maintained strong ties with the American colonies until the sudden outbreak of the American Revolution.

On July 21, 1762 the Lieutenant Governor and Council of Nova Scotia declared that "the Townships of Liverpool, Barrington and Yarmouth together with the intermediate lands should be erected into a county by the name of Queens County". Parts of the new county were taken from Lunenburg County, which now lies to the northeast.

In 1784, Shelburne County was formed in part from southwestern portions of Queens County. The new county boundaries were established by an Order-in-Council dated December 16, 1785.

Queens County contains substantial portions of Kejimkujik National Park, including the main body of the park inland north of Caledonia and the Seaside Adjunct near Port Joli and Port Mouton.

In 1996, the county's municipal government merged with the town of Liverpool to form the Region of Queens Municipality, thus the county is contiguous with the boundaries of the regional municipality, minus First Nations reserves.

== Demographics ==
As a census division in the 2021 Census of Population conducted by Statistics Canada, Queens County had a population of 10,501 living in 5,005 of its 6,705 total private dwellings, a change of 1.4% from its 2016 population of 10,351. With a land area of 2,393.44 km^{2} (924.11 sq mi), it had a population density of 4.4/km^{2} (11.4/sq mi) in 2021.

Population trend
Census	Population	Change (%)
2016	10,351	▼5.6%
2011	10,960	▼2.2%
2006	11,212	▼4.4%
2001	11,723	▼5.6%
1996	12,417	▼4.1%
1991	12,923	▼1.6%
1986	13,125	▼0.0%
1981	13,126	N/A
1941	12,028	
1931	10,612	
1921	9,944	
1911	10,106	
1901	10,226	
1891	10,610	
1881	10,577	
1871	10,554	N/A

Mother tongue language (2011)
Language	Population	Pct (%)
English only	10,570	97.69%
French only	80	0.74%
Non-official languages	150	1.39%
Multiple responses	20	0.18%

Ethnic Groups (2006)

Ethnic Origin	Population	Pct (%)
Canadian	5,255	47.6%
German	3,110	28.1%
English	3,010	27.2%
Scottish	2,225	20.1%
Irish	1,740	15.7%
French	1,205	10.9%
Dutch (Netherlands)	915	8.3%
North American Indian	870	7.9%

== Communities ==
Regional municipalities

- Region of Queens Municipality

Towns

- Liverpool

Villages

- Caledonia
- Greenfield

Reserves

- Ponhook Lake 10
- Wildcat 12

== See also ==
- Queens County Museum
- Royal eponyms in Canada
