= Middlefield, Nova Scotia =

Community in Nova Scotia, Canada

Coordinates: 44°12′32.97″N 64°51′56.46″W

Middlefield in Nova Scotia

Middlefield is a community in the Canadian province of Nova Scotia, located in the Region of Queens Municipality.

== Parks ==
- Ten Mile Lake Provincial Park
