= Newcombville, Nova Scotia =

Community in Nova Scotia, Canada

Coordinates: 44°22′44.26″N 64°37′17.08″W

Newcombville in Nova Scotia

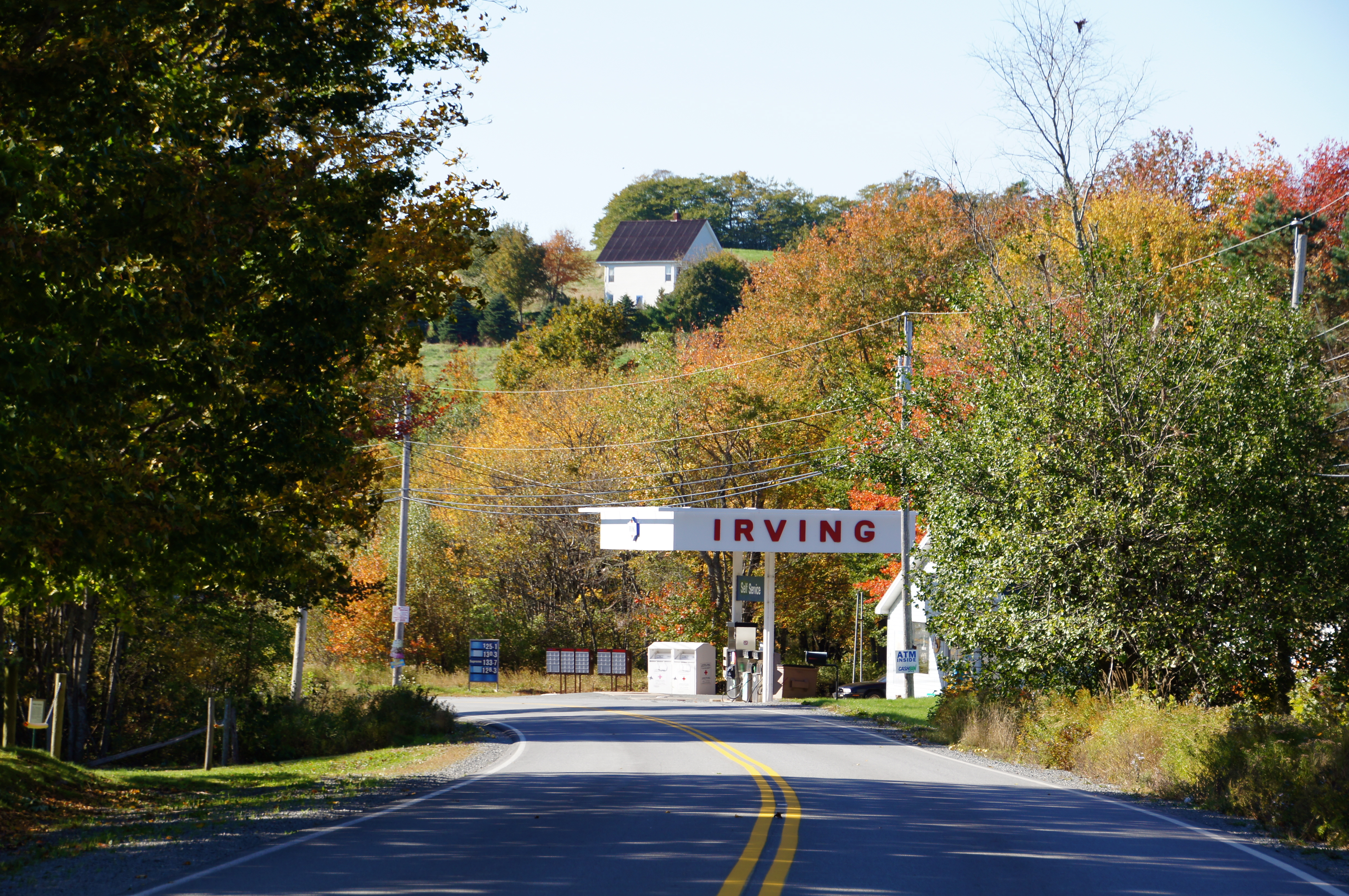
A familiar scene in Newcombville, the service station-convenience store, once called "Getsons".

Newcombville is a community in the Canadian province of Nova Scotia, located in the Lunenburg Municipal District in Lunenburg County. The community is situated west of Bridgewater.
