= Adam of Bockenfield =

English Franciscan philosopher

Adam of Bockenfield (c. 1220 – before 1294) was an English Franciscan philosopher, who taught at the University of Oxford in the early 1240s. He was an early commentator on a number of Aristotle's works, in particular those dealing with natural philosophy.

== Teacher of Aristotle ==
Adam and the theologian Richard Fishacre were two Oxford masters of the mid-13th century. Adam introduced the New Aristotle at the English university at a time when it was prohibited from being taught in Paris, France because of ecclesiastical restrictions. It is probable that Adam received a degree in theology and penned his Aristotelian commentaries during his regency in arts which began by 1243. His explanation of Aristotle's meaning drew heavily on the writing of Averroes.

== Nature of the soul ==
His particular interest was in whether the agent intellect was within the soul or a power of the soul. Averroes' believed in the latter interpretation while many theologians were inclined to affirm the former. Adam doubted that the agent and possible intellect are of the same substance. He wondered if the substance of the possible intellect is within the soul while that of the agent intellect is outside of it. Like his Oxford colleagues he was curious about the unity of the soul. He felt that Aristotle merely refuted the idea of Plato. The latter believed the various functions of the soul (understanding, opinion, desire, etc.) reflected diverse parts of the soul, which were located in different organs. To answer the question left unanswered by Aristotle, Adam commented that each of the properties reside in the soul as a whole.

He elaborated by saying that each individual being can have only one perfection. So it follows that man's perfection must be in one substance. He thought that according to Aristotelian principles, the vegetative and sensitive souls were of different substance than the 'intellective' soul. His attempt to clarify this was inspired by Philip the Chancellor. However Adam's is a more believable argument concerning this matter than is Philip's Summa. Philip the Chancellor insisted that the body and soul were united by a particular medium.
