= Region of Queens Municipality =

Queens
- Regional municipality
- Region of Queens Municipality
- Coat of arms
- Motto: Rivers, Forest, Sea
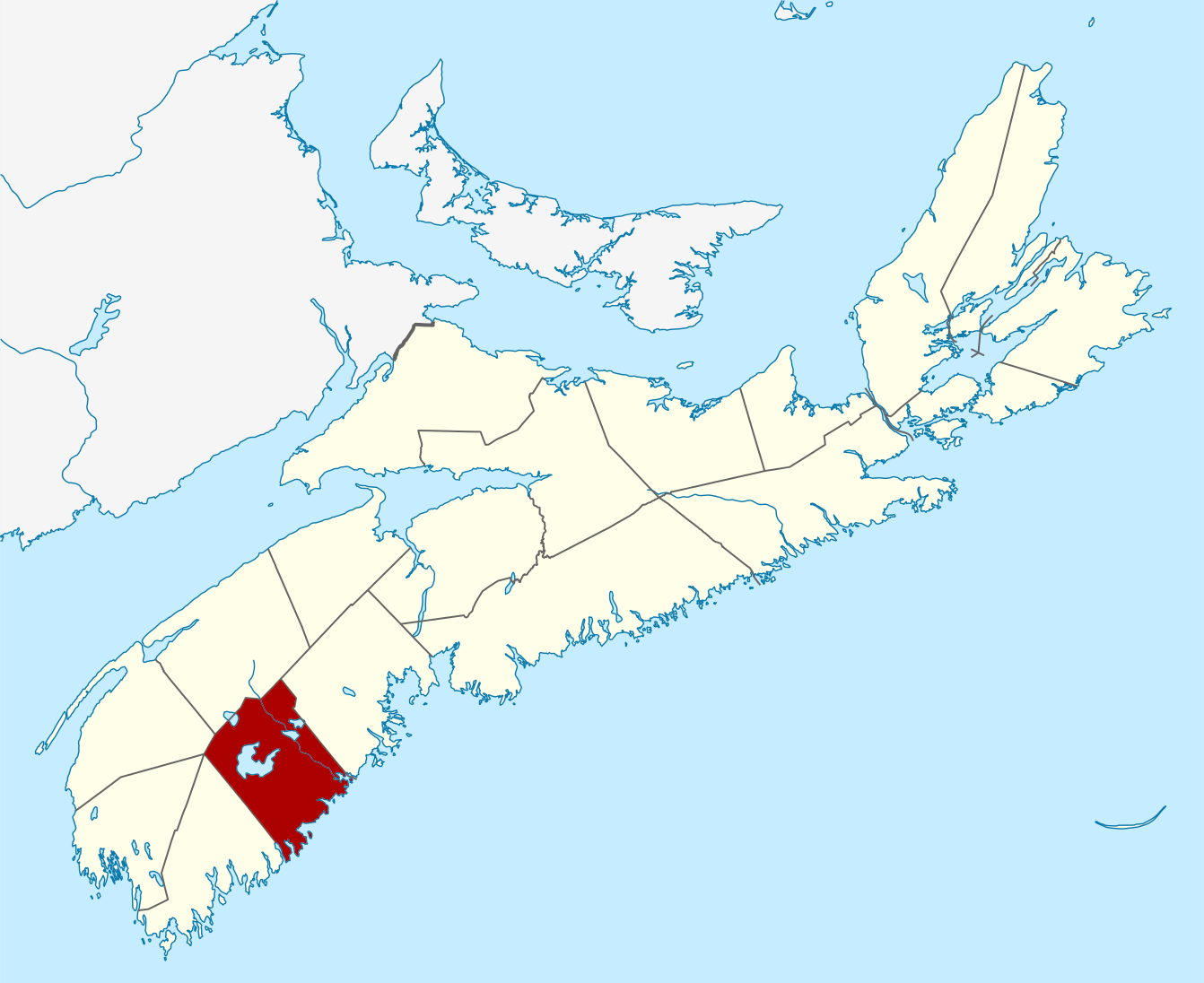
- Location of Region of Queens Municipality, Nova Scotia
- Coordinates: 44°02′N 64°43′W
- Country: Canada
- Province: Nova Scotia
- Incorporated: April 1, 1996
- Electoral Districts Federal: South Shore—St. Margaret's
- Provincial: Queens

Government
  - Type: Queens Regional Council
  - Mayor: Scott Christian

Area (2021)
  - Land: 2,387.52 km^{2} (921.83 sq mi)

Population (2021)
  - Total: 10,422
  - Density: 4.4/km^{2} (11/sq mi)
  - Change 2016-2021: ▲1.2%
  - Census ranking (2016): 400 of 5,162
- Time zone: UTC-4 (AST)
  - Summer (DST): UTC-3 (ADT)
- Area codes: 902, 782
- Dwellings: 6,676
- Median Income*: $56,800 CDN
- Website: regionofqueens.com
- Median household income, 2020 (all households)

The Region of Queens Municipality is a regional municipality in southwestern Nova Scotia, Canada. It is the northern gateway of the UNESCO Southwest Nova Biosphere Reserve, a centre of outdoor activities. Campgrounds at Kejimukujik National Park and National Historic Site, Thomas H. Raddall Provincial Park, and several other locations offer hiking, biking, canoeing, kayaking, cross-country skiing and snowshoeing. Its seacoast and inland areas are popular photo locations.

== Geography ==
The municipality's boundary includes all of Queens County except for First Nations reserves.

The municipality is 2,760 km^{2} (1,070 sq mi), with a diverse geography. Some of its communities are on the Atlantic Ocean's shoreline, while others are further inland; these differences can lead to localized weather patterns. Overall, the municipality's proximity to the ocean provides a temperate climate with mild winters, comfortable summers and a long autumn season.

== History ==
The Region of Queens Municipality was formed in 1996 through an amalgamation of the town of Liverpool and the Municipality of the County of Queens. Its other communities include:

- Beach Meadows
- Brooklyn
- Caledonia
- Greenfield
- Middlefield
- Mill Village
- Milton
- Northfield
- Port Joli
- Port Medway
- Port Mouton
- Summerville
- Western Head

== Demographics ==
In the 2021 Census of Population conducted by Statistics Canada, the Region of Queens Municipality had a population of 10,422 living in 4,977 of its 6,676 total private dwellings, a change of 1.2% from its 2016 population of 10,302. With a land area of 2,387.52 km^{2} (921.83 sq mi), it had a population density of 4.4/km^{2} (11.3/sq mi) in 2021.

Population trend
Census	Population	Change (%)
2021	10,422	▲1.2%
2016	10,307	▼5.6%
2011	10,917	▼2.3%
2006	11,177	▼4.2%
Adjustment	11,665	▼0.2%
2001	11,694	▼5.6%
1996	12,386	▼4.0%
1991	12,903	N/A

Mother tongue language (2011)
Language	Population	Pct (%)
English only	10,530	97.73%
French only	80	0.74%
Non-official languages	145	1.34%
Multiple responses	20	0.18%

Ethnic Groups (2006)
Ethnic Origin	Population	Pct (%)
Canadian	5,245	47.6%
German	3,110	28.2%
English	3,005	27.3%
Scottish	2,225	20.2%
Irish	1,740	15.8%
French	1,205	10.9%
Dutch (Netherlands)	910	8.3%
North American Indian	840	7.6%

== Access routes ==
Highways and numbered routes that run through the municipality, including external routes that start or finish at the municipal boundary:

- Highways
  - Hwy 103
- Trunk Routes
  - Trunk 3
  - Trunk 8
- Collector Routes:
  - Route 208
  - Route 210
  - Route 331
- External Routes:
  - None

== See also ==
- Queens County Museum
- List of municipalities in Nova Scotia
- List of counties of Nova Scotia
