= Greenfield, Queens County =

Community in Nova Scotia, Canada

Coordinates: 44°16′18.76″N 64°50′30.56″W

Greenfield in Nova Scotia

Greenfield is a community in the Canadian province of Nova Scotia, located in the Region of Queens Municipality. The sawmill in Greenfield, founded in 1832, is one of the oldest family-run sawmill businesses in North America. Until 1850 the region was occupied mostly by the Mi'kmaq of the Algonquin tribe, who seasonally settled the area below the lakes on either side of what is now called the Medway River and was known by the Mi'kmaq as Wigadoon.

== Population ==
In the last Statistics Canada census in 2011, Greenfield had a population of 961. This was a 30.2% higher than the previous census in 2001. In 2011 21.2% of the population was under the age of 20 and 16.6% was 65 years or older.

== History ==
Before the European settlers came in the early 1800s Greenfield was used exclusively as a seasonal hunting and fishing ground by the Mi'kmaq, who had settled the valley on either side of the river. The Mi'kmaq called the area Ponhook until the name was changed to Greenfield in 1850 by European settlers. In the early 1830s the Jesuits began travelling to the area to convert indigenous tribes to Christianity. They built a chapel in 1859 near the lake pool at the head of the river, but it was never completed. In 1840 the Government of Canada designated a reserve on the west side of the river chiefly for a burial ground and chapel.

Besides the Jesuits, the first European settler to come to the area was Samuel Hunt Sr (1792–1872), who persuaded the natives to let him settle there by trading large amounts of liquor from his bootlegging operation. The second settler to arrive was Gorham Freeman (1803–1881), and in 1832 the first "single" saw mill was established at the head of the falls on the river.

== Tourism and industry ==
Forestry and recreation are the main industries of the area. The Freeman Lumber mill employs approximately 160 men and women. Two local stores, a recreation centre, an RV park and a campground also employ small numbers of workers. A small airport just outside the village converted its runway into a dragway, and each weekend in summer tournaments are held there, under the auspices of the Greenfield Dragway Nova Scotia Drag Racing Association. The Region of Queens Municipality attempted to sell the airport in 2022, but the sale did not proceed and the following year a flying club and the drag racing association signed 20-year leases.

The area's population increases in summer with an influx of tourists to cottages and summer homes on the lake, as well as fishermen and deer hunters in the fall. A planked salmon supper is held by the local volunteer fire department, and another by the local recreation society, in July and September.
