= Phillips (surname) =

- Language: English; Welsh

Origin
- Meaning: son of Philip
- Region of origin: widespread

Other names
- Variant forms: Philips, Philipp, Philippson, Filip, Phelps, Phipps

Phillips is a common patronymic surname of English and Welsh origin that derives from the given name Philip. It appears in Dutch, Flemish, and north German as Philips.

== Notable people with this surname include ==
=== A ===
- A. A. Phillips (1900–1985), Australian critic
- Abi Phillips (born 1994), English actress
- Adolfo Phillips (born 1941), Panamanian baseball player
- Adrian Phillips (born 1992), American football player
- Aimee Phillips (born 1991), New Zealand footballer
- Áine Phillips (born 1965), Irish film director
- A. L. Phillips, American football coach
- Al Phillips (1920–1999), English boxer
- Alison Phillips (born 1970), British journalist
- Allan Phillips, Venezuelan composer
- Allan Robert Phillips (1914–1996), American ornithologist
- Alma Rock Phillips (1895–1930), Australian actress
- Almarin Phillips (1925–2006), American economist
- Amanda Phillips (born 1981), Australian weightlifter
- Ammi Phillips (1788–1865), American painter
- Amyas Phillips (1891–1962), English antique dealer
- Anastasia Phillips, Canadian actress
- Andre Phillips (born 1959), American track and field athlete
- Andrea Phillips (born 1974), American game designer
- Andru Phillips, American football player
- Angela Phillips, British journalist
- Anita Phillips (1945–2023), Australian politician
- Ann C. Phillips, American admiral
- Ann Terry Greene Phillips (1813–1886), American abolitionist
- Anna Lise Phillips (born 1975), Australian actress
- Anton Phillips (born 1943), Jamaican-British actor
- Anwar Phillips (born 1982), American football player
- Anya Phillips (1955–1981), American fashion designer
- Arianne Phillips (born 1963), American costume designer
- Arlene Phillips (born 1943), English choreographer
- Art Phillips (1930–2013), Canadian politician
- Art Phillips (composer) (born 1955), American music composer
- Arthur Phillips (born 1969), American novelist
- Arthur Phillips (musician) (1605–1695), English musician and composer
- Arturo Phillips (born 1995), Chilean politician
- Arturo Aldunate Phillips (1902–1985), Chilean poet
- Ary Phillips, American basketball coach
- Ashley Phillips (born 2005), English footballer
- Ashley Phillips (born 1986), American soccer coach
- Augustine Phillips (??–1605), English actor
- Augustus Phillips (1874–1944), American actor
- Aunty Jean Phillips, Australian religious figure
- Autumn Phillips (born 1978), American-English royal
- A'yana Keshelle Phillips (born 1995), Virgin Island model
- Ayotunde Phillips (born 1949), Nigerian judge

=== B ===
- Baker Phillips (1718–1745), English lieutenant
- Barnaby Phillips (born 1968), English television correspondent
- Barney Phillips (1913–1982), American actor
- Barre Phillips (1934–2024), American jazz musician
- Barry Phillips, American musician
- Belinda Phillips (born 1958), Jamaican swimmer
- Bertram Phillips, British film director
- Biddy Phillips (1956–2010), Irish camogie player
- Bijou Phillips (born 1980), American actress
- Billy Phillips (soccer) (born 1956), American soccer player
- B. J. Phillips, American magazine editor
- Bob Phillips (born 1951), American television journalist
- Bob Phillips (basketball) (1917–1992), American basketball player
- Bobbie Phillips (born 1968), American actress
- Brandon Phillips (born 1981), American baseball player
- Brenda Phillips (born 1958), Zimbabwean field hockey player
- Brendon Phillips (born 1954), Jamaican footballer
- Brenton Phillips (born 1962), Australian rules footballer
- Brett Phillips (born 1994), American baseball player
- Brett Phillips (rugby league) (born 1988), Scottish international
- Brewer Phillips (1924–1999), American guitarist
- Brice Phillips, American radio operator
- Britta Phillips (born 1963), American singer-songwriter
- Bryn Phillips (1900–1980), Welsh rugby union footballer
- Bubba Phillips (1928–1993), American baseball player
- Bud Phillips (born 1950), American politician
- Bud Phillips (author) (1929–2017), American author and historian
- Bum Phillips (1923–2013), American football coach
- Burrill Phillips (1907–1988), American composer
- Burt Phillips, American disc jockey
- Burton Phillips (1912–1999), American criminal
- Buz Phillips (1904–1964), American baseball player

=== C ===
- Callum Phillips (born 1992), Scottish rugby league footballer
- Cam Phillips (born 1995), American football player
- Cameron Phillips (broadcaster) (born 1969), Canadian broadcaster
- Carl Phillips (born 1959), American writer
- Carly Phillips (born 1965), American author
- Carroll Phillips (born 1992), American football player
- Carter Phillips (born 1988), American poker player
- Caryl Phillips (born 1958), Kittitian-British novelist
- Carys Phillips (born 1992), Welsh rugby union footballer
- Cat Phillips (born 1991), Australian rules footballer
- Catherine Payton Phillips (1727–1794), Quaker Minister
- Cathy Phillips (born 1960), Canadian ice hockey player
- C. E. S. Phillips (1871–1945), British physicist
- Channing D. Phillips (born 1958), American attorney
- Channing E. Phillips (1928–1987), American minister and activist
- Charisse Phillips, American diplomat
- Chester Arthur Phillips (1882–1976), American academic administrator
- Chichester Phillips (1647–1728), English politician
- Chynna Phillips (born 1968), American singer and actress
- Ciara Phillips (born 1976), Canadian-Irish artist
- Claiborne Hooper Phillips (1847–1886), American politician
- Claire Phillips (1907–1960), American spy
- Claire Phillips (artist) (born 1963), English artist
- Clara Phillips (1898–1969), American showgirl
- Clark Phillips III (born 2001), American football player
- Claude Phillips (1846–1924), British writer
- Coles Phillips (1880–1927), American illustrator
- Colin Phillips, British psycholinguist
- Conor Phillips (born 1999), Irish rugby union footballer
- Conrad Phillips (1925–2016), British actor
- Constantine Phillips (1746–1811), English cricketer
- Courtney Phillips, English actor
- Craig Phillips (born 1971), British television personality
- Craig Phillips (sports administrator) (born 1960), Australian athletic administrator
- Curran Phillips (born 2000), American artistic gymnast

=== D ===
- Damaris Phillips (born 1980), American chef
- Damon Phillips, American entrepreneur
- Darius Phillips (born 1996), American football player
- Dashaun Phillips (born 1991), American football player
- Dayton E. Phillips (1910–1980), American politician
- Dean Phillips (born 1969), American politician and businessman
- Debbie Phillips (born 1969), American politician
- Deborah Phillips (born 1965), Scottish painter
- Dee Phillips (1919–2004), American baseball player
- Delores Phillips (1950–2014), American author
- Del'Shawn Phillips (born 1996), American football player
- Demar Phillips (born 1983), Jamaican footballer
- Dewey Phillips (1926–1968), American disc jockey
- Dewi Zephaniah Phillips (1934–2006), Welsh philosopher
- Dick Phillips (1931–1998), American baseball player and coach
- Dillon Phillips (born 1995), English footballer
- Dode Phillips (1900–1965), American football player and coach
- Dom Phillips (1964–2022), British journalist
- Dorothea Phillips (1886–1973), British social organiser
- Dorothea Phillips (born 1928), British actress
- Dorothy Phillips (1889–1980), American actress
- Dorothy J. Phillips (born 1945), American chemist
- Drew Phillips (born 1998), American podcaster
- Dudley Phillips (1905–1953), South African cricketer
- Dwight Phillips (born 1977), American long-jumper
- Dwight Phillips Jr. (born 2005), American football player

=== E ===
- Earl Norfleet Phillips (born 1940), American diplomat
- Edgar Phillips (1889–1962), Welsh poet
- Edmund Phillips (1932–2020), English cricketer
- Edna Phillips (1907–2003), American harpist
- Edwin Percy Phillips (1884–1967), South African botanist
- E. F. Phillips (1878–1951), American beekeeper
- Elaine Phillips, American politician
- Eleanor Addison Phillips (1874–1952), English academic administrator
- Elihu Phillips (1800–1884), American politician
- Elijah Phillips (1809–1832), American settler
- Eliza Phillips (1823–1916), English activist
- Elmer Phillips (1901–1956), Guyanese cricketer
- Eluned Phillips (1914–2009), Welsh poet
- Emily Phillips, American politician
- Emyr Phillips (born 1987), Welsh rugby league footballer
- Erin Phillips (born 1985), Australian athlete
- Esther Phillips (1935–1984), American singer
- Esther Phillips (poet) (born 1950), Barbadian poet
- Ethan Phillips (born 1955), American actor
- Evan Phillips (born 1994), American baseball player

=== F ===
- Fiona Phillips (born 1961), English journalist
- Fiona Phillips (politician) (born 1970), Australian politician
- Flip Phillips (1915–2001), American saxophonist
- Forrest Phillips (1887–1972), Canadian farmer and politician
- Freddie Phillips (1919–2003), British musician and composer
- Fremont O. Phillips (1865–1936), American lawyer and politician

=== G ===
- Gail Phillips (1944–2021), American businesswoman and politician
- Gareth Phillips, Welsh actor
- Garry Phillips (born 1968), Australian rules footballer
- Garyn Phillips (born 2001), Welsh rugby union footballer
- Geoff Phillips, Australian television presenter
- Geoffrey Phillips (born 1931), English cricketer
- Georgina Phillips, British actress
- Gerald Phillips (1886–1938), Welsh cricketer
- Gerry Phillips (born 1940), Canadian politician
- G. Godfrey Phillips (1900–1965), British barrister
- Giles Phillips (born 1997), American soccer player
- Gin Phillips, American author
- Gladys Phillips (1912–2000), American politician
- Glenda Phillips (born 1945), British swimmer
- Grant-Lee Phillips (born 1963), American singer-songwriter
- Greg Phillips (born 1959), Australian rugby league player
- Gregg Phillips (born 1960), American civil servant
- Gregory A. Phillips (born 1960), American lawyer and judge
- Gretchen Phillips (born 1963), American singer-songwriter
- Gunner Phillips, British soldier

=== H ===
- Hannah Phillips (born 1999), YouTuber
- Harper Phillips (born 1973), American skier
- Harrison Phillips (born 1996), American football player
- Hawthorne Phillips (1914–1975), American judge
- Hayden Phillips (1943–2026), English civil servant
- Hayden Phillips (field hockey) (born 1998), New Zealand field hockey player
- Hazel Phillips (born 1929), English singer
- H. D. Phillips (??–1892), British civil servant
- Heath Phillips (born 1982), American baseball player and coach
- Heather Phillips, American soprano
- Hec Phillips (1889–1948), Canadian athlete
- Herbie Phillips (1935–1995), American trumpeter
- Hermon Phillips (1903–1986), American sprinter
- Hesler Phillips (born 1978), Honduran footballer
- Hilary Phillips (born 1951), Jamaican attorney
- Holly Phillips (born 1969), Canadian writer
- Homer G. Phillips (1880–1931), American lawyer
- Hooty Phillips, American baseball player
- Horatio Frederick Phillips (1845–1924), English pioneer
- Hubert Phillips (1891–1964), British economist
- Hughie Phillips (1864–??), English footballer

=== I ===
- Idris Phillips (1958–2022), American musician
- Ifan Phillips (born 1996), Welsh rugby union footballer
- Irna Phillips (1901–1973), American actress
- Irvin Phillips (born 1960), American football player
- Irvine Phillips (1905–1999), American football player
- Irving Phillips (1904–2000), American cartoonist
- Irving Henry Webster Phillips Sr. (1920–1993), American photojournalist
- Isa Phillips (born 1984), Jamaican hurdler
- Isaac Phillips, American songwriter
- Isaak Phillips (born 2001), Canadian ice hockey player
- Ivor Phillips, English rugby union footballer
- Ivor Phillips (cricketer) (1935–2024), South African cricketer and tennis player

=== J ===
- J. Phillips (baseball), American baseball coach
- Jacob Phillips (born 1999), American football player
- Jaelan Phillips (born 1999), American football player
- Jarred Phillips (born 1995), Canadian soccer player
- Jayne Anne Phillips (born 1952), American novelist
- Jeanne Phillips (born 1942), American advice columnist
- Jenny Phillips (1942–2018), American filmmaker
- Jeremiah Phillips (1812–1879), American missionary
- Jeremy Phillips (born 1951), British academic
- Jermaine Phillips (born 1979), American football player
- J. F. V. Phillips (1899–1987), South African botanist
- Jill Phillips (born 1976), American Christian musician
- J. J. Phillips (born 1944), American poet
- Jock Phillips (born 1947), New Zealand historian
- Joel Daniel Phillips (born 1989), American artist
- Joker Phillips (born 1963), American football player and coach
- Jonas Phillips (1736–1803), American soldier and merchant
- Jonas B. Phillips (1805–1867), American poet
- Jordan Phillips (Canadian Snowboarder) (born 1989), Canadian National Team Freestyle Snowboarder
- Jordan Phillips (born 1992), American football player
- Jordan Phillips (American football, born 2004) (born 2004), American football player
- Jordanna Phillips (born 1990), Canadian-Guyanese footballer
- Josiah Phillips (1830–1894), American soldier
- Jourdana Phillips (born 1990), American model
- J. R. Phillips (born 1970), American baseball player
- Juanita Phillips (born 1963), Australian journalist
- Juanita Maxwell Phillips (1880–1966), Chilean politician
- Judith Phillips (born 1959), British professor
- Julianne Phillips (born 1960), American actress
- Julie Phillips, American writer
- J. V. L. Phillips (1922–2012), Ghanaian civil servant

=== K ===
- Kaitlyn Phillips (born 1997), Australian rugby league footballer
- Kalvin Phillips (born 1995), English footballer
- Karen Phillips (born 1966), Australian swimmer
- Kate Phillips (born 1989), British actress
- Katharine Phillips, American psychiatrist
- Katherine W. Phillips (1972–2020), American business theorist
- Kathleen Phillips, Canadian actress
- Katrina Phillips, American actress and activist
- Keenan Phillips (born 2000), South African footballer
- Keith Phillips (1915–1974), Australian rugby league footballer
- Kenny Phillips (born 1986), American football player
- Kenny Phillips (American football coach) (1959–2015), American football coach
- Kim Phillips (American football) (born 1966), American football player
- Kimberly Phillips, Canadian writer
- Kira Phillips (born 1995), Australian rules footballer
- Kirk Phillips (born 1960), American football player
- Krista Phillips (born 1988), Canadian basketball player
- Kristian Phillips (born 1990), Welsh rugby union footballer
- Kyler Phillips (born 1995), American mixed martial artist
- Kyra Phillips (born 1968), American journalist

=== L ===
- Lami Phillips, Nigerian-American singer
- Lanette Phillips, American film producer
- Lanier W. Phillips (1923–2012), American oceanographer
- Laughlin Phillips (1924–2010), American museum director
- Lauren Phillips (Welsh actress) (born 1981), Welsh actress
- Lauren Phillips (American actress), American pornographic actress
- Lawrence Phillips (1975–2016), American football player
- Lawrence S. Phillips (1927–2015), American businessman
- Layn R. Phillips (born 1952), American judge
- Lazarus Phillips (1895–1986), Canadian lawyer and politician
- Lefty Phillips (1919–1972), American baseball coach and executive
- Lefty Phillips (Negro leagues) (1918–??), American baseball player
- Leigh Phillips (born 1973), Welsh composer
- Lena Madesin Phillips (1881–1955), American lawyer
- Leonard Phillips (1870–1947), New Zealand politician
- Les Phillips (born 1963), English footballer
- Liam Phillips (born 1989), British cyclist
- Lily Phillips (born 2001), British pornographic actress
- Lincoln Phillips (born 1941), Trinidadian footballer
- Lionel Phillips (1855–1936), British-South African financier
- Liz Phillips (born 1951), American artist
- L. J. Phillips (born 2004), American football player
- Lloyd Phillips (1945–2013), South African-New Zealand film producer
- Lockwood Phillips (born 1948), American radio personality
- Logan Phillips (born 1982), American politician
- Lovell Phillips, English clergy
- Loyd Phillips (1945–2020), American football player
- Luke Phillips (born 1975), Australian rugby league footballer and referee
- Lycurgus N. Phillips (1822–1892), American politician and judge from Maryland
- L. Vance Phillips (1858–before 1951), American artist

=== M ===
- Mac Phillips (1898–1963), Canadian politician
- Mackenzie Phillips (born 1959), American singer and actress
- Macon Phillips (born 1978), American public servant
- Maddie Phillips (born 1994), Canadian actress
- Maekiaphan Phillips, Virgin Islander activist
- Maggie Phillips (born 1951), British rower
- Malcolm Phillips (born 1935), English rugby union footballer
- Marc Phillips (born 1953), Welsh politician
- Marie Phillips (born 1976), British writer
- Markus Phillips (born 1999), Canadian ice hockey player
- Marr Phillips (1857–1928), American baseball player
- Marvin Phillips (born 1983), American basketball player
- Maude Gillette Phillips (1860–1951), American author and educator
- Maureen Phillips, Trinidadian cricketer
- McCandlish Phillips (1927–2013), American journalist
- Meg Phillips (born 1996), Australian cricketer
- Mel Phillips (born 1942), American football player
- Melanie Phillips (born 1951), British journalist and writer
- Melba Phillips (1907–2004), American physicist
- Melissa Phillips (born 1987), American soccer coach
- Merilyn Phillips (born 1957), Caymanian cyclist
- Merle Phillips (1928–2013), American politician
- Merlyn Phillips (1896–1978), Canadian ice hockey player
- Michelle Phillips (born 1944), American singer-songwriter
- Mikael Phillips, Jamaican politician
- MJ Phillips (born 1995), Filipino-American volleyball player
- Monifa Phillips, British physicist
- Montague Phillips (1885–1969), British composer
- Morris Mondle Phillips (1870–1948), Australian lawyer
- Moses Phillips, American baseball player
- Moses Dresser Phillips (1813–1859), American publisher
- Mouche Phillips (born 1973), Australian actress
- M. Penn Phillips (1887–1979), American entrepreneur
- Muriel Phillips (1921–2022), American soldier
- Murray Phillips, Australian professor
- Myrna Phillips (born 1942), Canadian politician

=== N ===
- Nathaniel Phillips (born 1997), English footballer
- Neal Phillips (born 1956), Barbadian cricketer
- Nelson Phillips (1873–1939), American judge
- Nevada Phillips (born 1957), Barbadian-English cricketer
- Nicola Phillips, vice-chancellor of Adelaide University from 2026
- Noah J. Phillips (born 1978), American attorney
- Noel Phillips (1883–1961), Welsh cricketer
- Noel Phillips (tennis) (born 1950), Australian tennis player
- Norah Phillips (1910–1992), British politician
- Norbert Phillips (1896–1961), Australian cricketer
- Norris Phillips (1916–1996), American baseball player
- N. Scott Phillips, American politician
- N. Taylor Phillips (1868–1955), American lawyer and politician

=== O ===
- Oliver Phillips (ecologist), British ecologist
- Omar Phillips (born 1986), West Indian cricketer
- Orie Leon Phillips (1885–1974), American judge
- Orlando Phillips (born 1960), American basketball player
- Orville Howard Phillips (1924–2009), Canadian politician
- Ossie Phillips, Australian jockey
- Overton Phillips (1908–1999), American race car driver

=== P ===
- Pat Phillips (1927–1994), Australian rules footballer
- Patricia Phillips, Canadiana actress
- Patrick Phillips (born 1970), American poet
- Paulette Phillips (born 1956), Canadian artist
- Pauline Phillips (1918–2013), American columnist
- Paulo Laserna Phillips (born 1953), Colombian journalist
- Peg Phillips (1918–2002), American actress
- Pharez Phillips (1855–1914), Australian politician
- Philip Phillips (disambiguation)
- Pierce Phillips (born 1992), English rugby union footballer
- P. J. Phillips (born 1986), American baseball player
- Porsha Phillips (born 1988), American basketball player
- Preson Phillips (born 1980), American musician
- Pruvin Phillips (??–2005), English priest
- Pup Phillips (1895–1953), American football player and coach

=== R ===
- Rashad Phillips (born 1978), American basketball player
- Raúl Aldunate Phillips (1906–1979), Chilean writer
- Red Phillips (baseball) (1908–1988), American baseball player
- Redmond Phillips (1912–1993), New Zealand actor
- Rhonda Phillips, American academic administrator
- Rhys Phillips (born 1988), New Zealand cricketer
- Ricardo Phillips (born 1975), Panamanian footballer
- Ricey Phillips (1920–2008), South African cricketer
- Richie Phillips (1940–2013), American lawyer
- Ricky Phillips (born 1952), American guitarist
- Rita Phillips, British sculptor
- Robin Phillips (1940–2015), English actor and film director
- Rodney Phillips (1942–1969), New Zealand chess player
- Rog Phillips (1909–1965), American writer
- Ronnie Phillips (1947–2002), English footballer
- Rory Phillips, American musician
- Rowan Ricardo Phillips (born 1974), American poet
- Roy Phillips (1941–2025), British musician
- Rubel Phillips (1925–2011), American politician
- Ruby Hart Phillips (1898–1985), American news correspondent
- Rudy Phillips (born 1958), American football player
- Rufus Phillips (1929–2021), American writer and businessman
- Rupie Phillips (born 1969), American politician
- Russell Phillips (1969–1995), American race car driver
- Russell Phillips (ice hockey) (1888–1949), Canadian ice hockey player
- Ruth Phillips (born 1945), Canadian art historian

=== S ===
- Sally Phillips (born 1970), British comic actress
- Sandra S. Phillips (born 1945), American writer
- Scottie Phillips (born 1997), American football player
- Sewall A. Phillips (1839–??), American politician
- Shannon Phillips (born 1975), Canadian politician
- Shaun Phillips (born 1981), American football player
- Shawn Phillips (born 1943), American singer-songwriter
- Shilah Phillips, American entertainer
- Siân Phillips (born 1933), Welsh actress
- Sian Phillips (folk musician), Welsh musician
- Sidney Phillips (1924–2015), American Marine
- Simeon Phillips (1847–1925), Australian politician
- Sophie Phillips, American politician
- Stanley Phillips (1891–1954), British philatelist
- Stanley Davis Phillips (1942–2022), American ambassador
- Stephen G. Phillips (1887–1973), American harness racing official and inventor
- Stewart Phillips (born 1961), English footballer
- Stone Phillips (born 1954), American television correspondent
- Susanna Phillips, American singer
- Syd Phillips (1874–1960), Australian rules footballer

=== T ===
- Tappy Phillips (born 1948), American news correspondent
- Tari Phillips (born 1969), American basketball player
- Ta'Shia Phillips (born 1989), American basketball player
- Taylor Phillips (born 1933), American football player
- Ted Phillips (born 1957), American businessman and sports executive
- Ted Phillips (footballer) (1933–2018), English footballer
- Tenaya Phillips (born 1994), Australian basketball player
- T. E. R. Phillips (1868–1942), English astronomer
- Teresa Phillips (born 1958), American athletic administrator
- Teresia Constantia Phillips (1709–1765), British courtesan
- Terry Phillips (born 1953), American journalist
- Terry Don Phillips, American football player and administrator
- Thea Phillips (1892–1960), English-Australian singer
- Thompson Phillips (1832–1909), Irish Archdeacon
- Tomi Kay Phillips, American academic administrator
- Traci Phillips (born 1962), American canoeist
- Tracy Phillips, New Zealand high jumper
- Trey Phillips (tennis) (born 1976), American tennis player
- Tripp Phillips (born 1977), American tennis player
- Tyler Phillips (born 1997), American baseball player
- Tyre Phillips (born 1997), American football player
- Tyrone Phillips (born 1994), Fijian rugby league footballer

=== U ===
- Ulrich Bonnell Phillips (1877–1934), American historian
- Utah Phillips (1935–2008), American labor organizer

=== V ===
- Valerie Phillips, American photographer
- Vel Phillips (1924–2018), American judge
- Verno Phillips (born 1969), Belizean boxer
- Vicki Phillips (born c.1958), American educator
- Vicky Phillips, British solicitor
- Vince Phillips (born 1963), American boxer
- Virginia A. Phillips (born 1957), American judge

=== W ===
- Wade Phillips (born 1947), American football coach
- Waite Phillips (1883–1964), American oilman and philanthropist
- Wal Phillips (1908–1998), English motorcycle speedway racer
- Wally Phillips (1925–2008), American radio personality
- Washington Phillips (1880–1954), American singer
- Watts Phillips (1825–1874), British illustrator
- Waynne Phillips (born 1970), Welsh footballer
- Wendell Phillips (1811-1884), American attorney, abolitionist and orator
- Wendy Phillips (born 1952), American actress
- Wes Phillips (born 1979), American football player and coach
- Winifred Phillips, American musical composer

=== X ===
- Xan Phillips, American poet
- Xavier Phillips (born 1971), French cellist

=== Z ===
- Zach Phillips (born 1986), Mexican-American baseball player
- Zack Phillips (born 1992), Canadian ice hockey player
- Zane Phillips (born 1993), American actor
- Zara Phillips (born 1981), British equestrian
- ZeBarney Thorne Phillips (1875–1942), American chaplain

== Disambiguation pages ==
=== A ===
- Aaron Phillips (disambiguation)
- Adam Phillips (disambiguation)
- Alan Phillips (disambiguation)
- Albert Phillips (disambiguation)
- Alex Phillips (disambiguation)
- Alexandra Phillips (disambiguation)
- Alfred Phillips (disambiguation)
- Amy Phillips (disambiguation)
- Andrew Phillips (disambiguation)
- Andy Phillips (disambiguation)
- Anna Phillips (disambiguation)
- Anne Phillips (disambiguation)
- Anthony Phillips (disambiguation)

=== B ===
- Ben Phillips (disambiguation)
- Bert Phillips (disambiguation)
- Bill Phillips (disambiguation)
- Bobby Phillips (disambiguation)
- Brad Phillips (disambiguation)
- Brian Phillips (disambiguation)
- Bruce Phillips (disambiguation)

=== C ===
- Caroline Phillips (disambiguation)
- Charles Phillips (disambiguation)
- Cheryl Phillips (disambiguation)
- Chris Phillips (disambiguation)
- Christopher Phillips (disambiguation)
- Clarence Phillips (disambiguation)
- Clyde Phillips (disambiguation)
- Cynthia Phillips (disambiguation)

=== D ===
- Daniel Phillips (disambiguation), includes Dan
- Dave Phillips (disambiguation)
- David Phillips (disambiguation)
- Dennis Phillips (disambiguation)
- Derek Phillips (disambiguation)
- Donald Phillips (disambiguation)
- Doug Phillips (disambiguation)
- Duncan Phillips (disambiguation)

=== E ===
- Ed Phillips (disambiguation)
- Eddie Phillips (disambiguation)
- Edward Phillips (disambiguation)
- Elizabeth Phillips (disambiguation)
- Eric Phillips (disambiguation)
- Ernie Phillips (disambiguation)

=== F ===
- Frank Phillips (disambiguation)
- Frederick Phillips (disambiguation)

=== G ===
- Gary Phillips (disambiguation)
- Gene Phillips (disambiguation)
- George Phillips (disambiguation)
- Glenn Phillips (disambiguation)
- Gordon Phillips (disambiguation)
- Graham Phillips (disambiguation)

=== H ===
- Harold Phillips (disambiguation)
- Harry Phillips (disambiguation)
- Helen Phillips (disambiguation)
- Henry Phillips (disambiguation)
- Herbert Phillips (disambiguation)
- Horace Phillips (disambiguation)
- Howard Phillips (disambiguation)
- Hugh Phillips (disambiguation)

=== I ===
- Ian Phillips (disambiguation)

=== J ===
- Jack Phillips (disambiguation)
- James Phillips (disambiguation)
- Jason Phillips (disambiguation)
- Jeff Phillips (disambiguation)
- Jess Phillips (disambiguation)
- Jesse Phillips (disambiguation)
- Jim Phillips (disambiguation)
- Jimmy Phillips (disambiguation)
- John Phillips (disambiguation)
- Jonathan Phillips (disambiguation)
- Jonny Phillips (disambiguation)
- Josh Phillips (disambiguation)
- Julia Phillips (disambiguation)
- Julian Phillips (disambiguation)
- Justin Phillips (disambiguation)

=== K ===
- Kevin Phillips (disambiguation)
- Kieran Phillips (disambiguation)
- Kyle Phillips (disambiguation)

=== L ===
- Larry Phillips (disambiguation)
- Lee Phillips (disambiguation)
- Len Phillips (disambiguation)
- Leon Phillips (disambiguation)
- Leslie Phillips (disambiguation)
- Linda Phillips (disambiguation)
- Lisa Phillips (disambiguation)
- Louis Phillips (disambiguation)

=== M ===
- Marcus Phillips (disambiguation)
- Margaret Phillips (disambiguation)
- Mark Phillips (disambiguation)
- Martin Phillips (disambiguation)
- Mary Phillips (disambiguation)
- Matthew Phillips (disambiguation)
- Michael Phillips (disambiguation)
- Mike Phillips (disambiguation)
- Morgan Phillips (disambiguation)

=== N ===
- Nathan Phillips (disambiguation)
- Nicholas Phillips (disambiguation)
- Nikki Phillips (disambiguation)
- Norman Phillips (disambiguation)

=== O ===
- Ollie Phillips (disambiguation)
- Owen Phillips (disambiguation)

=== P ===
- Paul Phillips (disambiguation)
- Percy Phillips (disambiguation)
- Peter Phillips (disambiguation)
- Philip Phillips (disambiguation)

=== R ===
- Ralph Phillips (disambiguation)
- Randy Phillips (disambiguation)
- Ray Phillips (disambiguation)
- Reginald Phillips (disambiguation)
- Reuben Phillips (disambiguation)
- Richard Phillips (disambiguation)
- Robert Phillips (disambiguation)
- Rod Phillips (disambiguation)
- Roger Phillips (disambiguation)
- Ronald Phillips (disambiguation)
- Rowland Phillips (disambiguation)
- Ryan Phillips (disambiguation)

=== S ===
- Sam Phillips (disambiguation)
- Samuel Phillips (disambiguation)
- Sarah Phillips (disambiguation)
- Saul Phillips (disambiguation)
- Scott Phillips (disambiguation)
- Sean Phillips (disambiguation)
- Sid Phillips (disambiguation)
- Simon Phillips (disambiguation)
- Stephen Phillips (disambiguation)
- Steve Phillips (disambiguation)
- Stu Phillips (disambiguation)
- Susan Phillips (disambiguation)

=== T ===
- Thomas Phillips (disambiguation)
- Tim Phillips (disambiguation)
- Todd Phillips (disambiguation)
- Tom Phillips (disambiguation)
- Tony Phillips (disambiguation)
- Trevor Phillips (disambiguation)

=== V ===
- Van Phillips (disambiguation)

=== W ===
- Walter Phillips (disambiguation)
- Warren Phillips (disambiguation)
- Wayne Phillips (disambiguation)
- Wendell Phillips (disambiguation)
- William Phillips (disambiguation)

== Fictional characters ==
- Kane Phillips, a fictional character on the soap opera Home and Away
- Sarah Phillips, a fictional character on the 2002 DIC Entertainment television cartoon Liberty's Kids
- Trevor Philips, a playable character in the 2013 video game Grand Theft Auto V (Note: Trevor’s surname is “Philips”, a spelling variation of the surname “Phillips”)

== See also ==
- Attorney General Phillips (disambiguation), a disambiguation page for Attorney Generals surnamed Phillips
- Captain Phillips (disambiguation), a disambiguation page for Captains surnamed Phillips
- General Phillips (disambiguation), a disambiguation page for Generals surnamed Phillips
- Governor Phillips (disambiguation), a disambiguation page for Governors surnamed Phillips
- Judge Phillips (disambiguation), a disambiguation page for Judges surnamed Phillips
- Justice Phillips (disambiguation), a disambiguation page for Justices surnamed Phillips
- Senator Phillips (disambiguation), a disambiguation page for Senators surnamed Phillips
- Philips (surname), a disambiguation page for Philips
- Phillip (surname), a disambiguation page for Phillip
- Philipps (disambiguation), a disambiguation page for Philipps
- Phillips (disambiguation), a disambiguation page for Phillips
- Phillipps, a disambiguation page for Phillipps
