= James Phillips =

James, Jim or Jimmy Phillips may refer to:

== Arts and entertainment ==
- James Madhlope Phillips (1919–1987), South African artist
- John Turner (lyricist) (James John Turner Phillips, 1902–1982), English songwriter
- Jim Phillips (illustrator), American graphic designer and cartoonist
- James Phillips (South African musician) (1959–1995), South African rock singer, songwriter and performer
- James Phillips (playwright) (born 1977), British playwright and director
- LRoc (James Elbert Phillips, (fl. 1995–present), American songwriter and producer
- James Phillips (Canadian musician), Canadian multi-instrumentalist, producer and engineer
- James Atlee Phillips (1915–1991), American writer

== Politics and law ==
- James Phillips (MP) (1672–1730), Welsh politician
- James M. Phillips (1822–1891), American politician from Pennsylvania
- James Robert Phillips (1864–1897), British colonial administrator
- Jimmy Phillips (politician) (1913–2002), American politician, Texas state senator
- James Dickson Phillips Jr. (1922–2017), American judge
- Jim Phillips Sr. (1931–2018), American politician, North Carolina state senator
- James T. Phillips (1953–2014), American politician, New Jersey state senator
- James T. Phillips Jr. (died 1980), Liberian politician

== Sports ==
=== Association football (soccer) ===
- James Phillips (footballer) (fl. 1877–1878), Scottish international football player
- Jimmy Phillips (footballer, born 1966), English football player (Bolton Wanderers)
- Jimmy Phillips (footballer, born 1989), English football player (Gateshead)

=== Cricket ===
- James Phillips (English cricketer) (1849–1905), English cricketer
- Jim Phillips (cricketer) (1860–1930), Australian cricketer
- James Phillips (South African cricketer) (born 1963), South African cricketer

=== Other sports ===
- Jim Phillips (American football) (1936–2015), American football wide receiver
- James Phillips (kickboxer) (born 1980), German-American kickboxer and martial artist
- James Phillips (rugby union) (born 1987), English rugby union player
- James Phillips (badminton) (born 1984), Welsh badminton player
- James J. Phillips (fl. 2004–present), American college athletic administrator

== Others ==
- James Liddell Phillips (1840–1895), Indian medical and religious missionary
- James Milner Phillips (1905–1974), English engineer and businessman
- James F. Phillips (1930–2001), American environmental activist who worked under the pseudonym the Fox
- James Charles Phillips (born 1933), American physicist
- James Andrew Phillips, Australian philosopher

== See also ==
- James Philipps (1594–1675), Welsh politician
