= Thomas Philips =

Thomas Philips may refer to:

- Thomas Philips (Irish politician), Parliament of Ireland MP
- Thomas J. Philips (1846–1939), American politician from Pennsylvania

== See also ==
- Thomas Phillips (disambiguation)
