= Wright-Phillips =

Wright-Phillips is a surname. Notable people with the surname include:

- Shaun Wright-Phillips, English footballer
- Bradley Wright-Phillips, English footballer, brother of Shaun
- D'Margio Wright-Phillips, English footballer, son of Shaun

== See also ==
- Wright (surname)
- Phillips (surname)
