= Thomas W. Phillips =

Thomas W. Phillips may refer to:

- Thomas Wharton Phillips (1835–1912), member of the U.S. House of Representatives from Pennsylvania
- Thomas Wharton Phillips Jr. (1874–1956), also a member of the U.S. House of Representatives from Pennsylvania
- Thomas Williams Phillips (1883–1966), British civil servant
- Thomas W. Phillips (judge) (born 1943), federal judge to the United States District Court for the Eastern District of Tennessee

== See also ==
- Thomas Phillips (disambiguation)
