= Brad Phillips =

Brad or Bradley Phillips may refer to:

- Brad Phillips (soccer) (born 1987), South African football player
- Brad Phillips (artist) (born 1974), Canadian painter
- Brad Phillips (actor) (1955–2024), American actor, adult film performer, director, and disc jockey
- Bradley Phillips (Wisconsin minister) (1818–1904), American minister and politician

== See also ==
- Bradley Wright-Phillips (born 1985), English footballer
