= Gladys Phillips =

American politician

Member of the Washington House of Representatives from the 21st district
- In office January 8, 1951 – January 12, 1953 Serving with Harold B. Kellogg; Elmer Huhta
- Preceded by: Arthur L. Callow; Andrew Winberg; Grace Kelley
- Succeeded by: Elmer Huhta; John K. Yearout; Harry S. Elway, Jr.

Personal details
- Born: 1912 Aberdeen, Washington, U.S.
- Died: March 26, 2000 (aged 87–88)
- Party: Republican
- Spouse: Lester "Pinky" O'Day
- Education: University of Washington (B.A., J.D.)
- Occupation: Attorney

Gladys Phillips (1912 – March 26, 2000) was an American politician who served as a member of the Washington House of Representatives from 1951 to 1953. She represented Washington's 21st legislative district as a Republican.

== Personal life and education ==
Phillips was the daughter of Ernestine and James Marston Phillips. Her father was an attorney and politician who served as mayor of the family's home town of Aberdeen, Washington; a Washington State legislator; and eventually a judge in superior court for Grays Harbor County.

She attended University of Washington for both her bachelor's and law degrees, graduating as one of six women in the University of Washington School of Law class of 1935. In 1947, she married Lester "Pinky" O'Day, an insurance agent.

== Legislative career ==
She served only one term in the legislature, later telling The Daily World that she "didn't care for the legislature" because it "didn't matter how hard you worked", and that she went to the legislature to work, but found that "[t]here was all kinds of monkey business up there."

== Career outside the legislature ==
For over sixty years, she ran a prominent law firm in Aberdeen.
