= Linda Phillips =

Linda Phillips may refer to:

- Linda Phillips (politician) (born 1952), member of the West Virginia House of Delegates
- Linda Phillips (musician) (1899–2002), Australian composer, pianist and music critic
- Linda Gilbert Saucier, née Phillips, American mathematician and textbook author
