= Doug Phillips =

Doug Phillips may refer to:

- Doug Phillips (politician) (born 1946), Canadian businessman and politician
- Doug Phillips (rugby) (1919–2000), Welsh rugby union footballer
- Doug Phillips (speaker) (born 1965), American Christian speaker
- Doug Phillips (American football) (born 1968), American football coach
- Douglas Phillips (designer) (1922-1995), American stained glass designer
