= Daniel Phillips =

Daniel or Dan Phillips may refer to:

- Daniel Phillips (make-up artist), English special effects make-up artist
- Daniel Phillips (physicist), physicist at Ohio University
- Daniel Phillips (sailor) (born 1971), Australian Olympic sailor
- Daniel Phillips (footballer) (born 2001), English-Trinidadian footballer
- Dan Phillips (builder), American designer and builder
