= Christopher Phillips (disambiguation) =

Christopher Phillips (born 1959) is an American writer.

Christopher or Chris Phillips may also refer to:

- Chris Phillips (born 1978), Canadian hockey player
- Chris Phillips (chief executive) (1956–2007), chief executive of Scottish Widows
- Chris Phillips (hurdler) (born 1972), retired American athlete
- Chris Phillips (professor), British physicist
- Chris Phillips (voice actor) (born 1958), American voice actor, screenwriter and singer
- Christopher H. Phillips (1920–2008), American diplomat and politician
- Chris Philipps (born 1994), Luxembourgish international footballer
- Chris Phillips (West Virginia politician) (born 1969), American politician from West Virginia

== See also ==
- Chris Philp (born 1976), British politician
