= Anthony Phillips (disambiguation) =

Anthony Phillips (born 1951) is an English guitarist.

Anthony Phillips may also refer to:

- Anthony Phillips (baseball) (born 1990), South African baseball player
- Anthony Phillips (offensive lineman) (born 1966), American football player
- Anthony Phillips (defensive back) (born 1970), American football player
- Anthony Phillips (weightlifter) (1940–2008), Barbadian Olympic weightlifter
- Anthony Phillips (Philadelphia politician) (born 1988/1989), Philadelphia city councilmember
- Anthony Phillips (Wisconsin politician), member of the Wisconsin State Assembly

== See also ==
- Tony Phillips (disambiguation)
