= Cheryl Phillips =

Cheryl Phillips may refer to:

- Cheryl Phillips (journalist), data journalist and professor
- Cheryl Phillips (politician) (born 1962) South African politician
