= Alexander Phillips =

Alexander Phillips may refer to:

- Alexander Phillips (politician) (fl. 1818–1842)
- Alexander M. Phillips, author (1907–1991)

== See also ==
- Alexandra Phillips (disambiguation)
- Alex Phillips (disambiguation)
