= Hugh Phillips =

Hugh Phillips may refer to:

- Hugh Phillips (surgeon) (1940–2005), British surgeon
- Hugh Phillips (referee) (1921–1996), Scottish football referee
- Hugh Phillips (cricketer) (1929–2018), English cricketer
- Hugh Phillips Engineering, Wales manufacturer of steam locomotive valves and controls
