= Ivor Phillips (cricketer) =

South African cricketer (1935–2024)

Personal information
- Full name: Ivor Leroy Phillips
- Born: 3 August 1935; Queenstown, South Africa
- Died: 7 January 2024 (aged 88)
- Batting: Right-handed
- Relatives: Leroy Phillips (son); James Phillips (son)

Domestic team information
- Years: Team
- 1957/58–1958/59: Border

Career statistics
Competition	First-class
Matches	3
Runs scored	61
Batting average	10.16
100s/50s	0/0
Top score	30
Catches/stumpings	1/–
- Source: Cricinfo, 1 December 2022

Ivor Leroy Phillips (3 August 1935 – 7 January 2024) was a South African cricketer and tennis player.

== Biography ==
Phillips attended Queen's College in Queenstown, where he excelled at sports. He was offered a scholarship to Stellenbosch University, but instead returned to work on the family farm at Tarkastad. Among a group of young South African tennis players, including his fellow Border cricketer Buster Farrer, Phillips competed at the 1956 Wimbledon Championships. He and Farrer won their first-round match in the men's doubles, but lost in the second.

Phillips played as a middle-order batsman in three first-class matches for Border in 1957–58 and 1958–59. He played for the South African Country Districts XI for 19 years, captaining them for 16 years.

He later farmed in the Molteno district before retiring in 1999. He and his wife Leslie-Anne lived in Port Alfred. They had four children. Their sons James and Leroy played first-class cricket in South Africa.

Phillips died on 7 January 2024, at the age of 88.
