= Ian Phillips =

Ian Phillips may refer to:

- Ian Phillips (footballer) (born 1959)
- Ian Phillips (philosopher)
- Ian Phillips (American politician)
- Ian Phillips (South African politician) (c. 1958–2007)
