= Howard Phillips =

Howard Phillips may refer to:

- Howard Phillips (activist) (1941–2013), three-time United States presidential candidate
- Howard Phillips (consultant) (born 1958), American video game consultant and producer
- Howard Phillips (philanthropist) (1902–1979), American businessman and philanthropist in Florida
- Howard Phillips (cricketer) (1872–1960), English cricketer
- Howard Baron Phillips (1909–1985), baritone with Ray Nobel and His Orchestra

== See also ==
- H. P. Lovecraft (Howard Phillips Lovecraft, 1890–1937), fiction author
