= Ernie Phillips =

Ernie Phillips may refer to:

- Ernie Phillips (baseball), baseball player
- Ernie Phillips (footballer) (1923–2004), English footballer
