= Frederick Phillips =

Frederick or Fred Phillips may refer to:

- Frederick Phillips (field hockey) (1884–1948), Welsh field hockey player, Olympic bronze 1908
- Sir Frederick Phillips (civil servant) (1884–1943), British civil servant
- Fred Phillips (footballer) (1905–1933), Australian footballer
- Fred Phillips (make-up artist) (1908–1993), American make-up artist
- Freddie Phillips (died 2003), British film and television musician and composer
- Frederick Albert Phillips (1918–2011), governor of Saint Kitts and Nevis 1967–1969
- Ric Flair (born 1949), professional wrestler whose birth name has been recorded as Fred Phillips

== See also ==
- Frederick Philipse (disambiguation)
