= Philip Phillips =

Philip Philips or its variants may refer to:

- Philip Philipse (1663–1699), son of the first Lord of the Manor of Philipseborough, New York City
- Philip Phillips (bishop) (died 1787), Irish Roman Catholic archbishop of Tuam
- Philip Phillips (lawyer) (1807–1884), American lawyer and congressman
- Philip Phillips (photographer) (19th century), merchant seaman and photographer
- Philip Philips (1831–1913), mayor of Auckland, New Zealand, 1871–74
- Philip Phillips (businessman) (1874–1959), American businessman and philanthropist and namesake of the community of Dr. Phillips, Florida
- Philip Phillips (archaeologist) (1900–1994), American archaeologist
- Phil Phillips (1931–2020), singer and songwriter
- Philip Phillips (physicist), theoretical condensed matter physicist
- Phillip Phillips (born 1990), singer and songwriter, winner of season 11 of American Idol
- Phil Phillips, a puppet from the film The Happytime Murders
