= Marcus Phillips =

Marcus Phillips may refer to:

- Marcus Phillips (musician) from America
- Marcus Phillips (footballer) (born 1973) of Waitakere United
- Marcus Phillips (baseball) Tennessee Volunteer and Red Sox Draftee
- Marcus Phillips, a 26-year-old African-American man killed leading to Diamond Shamrock and Kwik Stop Boycott protests
- Markus Phillips, a Canadian ice hockey defenceman
