= Frederick Philipse (disambiguation) =

Frederick Philipse (1626–1702), was a Dutch immigrant to North America, was first Lord of Philipsburg Manor, New York

Frederick Philipse may also refer to:

- Frederick Philipse II (c. 1698–1751), colonial American merchant, landowner, and politician
- Frederick Philipse III (1720–1785), third and last Lord of Philipsburg Manor

== See also ==
- Frederick Phillips (disambiguation)
- Philipse family, a prominent Dutch family in Colonial America
