= Frank Phillips =

Francis of Frank Phillips may refer to:

- Francis Phillips (footballer) (1857–1935), English footballer and colonial administrator
- Frank Phillips (cricketer) (1873–1955), English cricketer
- Frank Phillips (Missouri politician) (1862–1926), American politician
- Frank Phillips (oilman) (1873–1950), founded Phillips Petroleum in Bartlesville, Oklahoma
- Frank Phillips (golfer) (1932–2023), Australian professional golfer
- Frank V. Phillips (1912–1994), American cinematographer in Bedknobs and Broomsticks
