= Alex Phillips =

Alex Phillips may refer to:

- Alex Phillips (cinematographer) (1900–1977), Canadian-Mexican cinematographer
- Alex Phillips (Green politician) (born 1985), British MEP and Mayor of Brighton
- Alex Phillips (poet), American academic
- Alex Phillips (TV presenter) (born 1983), British journalist and Brexit Party MEP

== See also ==
- Alexandra Phillips (disambiguation)
- Alexander Phillips (disambiguation)
- Alex Phillis (born 1994), Australian motorcyclist
