= Leroy Phillips =

South African cricketer (born 1964)

Personal information
- Born: 7 July 1964 (age 62); Queenstown, South Africa
- Relatives: Ivor Phillips (father)
- Source: Cricinfo, 12 December 2020

Leroy Phillips (born 7 July 1964) is a South African former cricketer. He played in 22 first-class and 11 List A matches from 1984/85 to 1989/90.
