= John Phillips (South African cricketer) =

South African cricketer (1910–1985)

Personal information
- Full name: John Glanville Phillips
- Born: 8 November 1910; East London, Cape Province, South Africa
- Died: 20 June 1985 (aged 74); Amanzimtoti, Natal, South Africa
- Batting: Left-handed
- Bowling: Slow left-arm wrist-spin
- Relatives: Ricey Phillips (brother)

Domestic team information
- Years: Team
- 1931/32–1935/36: Border
- 1937/38: Transvaal

Career statistics
Competition	First-class
Matches	16
Runs scored	667
Batting average	23.00
100s/50s	1/3
Top score	100
Balls bowled	822
Wickets	22
Bowling average	22.13
5 wickets in innings	2
10 wickets in match	0
Best bowling	7/51
Catches/stumpings	5/–
- Source: Cricinfo, 10 May 2020

John Glanville Phillips (8 November 1910 – 26 June 1985) was a South African cricketer who played 16 matches of first-class cricket for Border and Transvaal between 1931 and 1938.

John Phillips was an opening batsman and left-arm wrist-spinner. His best batting performance was 100 and 36 for Border against Orange Free State in the Currie Cup in 1933–34. In the 1934–35 season he took 15 wickets in two Currie Cup matches in East London in just over a week: 7 for 51 and 2 for 87 in a victory over Orange Free State, then 5 for 123 and 1 for 44 in a close loss to Natal. These performances led the cricket writer Louis Duffus to name him as a player "who is sure to be heard of in subsequent seasons". However, Phillips played only two more first-class matches.
