= Ollie Phillips =

Ollie Phillips may refer to:

- Ollie Phillips (rugby union) (born 1983), rugby union player
- Ollie Phillips (Home and Away), a fictional character on the Australian soap opera Home And Away

Oliver Phillips may refer to:

- Oliver Phillips (ecologist), a British tropical ecologist
