= Justice Phillips =

Justice Phillips may refer to:

- Hawthorne Phillips (1914–1975), justice of the Texas Supreme Court
- Jesse J. Phillips (1837–1901), associate justice of the Illinois Supreme Court
- Joseph Phillips (judge) (1784–1857), associate justice of the Illinois Supreme Court
- Nelson Phillips (1873–1939), chief justice of the Texas Supreme Court
- Peter Phillips (judge) (1731–1807), associate justice of the Rhode Island Supreme Court
- Thomas R. Phillips (born 1949), chief justice of the Texas Supreme Court

== See also ==
- Judge Phillips (disambiguation)
