= Saul Phillips =

Saul Phillips is the name of:

- Saúl Phillips (born 1984), Costa Rican footballer
- Saul Phillips (basketball) (born 1972), American college basketball head coach and former player
