= Matthew Phillips =

Matt or Matthew Phillips may refer to:

- Matt Phillips (born 1991), Scottish international footballer (Blackpool FC, QPR, West Brom)
- Matthew Phillips (climber) (born 2000), British paraclimber
- Matthew Phillips (ice hockey) (born 1998), Canadian professional ice hockey player
- Matthew Phillips (rugby union) (born 1975), New Zealand-born Italian rugby union footballer
