= Susan Phillips =

Susan Phillips may refer to:

- Susan Phillips (politician) (born 1949), Missouri politician
- Susan A. Phillips (born 1969), American anthropologist and criminologist
- Susan Elizabeth Phillips (born 1948), American romance author
- Susan M. Phillips (born 1944), American economist
- Susan Phillips (architect) (born 1958), Australian architect
- Susan K. Phillips (1831–1897), English poet
- Susan Burney (1755–1800), later known as Susanna Elizabeth Phillips, English correspondent
- Susan Phillips, mayor of Bournemouth

== See also ==
- Susan Philipsz (born 1965), Scottish artist
