= Gordon Phillips =

Gordon Phillips may refer to:

- Gordon Phillips (economist) (born 1964), American economist and author
- Gordon Phillips (footballer) (1946–2018), English football goalkeeper and coach
- Gordon Phillips (priest) (1911–1982), Anglican priest and author

== See also ==
- Gordon Rich-Phillips (born 1974), Australian politician
