= Julian Phillips =

Julian Phillips may refer to:

- Julian Phillips (TV presenter)
- Julian Phillips (basketball) (born 2003)

== See also ==
- Julian Philips, British composer
