= Preson Phillips =

- Birth name: Thomas Preson Phillips
- Also known as: Tommy Preson Phillips
- Born: October 7, 1980 (age 45) Orange, California
- Origin: Tampa, Florida
- Genres: Worship, indie folk, Southern rock
- Occupation(s): Singer, songwriter
- Instrument: Vocals
- Years active: 2008–present
- Labels: Come&Live!
- Website: presonphillips.com

Thomas Preson "Tommy" Phillips (born October 7, 1980), who goes by the stage name Preson Phillips, is an American Christian musicIan, author, and pastor of Seminole Heights' Watermark Church, who primarily plays a folk rock, roots rock, and Southern rock style of worship music. He has released four studio albums, The Observant & the Anawim in 2008, Weep...He Loves The Mourner's Tears in 2010, Wrath in 2011, and In Our Winters in 2014.

== Early and personal life ==
Phillips was born on October 7, 1980, in Orange, California, as Thomas Preson Phillips, who grew up to pastor Seminole Heights’ Watermark Church, located in Tampa, Florida, where he resides with his wife and children.

== Music career ==
His music recording career began in 2008, with the studio album, The Observant & the Anawim, that was released on June 28, 2008, from Come&Live! Records. The second studio album, Weep...He Loves The Mourner's Tears, was released on March 16, 2010, by Come&Live! Records. Their subsequent release, Wrath, was released on November 1, 2011, with Come&Live! Records. He released, In Our Winters, on June 3, 2014, independently.

== Band members ==
Current members

- Thomas Preson "Tommy" Phillips
- Rachel Collins
- Nate Murray
- Mickey Holm

== Discography ==
Studio albums

- The Observant & the Anawim (June 28, 2008, Come&Live!)
- Weep...He Loves The Mourner's Tears (March 16, 2010, Come&Live!)
- Wrath (November 1, 2011, Come&Live!)
- In Our Winters (June 3, 2014, Independent)
- Tempters (June 5, 2019, Independent)
