= Morgan Phillips (disambiguation) =

Morgan Phillips (1902–1963) was a Welsh Labour Party organiser.

Morgan Phillips may also refer to:

- Morgan Phillips (priest) (died 1570), Welsh academic and Roman Catholic priest
- Morgan Hector Phillips (1885–1953), Welsh headmaster of Ruthin School
- Morgan W. Phillips (1943–1996), American architectural conservationist
- Morgan Phillips (born c.1969), American pop artist known as The Sucklord
- Morgan Phillips (sport shooter) (born 1998), American sport shooter
