= Warren Phillips =

Warren Phillips may refer to:

- Warren G. Phillips (born 1954), American schoolteacher
- Warren H. Phillips (1926–2019), American journalist
