= Wayne Phillips =

Wayne Phillips may refer to:

- Wayne B. Phillips (born 1958), South Australian cricketer who played 27 Tests and 48 One Day Internationals for Australia
- Wayne N. Phillips (born 1962), Victorian cricketer who played one Test for Australia
- Wayne Phillips (politician) (born 1952), Australian politician
- Waynne Phillips (born 1970), Welsh footballer

== See also ==
- Wayne Phillip (born 1977), West Indian cricketer
