= Marcus Phillips (musician) =

American singer-songwriter

Marcus Phillips is an American singer/songwriter, actor, filmmaker, and breakdancer.

== Music ==
Marcus Phillips wrote, recorded, and produced music with his brother, Anthony Phillips, from their recording studio in Michigan, Rainwall Studios. Their discography includes 2 full-length CDs, Mud (1999) and A Summer of Yield (2001), as well as 2 singles, Greenweave (1998) and Angel on the Sidewalk (2003). Marcus contributed original songs to the soundtrack of the independent feature film Façade (2005), the short film "Three Little Words" (2005). His music also appeared on the benefit album Band Together: to Fight Measles (2008), alongside that of classmate Kina Grannis and neighbor Michael Mazochi.

Marcus Phillips is now located in San Francisco, but "hobo" touring with songs from his new album, Thirst and Burden (2009/2010), recorded in Milwaukee.

== Film ==
Phillips began his career in the entertainment business as a child actor. His film work includes an uncredited role in Addams Family Values.

== Breakdancing ==
Phillips was trained in Brighton, England by JP Omari of Floor Crusaders fame starting in 2003. His style reflects his extensive martial arts background: Phillips is a recommended black belt in Tae Kwon Do and has experience with Capoeira, Ju-Jitsu, and Judo. He has performed in Barcelona, Brighton, and Los Angeles.
