= Brian Phillips =

Brian Phillips may refer to:

- Brian Phillips (footballer) (1931–2012), English professional footballer
- Brian Phillips (swimmer) (born 1954), Canadian former swimmer
