= Judge Phillips =

Judge Phillips may refer to:

- Beth Phillips (born 1969), judge of the United States District Court for the Western District of Missouri
- Gregory A. Phillips (born 1960), judge of the United States District Court for the Western District of Missouri
- Harry Phillips (judge) (1909–1985), judge of the United States Court of Appeals for the Sixth Circuit
- James Dickson Phillips Jr. (1922–2017), judge of the United States Court of Appeals for the Fourth Circuit
- John Finis Philips (1834–1919), judge of the United States District Court for the Western District of Missouri
- Layn R. Phillips (born 1952), district judge of the United States District Court for the Western District of Oklahoma
- Orie Leon Phillips (1885–1974), judge of the United States Court of Appeals for the Tenth Circuit
- Percy W. Phillips (1892–1969), judge of the United States Tax Court
- Thomas W. Phillips (judge) (born 1943), judge of the United States District Court for the Eastern District of Tennessee
- Virginia A. Phillips (born 1957), judge of the United States District Court for the Central District of California

== See also ==
- Justice Phillips (disambiguation)
