= Eric Phillips =

Eric Phillips or Philips may refer to:

- Eric Phillips (athlete) (born 1954), Venezuelan Olympic sprinter
- Eric Philips (explorer) (born 1962), Australian polar explorer, adventurer and polar guide
- Eric Philips (politician) (born 1976), American businessman and member of the Virginia House of Delegates
- Eric Phillips, a character on the soap opera Home and Away
