= Jesse Phillips =

Jesse Phillips may refer to:

- Jesse Phillips (canoeist) (born 1986), Australian canoeist
- Jesse J. Phillips (1837–1901), American jurist
- Jesse S. Phillips (1871–1954), American politician
