= Lisa Phillips =

Lisa Phillips may refer to:

- Lisa Phillips (museum director) (fl. 1975–2013), American museum director, curator, and author
- Lisa Phillips (civil servant) (fl. 2016–2018), Governor of Saint Helena, Ascension and Tristan da Cunha
- Lisa Phillips (lawn bowls) (born 1993), Australian lawn bowler
- Lisa Philipps (fl. 1988–2017), Canadian law professor
