= Margaret Phillips =

Margaret Phillips may refer to:

- Margaret Phillips (actress) (1923–1984), Welsh actress
- Margaret A. Phillips (born 1959), American biologist
- Margaret Mann Phillips (1906–1987), British academic
