= Gary Phillips =

Gary Phillips may refer to:

- Gary Phillips (basketball) (1939–2025), basketball player
- Gary Phillips (English footballer) (born 1961), English football player
- Gary Phillips (Australian soccer) (born 1963), Australian former soccer player and coach
- Gary Phillips (rugby league), New Zealand international
- Gary Phillips (EastEnders) fictional character from EastEnders
- Gary Phillips (keyboardist) (1947–2007), late keyboardist with the Greg Kihn Band
- Gary Phillips (writer) (born 1955), mystery writer who also created the comic book series Angeltown
