= Randy Phillips =

Randy Phillips may refer to:

- Randy Phillips (politician) (born 1950), member of the Alaska Legislature from 1977 to 2003
- Randy Phillips (music producer) (born 1954 or 1955), American music producer, president of Anschutz Entertainment Group
- Randy Phillips (soccer) (born 1959), American soccer player
- Randy Phillips, Texas pastor, member of the musical group Phillips, Craig and Dean
- Randy Phillips (American football) (born 1987), American football safety
- Randy Phillips (airman) (born 1990), American airman who used social media to reveal his homosexuality
