= Sid Phillips =

Sid Phillips may refer to:

- Sid Phillips (musician) (1907–1973), English jazz musician
- Sidney Phillips (1924–2015), American physician and US Marine
- Sid Phillips (Toy Story), voiced by Erik von Detten, the main antagonist in the 1995 film Toy Story
