= Duncan Phillips =

Duncan Phillips may refer to:

- Duncan Phillips (musician), drummer with the Christian pop rock band Newsboys
- Duncan Phillips (art collector) (1886–1966), American art collector and critic
