= Nicholas Phillips =

Nicholas or Nick Phillips may refer to:

- Nick Phillips (cricketer) (born 1974), English cricketer
- Nick Phillips, Baron Phillips of Worth Matravers (born 1938), British judge
- Nicholas J. Phillips (1933–2009), English physicist
- Nick Phillips (graphic designer) (born 1962)
