= Tim Phillips =

Tim Phillips may refer to:

- Tim Phillips (cricketer) (born 1981), English cricketer
- Tim Phillips (musician), Canadian-born musician
- Tim Phillips (political strategist) (born 1964), president of Americans for Prosperity from 2006-2021
- Tim Phillips (swimmer) (born 1990), American swimmer
- Tim Charles Phillips (born 1966), American investment manager, political activist and philanthropist

== See also ==
- Tim Phillipps, Australian actor
