= Katharine Phillips =

American psychiatrist

Katharine A. Phillips
- Education: Dartmouth College, Geisel School of Medicine
- Occupation: Professor of Psychiatry
- Known for: Research on body dysmorphic disorder

Katharine A. Phillips is an American psychiatrist who specializes in body dysmorphic disorder. She is a professor of psychiatry at NewYork-Presbyterian and Weill Cornell Medicine. She has contributed to more than 350 scientific journals and books and has been featured in interviews with numerous media outlets, such as the New York Times, The Wall Street Journal, Washington Post, and Boston Globe.

She was featured as a guest on the Oprah Winfrey Show and has written many acclaimed books, including The Broken Mirror: Understanding and Treating Body Dysmorphic Disorder and Understanding Body Dysmorphic Disorder: An Essential Guide. To address body dysmorphic disorder in males, she co-authored The Adonis Complex: How to Identify, Treat and Prevent Body Obsession in Men and Boys.

Phillips has been board certified member of the American Board of Psychiatry and Neurology and, as of 2019, she is a Distinguished Life Fellow of American Psychiatric Association. In addition to these achievements, she is also the member of the Body Dysmorphic Disorder Foundation and has spoken at numerous events hosted by the organization.

== Select publications ==
- Phillips, K.A., Dufresne, R.G. Body Dysmorphic Disorder. Am J Clin Dermatol 1, 235–243 (2000). https://doi.org/10.2165/00128071-200001040-00005
- Phillips, Katharine A. M.D.; Diaz, Susan F. M.D.1 Gender Differences in Body Dysmorphic Disorder, The Journal of Nervous & Mental Disease: September 1997 - Volume 185 - Issue 9 - p 570-577
- Phillips, K. A., McElroy, S. L., Keck, P. E., Pope, H. G., & Hudson, J. I. (1993). Body dysmorphic disorder: 30 cases of imagined ugliness. American Journal of Psychiatry, 150, 302-302.
- Phillips K. A. (2007). Suicidality in Body Dysmorphic Disorder. Primary Psychiatry, 14(12), 58–66.

== See also ==
- Body dysmorphic disorder
- Weill Cornell Medicine
