= Julia Phillips (disambiguation) =

Julia Phillips (1944–2002) was an American film producer.

Julia Phillips may also refer to:

- Julia Phillips (author) (born 1989), American author
- Julia Phillips (physicist) (born 1954), American physicist
- Julia Phillips (artist) (born 1985), German-American artist
