= Helen Phillips =

Helen Phillips may refer to:

- Helen Phillips (soprano) (1919–2005), American dramatic lyric soprano
- Helen Phillips (artist) (1913–1995), American sculptor, printmaker, and graphic artist
- Helen Phillips (novelist) (born 1981), American novelist
- Helen Plummer Phillips (1850–1929) Australian educator, missionary and philanthropist
