= Ralph Phillips =

Ralph Phillips is the name of:

- Ralph Phillips (Looney Tunes), a Looney Tunes character
- Ralph Phillips (footballer) (1933–2011), English footballer
- Ralph "Bucky" Phillips (born 1962), American criminal
- Ralph S. Phillips (1913–1998), American mathematician

== See also ==
- Ralph Phillips Lowe, former Governor of Iowa
