= Brad Phillips (actor) =

American actor, adult film performer, and disc jockey (1955–2024)

- Born: Steven Richard Casavant; February 6, 1955; Glendale, California, U.S.
- Died: March 13, 2024 (aged 69); San Francisco, California, U.S.
- Other name: Steven Oliver
- Occupations: Actor; Adult film performer; Model; Disc jockey; Director; Personal trainer
- Years active: 1984–2024
- Agent: Falcon Studios
- Partner: William Brogan (1998–2024)

Steven Richard Casavant (February 6, 1955 – March 13, 2024), known professionally as Brad Phillips and later as DJ Pirate Steve, was an American actor, adult film performer, model, director, and disc jockey. He is recognized for his prolific career in adult cinema during the 1980s and 1990s also his appearances in the first season of Star Trek: The Next Generation. Following his retirement from film, he became a fixture of the San Francisco nightlife and fitness community for over three decades.

== Early life ==
Casavant was born in Glendale, California (with ties to Orange County). He maintained a close relationship with his family throughout his life, particularly his mother, Lynn Casavant. During the mid-1980s, his "All-American" athletic aesthetic led him to pursue work in the entertainment industry in Southern California.

== Career ==
=== Modeling (1984) ===
Steve Casavant began his career in the adult industry as a print and catalog model. He became known for his handsome appearance and lean, muscular build. This led to extensive modeling work for gay adult magazines, as well as advertisements and stills, which helped him gain initial popularity in Hollywood.t

=== Adult Film Career (1984–2011) ===
Performing as Brad Phillips, Casavant debuted in 1984 with the film The Company We Keep. His career coincided with the "Golden Age" of high-budget adult features, where he became a sought-after lead due to his "lean muscle" physique. Throughout his twenty seven-year peak, he worked with elite directors of the era, including John Travis, Rick Stevens, and Gino Colbert. He was a mainstay for top-tier studios such as Falcon Studios, Catalina Video, and StudVision. He appeared in Pacific Coast Highway (1988), Flexx (1989) which was Directed by John Travis, Straight Boys Do! (1990), and Bi-Swingers (1991). Phillips was known for a charismatic, high-energy screen presence, which he would later translate into his musical career. After 1991, he largely stepped away from the industry, with only rare archive appearances or small independent cameos (such as 2002's F-Train to Castro) occurring thereafter. He became a prominent performer known for his athletic physique, appearing in approximately thirty four films through 1999.

=== Acting and Star Trek (1987) ===
Under his birth name, Steve Casavant, he worked as a background actor and body double in Hollywood. He was initially hired as a fitting model for the Starfleet uniforms during the production of the first season of Star Trek: The Next Generation. He subsequently appeared as a background extra in over ten episodes, most notably as an Edo in the episode "Justice" and a role in "Lonely Among Us". His lean, muscular build made him a frequent choice for background roles on the bridge and corridors of the USS Enterprise-D.

=== San Francisco and DJ Pirate Steve (1989–2024) ===
In 1989, Casavant moved to San Francisco, marking a pivotal shift in his life. He reinvented himself as DJ Pirate Steve, becoming a popular figure in the city's club and party circuit. He often described his music as a "ministry," a way to spread joy and infectious energy to the dance floor. Outside of music, Casavant was a dedicated personal trainer and masseuse, emphasizing fitness and well-being. He was an active member of the San Francisco cycling community and a faithful congregant of St. Francis Lutheran Church.

== Personal life ==
He was in a relationship with porn actor Butch Taylor but later they broke up. Casavant was a long-term resident of the Duboce Triangle neighborhood. Casavant was in a committed relationship with his partner, William Brogan, for 26 years. He was known for his love of his cat, Wiwi, and was an avid fan of classic sitcoms like Seinfeld and The Sound of Music.

== Death ==
Steve Casavant died peacefully in his San Francisco apartment on March 13, 2024, at the age of 69, with his partner by his side. A memorial service was held on April 20, 2024, at St. Francis Lutheran Church in San Francisco.

== Filmography ==
=== Television ===
Year	Title	Role	Notes
1987	Star Trek: The Next Generation	Post-atomic trial spectator	Episode: "Encounter at Farpoint"
1987	Star Trek: The Next Generation	Antican delegate	Episode: "Lonely Among Us"
1987	Star Trek: The Next Generation	Edo	Episode: "Justice"
1987	Star Trek: The Next Generation	Alien musket-wielding soldier	Episode: "Hide and Q"
1988	Star Trek: The Next Generation	Parisi Squares Player	Multiple episodes

=== Film ===
Year	Title	Role	Notes
1984	Company We Keep	The Hitchhiker	Debut
1988	Touch Me: It's Hot It's Tender	Boi-toy's man	
1988	Surge Men At Their Best	Brad	
1988	Ranch Hand	Felix	
1988	Offering	Don	
1988	Hot Hung and Hard	James	
1988	Crosswire	Casey	
1988	Come Clean	Ben	
1989	Undercover	Handsome Cop	
1989	Tim Lowe's Weekend Adventure	Brad	
1989	Switch Hitters 4	Brad	
1989	Stud Vision	Jamie	
1989	Seduction 1	Nick	
1989	Rooms	Brad	
1989	Rites Of Spring	Bill	
1989	Motorsexual	Waylon	
1989	Intruders	Miles	
1989	Hot Shots 28: Hot Pickups	Steve	
1989	Full Service	Bill	
1989	Flexx	Brad	
1989	Deep in Hot Water	Worker	
1989	Come Crazy	Eric	
1989	Bi-mistake	Brad	
1990	Superhunks 2	Handsome Hunk	
1990	Party Doll	Beautiful Guy	
1990	Manimals	Manny	
1990	Long Hard Ride	Niko	
1990	House Boys	Jack	
1990	He-Men	Carpenter	
1990	He-Devils	Sexy Guy	
1990	Great Slave Video Adventure	Brad	
1990	Bi Swingers	Handsome Man	
1991	Cum Shots 102	Bodybuilder	
1992	Man In Motion	Sexy Guy	
1992	In A Jock's Locker	Jock	
1992	Hot Pursuit	Tom	
1992	Dogs in Heat	Diego	
1992	Castro Commando	Mike	
1994	Cum Contest	Brain	
1995	Very Receptive	Trevor	
1995	Midnight Fantasies	Steven	
1997	That Old Whorehouse	Brad	
1997	Jocks	Jock	
1997	Jammin'	Brad	
1997	Crack Finder	Brad	
1997	Blond Bangers	Brad	
1997	Bare Boners	Brad	
1998	Youthful Offenders 18-25	Brad	
1998	New Meat 4	Brad	
1998	Iron Men of Porn 7	Brad	
1998	F-Train to Castro	Brad	
1999	Meat Market, Casting at the Campus	Brad	Director
1999	Casting at the Campus Meat Market	Brad	
2000	Anal Eager Boys	Brad	
2002	No One Sleeps	Verona Maid	Steve Casavant
2005	VCA's Gravest Hits	Brad	
2006	I Wanna Be Fellated	Brad	
2006	Fanny Packs	Brad	
2007	Blue Collar Boners	Brad	
2009	Best of Rex Chandler vs. Steve Hammond	Brad	
2011	Best of the 80s	Brad Phillips	
2020	How It Was Done Latin Style	Brad Phillips	
2021	Best of Manville Retro	Brad Phi	
			Posthumous release
