= Bobby Phillips =

Bobby Phillips may refer to:

- Bobby Phillips (American football) (born 1969), American football player
- Bobby Phillips (basketball) (born 1975), American basketball player
- Bobby Phillips (Georgia politician) (born 1946), American politician

== See also ==
- Robert Phillips (disambiguation), a disambiguation page for people named "Robert Phillips"
