= Gene Phillips =

Gene Phillips may refer to:

- Gene Phillips (basketball) (born 1948), American basketball player
- Gene Phillips (guitarist) (1915–1990), American guitarist
- Gene D. Phillips (1935–2016), American author
