= Rod Phillips =

Rod Phillips may refer to:

- Rod Phillips (broadcaster) (born 1941), Canadian radio sportscaster
- Rod Phillips (American football) (born 1952), former American football player with the Los Angeles Rams and St. Louis Cardinals.
- Rod Phillips (actor) (1960–1993), American actor, jeweler and model
- Rod Phillips (politician) (born 1965), Canadian politician

== See also ==
- Rodney Phillips (1942–1969), New Zealand chess player
