= James Madhlope Phillips =

South African artist

- Born: 11 December 1919
- Died: 22 October 1987 (aged 67)
- Citizenship: South Africa
- Occupation: Artist

James Philips was born in Sophiatown into a working-class family on 11 December 1919. His father died while he was still young and this had negative socio-economic repercussions for the family. The young Phillips was forced to work as a waiter and garden boy in order to pay for his education at Lovedale College. He later worked in the garment industry.

Phillips became involved in politics in 1940 when he was elected chairperson of the Garment Workers Union, number 2 branch of the Transvaal, a position he held until1953. That same year Phillips also joined the Communist Party of South Africa (CPSA). He became actively involved in the formation of the Transvaal Council of Non-European Unions in 1941 and was a co-founder of the Transvaal Council of Non-European Trade Unions, which later became the South African Congress of Trade Unions (SACTU). musician.
