= Brad Phillips (soccer) =

South African soccer player

Personal information
- Full name: Brad Sheldon Phillips
- Date of birth: 25 December 1987 (age 38)
- Place of birth: Johannesburg, South Africa
- Position: Left-back

Youth career
- SuperSport United
- Silver Stars
- Highlands Park
- Randburg AFC
- Bidvest Wits

Senior career*
Years	Team	Apps	(Gls)
2010–2013	Bidvest Wits	16	(1)
- * Club domestic league appearances and goals

Brad Phillips (born 25 December 1987) is a South African former soccer player who played as a left-back. He played for Bidvest Wits in the Premier Soccer League.

Phillips trained with the Wits youth team and in 2010 was promoted to the first team. He scored a goal on a free kick in the 2010 season opener against reigning champions SuperSport United.

By 2013, Phillips had fallen out of favour and his contract was not renewed. However, he continued training with the Wits reserves after making only a handful of first-team appearances.
