= Ernie Phillips (baseball) =

- Pitcher
- Batted: Unknown Threw: Unknown

Negro league baseball debut
- 1927, for the Birmingham Black Barons

Last appearance
- 1927, for the Birmingham Black Barons

Teams
- Birmingham Black Barons (1927)

Ernie Phillips was a professional baseball pitcher in the Negro leagues. He played with the Birmingham Black Barons in 1927.
