= James Phillips (English cricketer) =

English cricketer

James Phillips (26 September 1849 – 31 January 1905) was an English cricketer active from 1871 to 1888 who played for Sussex. He was born and died in Hastings. He appeared in 73 first-class matches as a righthanded batsman who scored 1,931 runs with a highest score of 89.
