= Reginald Phillips =

Reginald Phillips may refer to:

- Reginald Phillips (cricketer) (1897–1963), Welsh cricketer
- Reginald H. Phillips, member of the Illinois House of Representatives
- Reginald M. Phillips (1888–1977), English businessman, philanthropist and philatelist
- Reg Phillips (footballer, born 1900) (c. 1900 – 1924), English football full back (Brighton & Hove Albion)
- Reg Phillips (footballer, born 1921) (1921–1972), Welsh football forward (Crewe Alexandra)
- Reggie Phillips (Reginald Keith Phillips, born 1960), American football cornerback
