= Leon Phillips =

Leon Phillips may refer to:

- Leon C. Phillips (1890–1958), American attorney, state legislator and governor of Oklahoma
- Leon Phillips (chemist) (1935–2023), New Zealand physical chemist
- Leon Phillips (RAAF officer), officer in the Royal Australian Air Force

== See also ==
- Lion Philips (1794–1866), Dutch tobacco merchant
