= Scott Phillips =

Scott Phillips may refer to:

- Scott Phillips (musician) (born 1973), American musician and songwriter
- Scott Phillips (writer) (born 1961), American writer primarily of crime fiction in the noir tradition
- Scott Phillips (cricketer) (born 1994), Welsh cricketer
- Scott Phillips (Home and Away), fictional character on the Australian soap opera Home and Away

== See also ==
- Scottie Phillips (born 1997), American football player
