= Alfred Phillips =

Alfred or Alf Phillips may refer to:

- Alfred N. Phillips (1894–1970), U.S. Representative from Connecticut
- Alfred Phillips (diver) Sr. (1908–1994), Canadian diver and curler
- Alf Phillips Jr. (born c. 1938), Canadian curler, his son
- Alfred Phillips (Arena football), Utah Blaze player
