= Governor Phillips =

Governor Phillips may refer to:

- Arthur Phillip (1738–1814), 1st Governor of New South Wales
- Frederick Albert Phillips (1918–2011), Governor of Saint Christopher-Nevis-Anguilla from 1967 to 1969.
- J. G. Phillips (1911–1986), 2nd Governor of the Reserve Bank of Australia
- John Calhoun Phillips (1870–1943), 3rd Governor of Arizona
- Leon C. Phillips (1890–1958), 11th Governor of Oklahoma
- Nigel Phillips (born 1963), Governor of the Falkland Islands since 2017
- William Edward Phillips (born 1769), Acting Governor of the Prince of Wales Island on three occasions from 1810 to 1811

== See also ==
- Emanuel L. Philipp (1861–1925), 23rd Governor of Wisconsin
- Richard Philipps (1661–1750), Governor of Nova Scotia from 1717 to 1749
