= Chris Phillips (professor) =

British scientist

- Born: England
- Known for: Research on Quantum Optical Effects in Nanostructures, Heineken Uncertainty Principle, "Digistain" imaging for Cancer Diagnosis.
- Children: 2
- Awards: FInstP Institute of Physics (2005), Excellence in Teaching Award, Imperial College London (1997), Royal Society Innovation Award (2016), Cancer Research UK Pioneer Award (2019); President's Award for Outstanding Research Team (2017), FRSC Royal Society of Chemistry (2017); Innovate UK SMART Award (2022), Institute of Physics Business Startup Award 2022.

Chris Phillips is the former Dean of the Faculty of Natural Sciences and head of the Optoelectronics section at Imperial College London.

== Career ==
Phillips travelled in the developing world and worked for the BBC before taking up a faculty position in the Physics department of Imperial College London in 1985, at the age of 27. He was a visiting researcher at the Quantum Institute, University of California, Santa Barbara in 1997–98. He was elected a Fellow of the Institute of Physics in 2006, and served as Dean of the Faculty of Natural Sciences at Imperial College London from 2008 to 2011.

His research centres on the optical properties of semiconductor nanostructures. He is known for his work on electromagnetically induced transparency (EIT), a quantum optical effect whereby a crystal can be made to effectively disappear when it is illuminated by a sufficiently powerful invisible laser.

Most recently he is applying the techniques and devices developed over his research career to make ultra-efficient solar cells, and "Quantum Metamaterials." The latter can be used to make new types of optical components, e.g. "superlenses" that beat the normal limits to image sharpness imposed by the laws of diffraction.

In a departure from physics to medicine he is developing, and now clinically trialling, a new "Digistain" imaging technology. This enables the imaging of human tissue in a new way that reveals the chemical changes that accompany the onset of cancer. It promises to be a better way to detect and monitor the disease.

== Personal life ==
Phillips grew up in Cullercoats, a coastal town of population 10,000, in the North East of England, but his family moved south for work at an early age. He lives in West London and he has two grown-up children from a previous partner.

He enjoys adventure, music and travel. He lists his interests as Family, Cycling, distance rowing, hill-walking, catamaran racing, skiing and snowboarding.
