= Captain Phillips =

Captain Phillips may refer to:

- Richard Phillips (merchant mariner), captain of the MV Maersk Alabama taken hostage by Somali pirates in April 2009
  - Captain Phillips (film), a 2013 film about Captain Richard Phillips and the 2009 piracy incident
  - Captain Phillips (soundtrack), the 2013 soundtrack to the film of the same title
- Mark Phillips, former British Army captain and ex-husband of Anne, Princess Royal
