= Alexandra Phillips =

Alexandra Phillips may refer to:

- Alex Phillips (Green politician) (born 1985), British MEP and Mayor of Brighton
- Alex Phillips (TV presenter) (born 1983), British journalist and Brexit Party MEP
- Alexandra Phillips, Miss Germany in 1999
- Alexandra Hamilton, Duchess of Abercorn (1946–2018; née Phillips), British peer and philanthropist

== See also ==
- Alex Phillips (disambiguation)
- Alexander Phillips (disambiguation)
