= Pruvin Phillips =

Pruvin Phillips was an Anglican priest in the last decades of the 20th century, and the first of the 21st. He died in post as the Archdeacon of Grenada in 2005.
