= Trevor Phillips (disambiguation) =

Trevor Phillips (born 1953) is a British broadcaster and former politician.

Trevor Phillips may also refer to:

- Trevor J. Phillips (1927–2016), educational philosopher who wrote about transactionalism
- Trevor Phillips (footballer) (1952–2020), English retired professional footballer

== See also ==
- Trevor Philips, a character from video game Grand Theft Auto V
