= James Andrew Phillips =

Australian philosopher

James Phillips

Philosophical work
- Era: Contemporary philosophy
- Region: Western philosophy
- School: Continental
- Main interests: Aesthetics; Political Philosophy; Cinema Studies

James Andrew Phillips is an associate professor of philosophy at the University of New South Wales. He is known for his research on philosophy of art, the philosophy of film and performance, and Martin Heidegger's thought.

== Life ==
After receiving his MA in Comparative Literature and Critical Theory from Monash University, he studied as a Ph.D. student in philosophy in both Austria and Germany and finished his doctorate under Jeff Malpas at the University of Tasmania. Phillips has been a visiting fellow at the Institute of Advanced Studies in the Humanities (University of Edinburgh) and National Humanities Center in North Carolina.

== Bibliography ==
- Phillips JA, 2025, Busby Berkeley at Warner Bros.: Ideology and Utopia in the Hollywood Musical, Bloomsbury
- Phillips JA, and JR Severn, (eds.), 2021, Barrie Kosky's Transnational Theatres, Springer.
- Phillips JA, 2019, Sternberg and Dietrich: The Phenomenology of Spectacle, Oxford University Press
- Phillips JA, (ed.), 2008, Cinematic Thinking, Stanford University Press, Stanford
- Phillips JA, 2007, The Equivocation of Reason: Kleist reading Kant, Stanford University Press
- Phillips JA, 2005, Heidegger's Volk: Between National Socialism and Poetry, Stanford University Press
- Phillips JA, 2009, 'Beckett's Boredom', in Essays on Boredom and Modernity, edn. 1, Rodopi, Amsterdam

== See also ==
- Martin Heidegger and Nazism
