= Rowland Phillips =

Rowland Phillips may refer to:

- Rowland Phillips (judge) (1904-1976), Chief Justice of Jamaica, 1963–68
- Rowland Phillips (rugby) (born 1965), Welsh rugby union and rugby league player
- Rowland Phillips (tennis) (born 1994), Jamaican tennis player
