= Clyde Phillips =

Clyde Phillips may refer to:

- Clyde Phillips (horse trainer) (1891–1946), American racehorse trainer
- Clyde Phillips (writer) (born 1949), American writer and producer
- Clyde Phillips, “real” name of Suicide Squad villain Punch
