= Ronald Phillips =

Ronald Phillips may refer to:

- Ron Phillips (politician) (born 1949), Australian politician
- Ron Phillips (Australian footballer) (1921–2007), Australian rules footballer
- Ronald L. Phillips (1940–2023), American scientist and professor
- Ronnie Phillips (1947–2002), British footballer
- Ronald C. Phillips (1932–2005), American marine botanist and educator
- Ronald Phillips (murderer) (1973–2017), American murderer executed in 2017
- Ron Phillips (runner), winner of the 1972 4 × 880 yard relay at the NCAA Division I Indoor Track and Field Championships
