= Leslie Phillips (disambiguation) =

Leslie Phillips (1924–2022) was an English actor.

Leslie Phillips or Lesley Phillips may also refer to:

- Les Phillips (born 1963), English football midfielder
- Lesley Phillips, Western Australian Superintendent of Technical Education in the 1940s
- Leslie Phillips (cricketer) (1899–1979), English cricketer
- Leslie Gordon Phillips (1892–1966), British Army officer
- Sam Phillips (musician, born 1962) (born 1962), American singer-songwriter, born Leslie Ann Phillips
