= Sarah Phillips =

Sarah Phillips may refer to:

- Sarah Phillips (cyclist) (born 1967), British cyclist
- Sarah Phillips (fashion designer), American fashion designer
- Sarah Phillips (novel), 1984 book by Andrea Lee
- Sarah Phillips (singer) (born 1993), British singer
