= Bruce Phillips =

Bruce Phillips may refer to:

- Bruce Phillips (footballer) (1929–2014), Australian rules footballer
- Bruce Phillips (journalist) (1930–2014), Canadian television journalist
- Utah Phillips (Bruce Duncan Phillips, 1935–2008), American labor organizer, folk singer, storyteller and poet
