= Norman Phillips =

Norman Phillips may refer to:

- Norman Phillips (Coronation Street), a character on the soap opera Coronation Street
- Norman A. Phillips (1923–2019), American meteorologist
