= Reuben Phillips =

Reuben Phillips may refer to:

- Reuben Phillips (musician) (died 1974), American jazz saxophonist
- Reuben Jasper Phillips (1874–1936), American marine
