= Aaron Phillips =

Aaron Phillips may refer to:

- Aaron Phillips (athlete) born 1965), Venezuelan sprinter
- Aaron Phillips (fighter) (born 1989), American martial artist
- Aaron Phillips (footballer) (born 1993), English footballer

== See also ==
- Erin Phillips (born 1985), American basketball player
- Aaron Phillip Hart (1724–1800), Canadian businessman
