= Lefty Phillips (pitcher) =

American baseball player (1917–1962)

- Pitcher
- Born: May 24, 1917; Nashville, Tennessee, U.S.
- Died: October 11, 1962 (aged 45); Nashville, Tennessee, U.S.
- Batted: Unknown Threw: Left

Negro league baseball debut
- 1939, for the Baltimore Elite Giants

Last appearance
- 1941, for the Baltimore Elite Giants

Teams
- Baltimore Elite Giants (1939-1940)

John William "Lefty" Phillips (May 24, 1917 – October 11, 1962) was an American professional baseball pitcher in the Negro leagues. He played with the Baltimore Elite Giants from 1939 to 1941. His father, Hooty Phillips, also played in the Negro leagues.
