= Owen Phillips =

Owen Phillips may refer to:

- Owen Phillips (priest) (1826–1897), Dean of St David's
- Owen Phillips (rugby league), Welsh rugby league footballer who played in the 1950s
- Owen Phillips (sport shooter) (1906–?), Belizean sports shooter
- Owen Hood Phillips (1907–1986), legal writer
- Owen Martin Phillips (1930–2010), American physical oceanographer and geophysicist
- Owen Phillips (general) (1882–1966), officer in the Australian Army
