= Cheryl Phillips (journalist) =

American data journalist

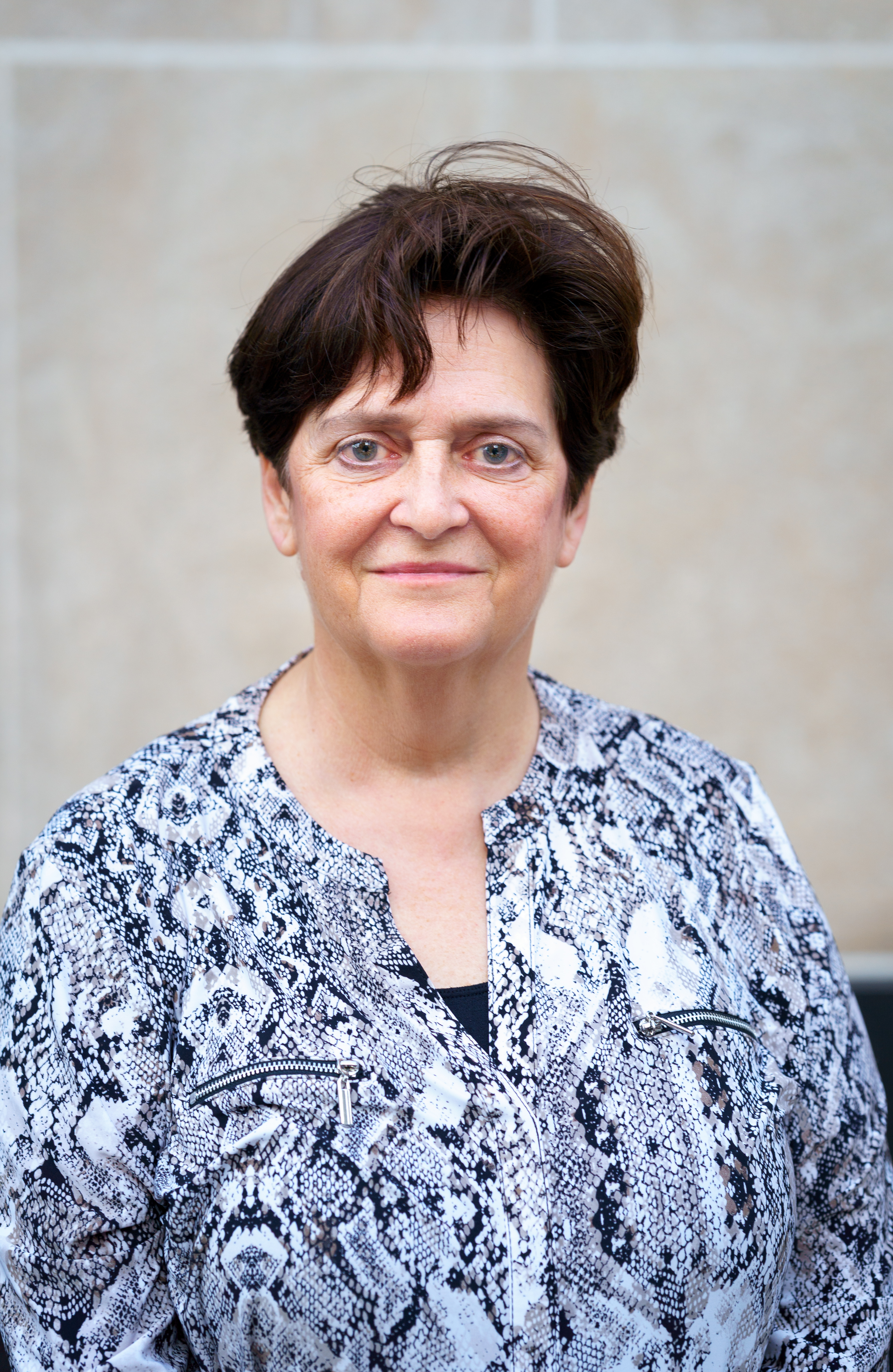
Journalist and Stanford professor Cheryl Phillips at Hacks/Hackers AI x Journalism Summit in Baltimore in 2025

Cheryl Phillips is an American data journalist and professor. As of 2014, she has taught data journalism at Stanford University and founded both its Computational Journalism Lab and its Big Local News initiative. As of 2022, she has also served as the director of Stanford's Computational Policy Lab.

== Career ==
=== Seattle Times ===
Between 2002 and 2014, Phillips worked for the Seattle Times. In 2004, Phillips was part of a team that won the Sigma Delta Chi Award for their reporting on the TSA. Phillips was also on the team that gathered and organized the data for the Seattle Times when they were awarded two Pulitzer Prizes for Breaking News Reporting: one in 2010, for a story that covered the shooting deaths of four police officers, and the other in 2015, for their detailed coverage of the Steelhead Haven neighborhood landslide. While working at the Seattle Times, Phillips was the data innovation editor at the time and contributed to the data gathering and data visualization that enhanced both of those stories.

=== Stanford ===
Since 2014, Phillips has been teaching data journalism in Stanford University's Department of Communication and Journalism, where she co-founded the Stanford Computational Journalism Lab and serves as the Hearst Professional-in-Residence. In 2022, Cheryl Phillips became the Stanford Computational Policy Lab's director.

=== Big Local News ===
Phillips founded the Big Local News initiative and serves as its co-director. She had initially pitched the idea for it during a job talk at Stanford in 2014. The initiative collects data for journalism purposes and additionally develops tools, such as Data Talk and Audit Watch, in order to crawl public information and help journalists with stories regarding government accountability. Some tools are powered by artificial intelligence, specifically natural language processing, in order to sift through large data sets from the government.

Big Local News has partnered with The New York Times, received support from the Knight Foundation, and provided courses for students at Stanford. In 2024, Big Local News' journalists were part of two finalists for the Pulitzer Prizes.
