= Howard Phillips (cricketer) =

English cricketer

Personal information
- Full name: Howard William Phillips
- Born: 20 April 1872; St Helens, Isle of Wight, England
- Died: 17 March 1960 (aged 87); East London, Cape Province, South Africa
- Batting: Right-handed
- Bowling: Unknown

Domestic team information
- Years: Team
- 1899–1902: Hampshire
- 1906/07–1913/14: Border

Career statistics
Competition	First-class
Matches	17
Runs scored	267
Batting average	9.51
100s/50s	–/–
Top score	47
Balls bowled	292
Wickets	2
Bowling average	81.00
5 wickets in innings	–
10 wickets in match	–
Best bowling	1/10
Catches/stumpings	12/–
- Source: Cricinfo, 24 January 2010

Howard William Phillips (20 April 1872 — 17 March 1960) was an English first-class cricketer.

Phillips was born on the Isle of Wight at St Helens in April 1872. He made his debut in first-class cricket for Hampshire against Leicestershire at Bournemouth in the 1898 County Championship. He played irregularly for Hampshire until 1902, making five appearances. In these, he scored 53 runs with a highest score of 40. Shortly after his final match for Hampshire, Phillips emigrated to South Africa.

There he played first-class cricket for Border, making his debut against Transvaal at King William's Town in March 1907. He played for Border until 1913, making twelve first-class appearances, eight of which came in the Currie Cup. For Border, he scored 223 runs at an average of 11.15, with a highest score of 47. Phillips died in South Africa at East London in March 1960.
