= Jonny Phillips =

Jonny Phillips may refer to:

- Jonny Phillips (actor) (1963), English actor
- Jonny Phillips (musician) (1971), English musician
