= Donald Phillips =

Don or Donald Phillips may refer to:

- Donald Phillips (bishop) (died 2003), Canadian Anglican bishop
- Donald "Curly" Phillips (1884–1945), Canadian guide, outfitter, entrepreneur, and explorer
- Donald T. Phillips (born 1952), nonfiction writer
- Don Phillips (casting director) (1940–2021), American casting director and film producer
- Don Phillips (American politician) (born 1951), American politician
- Don Phillips (Canadian politician) (1929–2016), Canadian politician
- Don L. Phillips, American football and basketball coach

== See also ==
- Dom Phillips (1964–2022), British journalist
