= Jeff Phillips =

Jeff Phillips may refer to:

- Jeff Phillips (singer) (born 1948), Australian TV personality, musical theatre actor and pop singer
- Jeff Daniel Phillips, actor from the GEICO "caveman" commercials
- Jeff Phillips (trainer) (born 1968), American fitness trainer and actor
- Jeff "Big Juicy Papa" Phillips, saxophone player from the band Johnny and the Moon
- Jeff Phillips (skateboarder) (1963–1993), American professional skateboarder
- Jeff Phillips (sprinter), American sprinter and champion at the 1982 USA Outdoor Track and Field Championships
- Jeff Phillips, financial advisor and candidate for the U.S. House of Representatives in North Carolina in 2010
