= Martin Phillips =

Martin Phillips may refer to:

- Martin Phillips (footballer) (born 1976), English footballer
- Martin Phillips (darts player) (born 1960), Welsh darts player
- Martin Phillipps (1963–2024), New Zealand musician with The Chills
