= Derek Phillips =

Derek Phillips may refer to:

- Derek Phillips (footballer, born 1975), American-born Trinidad and Tobago footballer
- Derek Phillips (New Zealand footballer), former football goalkeeper who represented New Zealand
- Derek Phillips (actor) (born 1976), American stage, screen, and television actor
- Derek Phillips (c. 1941–2024), English co-founder of Demelza Hospice Care for Children
