= Harold Phillips =

Harold Phillips may refer to:

- Lord Woodbine (Harold Adolphus Phillips) (1929–2000), Trinidadian calypsonian and music promoter
- Harold Phillips (British Army officer) (1909–1980)
- Harold H. Phillips (1928–1999), Ghanaian doctor and academic
- Harold Meyer Phillips (1874–1967), American chess player
