= Arthur Callow =

American politician

Arthur L. Callow
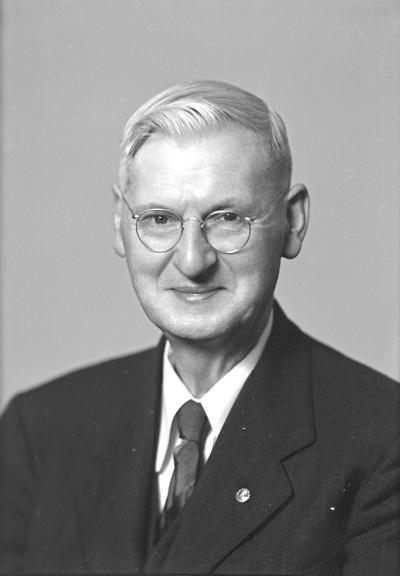
- Callow in 1947

Member of the Washington House of Representatives for the 21st district
- In office 1941–1951

Personal details
- Born: May 1869 Milwaukee, Wisconsin, United States
- Died: November 8, 1955 (aged 86) Elma, Washington, United States
- Party: Democratic

Arthur Lewis Callow (May 1869 – November 8, 1955) was an American politician in the state of Washington. He served in the Washington House of Representatives from 1941 to 1951.
