= Walter Phillips =

Walter Phillips may refer to:

- Walter J. Phillips (1884–1963), American artist
- Walter P. Phillips (1846–1920), American inventor
- Walter Alison Phillips (1864–1950), British historian
- Walter Phillips (cricketer) (1881–1948), English cricketer
- Walter Phillips (bowls), English lawn bowler
- Walter Shelley Phillips, self-educated and self-trained naturalist, artist and author
- Wally Phillips (1925–2008), American radio personality
- Wal Phillips (1908–1998), English motorcycle speedway rider

== See also ==
- Walter Phillips Gallery, Banff, Alberta
