= Simon Phillips =

Simon Phillips may refer to:

- Simon Phillips (drummer) (born 1957), English jazz, pop and rock drummer and producer
- Simon Phillips (actor) (born 1980), British actor and film producer
- Simon Phillips (director) (born 1958), New Zealand-Australian stage director
- Simon Phillips (footballer) (born 1987), Australian rules footballer
- Simon Phillips (rugby league) (born 1983), Australian rugby league footballer
