= Nikki Phillips =

Nikki Phillips my refer to:

- Nikki Phillips (model) (born 1983), New Zealand model
- Nikki Phillips (soccer) (born 1987), Polish-American footballer
