= Linda Gilbert Saucier =

American mathematician and textbook author

Linda Gilbert Saucier (née Phillips; born 1948) is an American mathematician and textbook author, a distinguished professor emerita of mathematics and computer science at the University of South Carolina Upstate.

== Education and career ==
Linda Phillips was the daughter of Rudd George Phillips, an education specialist for the United States Air Force. She grew up in Gulfport, Mississippi, and earned B.S., M.S., and Ph.D. degrees from Louisiana Tech University in 1970, 1972, and 1977 respectively. Her dissertation applied linear algebra to epidemiology; it was titled An application of the Jordan canonical form to the epidemic problem. She also became a faculty member at Louisiana Tech with her husband and co-author, Jimmie Gilbert, who died in 2005. She retired from the University of South Carolina Upstate and was given the distinguished professor emerita title in 2011.

== Books ==
Under the name Linda Gilbert, she became the author of "more than 37 mathematics textbooks" including Elements of Modern Algebra, College Algebra, College Trigonometry, Precalculus, and Matrix Theory.
