= Dan Phillips (builder) =

American designer and builder from Texas

Dan Phillips was an American designer and builder from Texas. He was the founder and face of Phoenix Commotion, a construction company established in 1997. Phoenix Commotion focuses on designing Eco-friendly homes for low-income individuals and families such as struggling artists and single mothers. The company’s goals include reducing landfill burdens through the use of excess and recyclable materials; providing low-income housing through selection of cheap materials and labor; and allowing opportunities for the unemployed by training unskilled workers.

As a for-profit organization, Phoenix Commotion hopes to show the financial and ethical benefits of sustainable building and challenge current standard building codes and building methods, which favor the use of raw materials.

== Background ==
Phillips grew up in Littleton, Colorado. He was the youngest of three children to George Phillips, a former lumber company owner and Phoebe, a homemaker (died in 1979). Phillips undertook a master's degree in dance at Sam Houston State University. In 1969 Dan Phillips married wife Marsha Phillips, a formal high school teacher, they have two children Ian and Phoebe.

Previously Phillips worked as an intelligence officer in the U.S. Army, and as a college dance instructor (during the 1970s), an antiques dealer/restorer (1983) and an organized cryptogram puzzle maker.

In 1997 Phillips and his wife mortgaged their family home to establish the construction company Phoenix Commotion, based from Huntsville, Texas. Phillips is a self-taught carpenter, electrician and plumber and has no formal training in design or construction.

Phillips died on December 21, 2021 after a "long battle with cancer".

== Phoenix Commotion ==
As of 2009 the company had constructed 14 homes in Huntsville, Texas. They ensure all homes meet local building codes and are approved by qualified engineers, electricians and plumbers.

The staffs include unskilled laborers who are trained on site and encouraged to apply for higher paying jobs once sound skills are acquired. The home’s eventual residents also provide additional labor in the majority of projects as a way of saving costs during construction and post construction, as skills can assist in the future maintenance of the home.

Home designs are typically smaller home projects (240 square-feet per person), with preferred minimal landscaping techniques such as xeriscaping and simplified interior features such as no carpet, vinyl, dishwasher, garbage disposer, trash compactor, separate dining room and large bedrooms. All features of the home opt for environmental alternatives such as tank-less water heaters and the toilet and washing machine being fed with rainwater from a cistern.

Phoenix commotion is partnered with a certified non-profit organization called Living Paradigm, Houston. Living Paradigm with The Phoenix Fund, assists homesteaders financially start building their homes by serving as interim financing for land, building permits, construction materials that must be purchased new, such as structural lumber, plumbing and electrical supplies.

Payments on homes constructed range from $99 to $300 a month. In numerous cases homeowners have been unable to sustain payments, leading to the homes being lost to foreclosure and resold. The majority of potential buyers include middle-class individuals who value the homes unique design and energy efficiency.

== Materials and Design Strategies ==
Phoenix Commotion homes are built from 70 - 80% of materials that have been recovered from other construction projects. The home's design specifics depend on the materials and resources available at the time.

Phillips used discipline, orderly design and the concept of repetition to create pattern and unity to resolve designs and avoid a ‘bodged’ aesthetic. Phillips also used building methods from third world countries as inspiration for his projects.

Huntsville City Officials supported the local company in 2004 by opening Trash into Plowshares (TIP), a drop off warehouse for surplus materials from builders, demolition crews and building product manufactures. The arrangement is tax deductible for contributors as supplies are used exclusively by charitable groups or for low-income housing. Other local towns including Houston and Indianapolis are setting up similar systems and engaging in discussions to learn new recycling techniques and applications.

Recycled materials that have been used in previous projects include:

- Plywood
- Mismatched bricks
- Ceramic Tiles
- Shattered mirrors
- Bottle butts
- Wine corks
- Old DVDs
- Bones
- License plates
- Crystal platters
- Cans

== Projects ==
=== Victorian House ===
Victorian House was the first house built by Phoenix Commotion. The home is inspired by the "Painted Ladies" of San Francisco. Features salvaged materials such as the double front door and the entire kitchen, including appliances. Some features in the home are constructed from organic materials, for example, hickory nuts, chicken eggs functioning as architectural buttons on the corbel for the turret, and a bathtub made from recycled wood.

=== Tree House ===
The Tree House is built in a Bois d'arc tree thirty-five feet above Huntsville's Town Creek in Huntsville, Texas. The tree house space has a multipurpose function. It was designed with many proposals in mind, being an attachment to the main house, a rent-able studio for artists. The ceiling is covered with discarded frame samples from a frame shop. It includes high electrical capacity for sculptors, mirrors for dancers, windows bringing in natural light for painters, and a sink.

=== Budweiser House ===
The construction of the Budweiser House was based on the American ‘Budweiser Beer’. The external facade of the house has been produced based on the color scheme and the pattern of the beer bottle. The bathroom walls encapsulate a circular design stemming from the bathtub, just like bubbles that surface in a beer, and the tap handles for the bath are made from beer taps.

== Media ==
Phoenix Commotion has featured internationally on programs such as TED Talks International, Associated French Press, Japan – Muri, Italy Home Wellness, Germany – TV, Ireland – The Eco Ezine and China Beijing News.

== See also ==
- John Dewey
- Friedrich Nietzsche
- Ecological restoration
- Ecological design
- Sustainable design
- Vernacular architecture
- Tiny house movement
- Alternative housing

== External Reading ==
- John Dewey. 1959. Art as Experience. Capricorn Books, New York
- Friedrich Nietzsche.1883. The Birth of Tragedy. Penguin Classics Books (Penguin edition 1993)
- Larry Haun. 2008. Habitat for Humanity: How to Build a House, Revised and Updated. The Taunton Press Inc, Newtown CT
- Ferrell, Jeff. 2005. Salvage Operation: A study of Social Criminology. NYU Press, New York
