= Wendell Phillips (disambiguation) =

Wendell Phillips (1811–1884) was an American abolitionist.

Wendell Phillips may also refer to:

- Wendell Phillips (archaeologist) (1921–1975), American archaeologist
- Wendell H. Phillips (1934–1999), American politician
