= Anna Phillips =

Anna Phillips may refer to:

- Anna Phillips (Seventh-day Adventist) (1865–1926), prophetess
- Anna Grace Phillips, known as Anna Slater (fl. 2026), British chemist
- Anna J. Phillips, American zoologist and curator
- Anna Lise Phillips, Australian actress
- Anna Maria Crouch (1763–1805), née Phillips, English singer and stage actress

== See also ==
- Anne Phillips (disambiguation), multiple people
