= Lockwood Phillips =

Lockwood Phillips (born March 18, 1948) hosts a talk radio program called "Viewpoints" on station WTKF 107.1 FM, located in Morehead City, North Carolina and broadcasting throughout Eastern North Carolina.

He is co-owner and General Manager of The Carteret County News-Times, a community newspaper based in Morehead City, along with his wife, Nikki Phillips, under the banner of Carteret Publishing Company, which is also affiliated with Tideland News out of Swansboro.

Phillips is also a former President of the National Newspaper Association (NNA).

== Guests ==
Phillips' guests on Viewpoints have included: Pat Buchanan, Lt. General Michael DeLong, Newt Gingrich, Oliver North, Donald Rumsfeld, Herman Cain, Tucker Carlson, and Joe Giglio.
