= Peter Phillips (disambiguation) =

Peter Phillips (born 1977) is the son of Anne, Princess Royal of the United Kingdom.

Peter Phillips, Philips, or Philipps may also refer to:

== Arts and entertainment ==
- Peter Philips (c. 1560–1628), English composer
- Peter Phillips (author) (1920–2012), British science fiction writer
- Peter Phillips (artist) (1939–2025), English artist
- Peter Phillips (conductor) (born 1953), British choral conductor
- Pete Rock or Peter Phillips (born 1970), American music producer and rapper
- Peter Philips (make-up artist) (fl. 1993–2014), Belgian make-up artist and creative director for Chanel

== Law and politics ==
- Peter Phillips (judge) (1731–1807), American jurist; justice of the Rhode Island Supreme Court
- Peter Philipps (1835–1917), American politician
- Peter Philips (politician) (1927–2009), Australian politician
- Peter Phillips (Jamaican politician) (born 1949), Jamaican politician; president of the People's National Party
- Peter Phillips (Barbadian politician), Barbadian politician

== Others ==
- Peter Phillips (athlete) (born 1942), Australian shot putter and weightlifter
- Peter Phillips (economist) (born 1948), British economist
- Peter Phillips (rugby league) (born 1969), Australian rugby league player
- Peter Phillips (businessman) (born 1962), British business executive at Cambridge University Press & Assessment
