= Hooty Phillips =

American baseball player

- Second baseman
- Batted: Right Threw: Right

Negro league baseball debut
- 1922, for the Nashville Elite Giants

Last appearance
- 1923, for the Milwaukee Bears

Teams
- Nashville Elite Giants (1922); Detroit Stars (1923); Milwaukee Bears (1923)

Hooty Phillips was a professional baseball second baseman in the Negro leagues. He played with the Nashville Elite Giants in 1922, and with the Detroit Stars and Milwaukee Bears in 1923. His son, Lefty Phillips, also played in the Negro leagues.
