= Hugh Phillips (cricketer) =

English cricketer (1929–2018)

Personal information
- Full name: Hugh Raymond Phillips
- Born: 18 September 1929; Kuala Lumpur, British Malaya
- Died: 2018
- Batting: Right-handed

Domestic team information
- Years: Team
- 1951: Warwickshire

Career statistics
| Competition | First-class |
|---|---|
| Matches | 1 |
| Runs scored | 3 |
| Batting average | 3.00 |
| 100s/50s | –/– |
| Top score | 3 |
| Balls bowled | – |
| Wickets | – |
| Bowling average | – |
| 5 wickets in innings | – |
| 10 wickets in match | – |
| Best bowling | – |
| Catches/stumpings | –/– |
- Source: Cricinfo, 10 May 2012

Hugh Raymond Phillips (8 April 1929 – 2018) was an English cricketer. Phillips was a right-handed batsman. He was born at Kuala Lumpur in what was then British Malaya, now Malaysia.

Phillips made a single first-class appearance for Warwickshire against Scotland at Edgbaston in 1951. Scotland won the toss and elected to bat in their first-innings, making 359 all out. In response, Warwickshire made 332 all out, with Phillips scoring 3 runs at number five, before he was dismissed by Samuel Thomson. This was his only first-class batting innings, with the match being declared a draw.

He died in 2018 in New Zealand.
