= Ricey Phillips =

South African cricketer

Personal information
- Full name: Ralph Roland Phillips
- Born: 28 February 1920; East London, Cape Province, South Africa
- Died: 26 November 2008 (aged 88); Claremont, Cape Town, Western Cape, South Africa
- Batting: Left-handed
- Bowling: Right-arm leg-spin
- Relatives: John Phillips (brother)

Domestic team information
- Years: Team
- 1939–40 to 1956–57: Border

Career statistics
Competition	First-class
Matches	37
Runs scored	2093
Batting average	32.20
100s/50s	2/14
Top score	139
Balls bowled	1023
Wickets	24
Bowling average	28.50
5 wickets in innings	2
10 wickets in match	0
Best bowling	6/36
Catches/stumpings	21/–
- Source: Cricinfo, 10 May 2020

Ralph Roland "Ricey" Phillips (28 February 1920 – 26 November 2008) was a South African cricketer who played first-class cricket for Border from 1939 to 1957.

== Life and career ==
Ricey Phillips was born in East London. His nickname came from a childhood fondness for rice pudding. His older brother John played for Border in the 1930s before Ricey's career began.

Ricey Phillips was an opening batsman and occasional leg-spin bowler. He began his first-class career aged 19 in 1939–40, the last South African season before the Second World War intervened. In his fifth match, the last of the season, he was asked to bowl for the first time. He promptly took a hat-trick with the third, fourth and fifth balls of his first over, and finished the innings with 5 for 38 from 40 deliveries.

During the war Phillips served with the South African forces in North Africa and was captured at Tobruk. While being transported as a prisoner-of-war to Germany across Italy he escaped and managed to get to England. He played some war-time cricket there before returning to South Africa, where he re-enlisted.

When Phillips resumed his first-class career in 1946–47 he scored 93, 33, 62, 53 not out, 139 and 27 in his first three matches. He finished the summer with 531 runs at an average of 59.00 and was widely considered to be unlucky to miss out on the 1947 tour of England.

His form was more moderate thereafter, although he was included in the Cape Province team that played against the touring MCC in 1948–49, a virtual Test trial. He had one further bowling success, when he took the last six North Eastern Transvaal wickets to fall in a Currie Cup match in 1950–51, finishing with figures of 6 for 36.

Phillips was also a good rugby union player and was chosen to play in Springbok trials in 1949.
