= Sean Phillips (disambiguation) =

Sean Phillips (born 1965) is a comic books artist.

Sean, Shawn or Shaun Phil(l)ips may also refer to:

- Sean Phillips (born 1965), voice over actor
- Sean Phillips (cricketer) (born 1980), South African cricketer
- Sean Phillips (visual effects artist), special effects artist

== Others ==
- Shawn Phillips, musician
- Shaun Phillips, American football player
