= Percy Phillips =

Percy Phillips may refer to:

- Percy Phillips (rugby union) (1869–1947), Welsh rugby union player
- Percy Francis Phillips (1896–1984), sound engineer and owner of Phillips' Sound Recording Services
- Percy W. Phillips (1892–1969), judge of the United States Tax Court

== See also ==
- Edwin Percy Phillips (1884–1967), South African botanist and taxonomist
