= Anne Phillips =

Anne or Ann Phillips may refer to:

- Ann C. Phillips, American Navy admiral and government official
- Anne Phillips (geologist) (1803–1862), English geologist
- Anne Phillips (political theorist) (born 1950), British political theorist
- Anne Phillips (singer), American singer
- Ann Terry Greene Phillips, spouse of American abolitionist Wendell Phillips

== See also ==
- Anne, Princess Royal (born 1950), member of the British royal family formerly married to Mark Phillips
- Anna Phillips (disambiguation), multiple people
- Ann Howard (golfer) (née Phillips, born 1934), English golfer
