= Douglas Phillips (designer) =

Artist

Douglas Phillips (1922–1995) was an American stained glass artist who founded the Phillips Stained Glass Studio in 1952. He is believed to be the only African American artist to run his own stained glass studio between the years of 1952 and 1995.

== Early life and education ==
Phillips was born in Farrell, Pennsylvania in 1922. He studied fine art in high school at John Huntington Polytechnic Institute and took classes at the Institute of Art in Cleveland. During World War II, Phillips served in the United States Army for three years, twenty-six months of which were spent in the Pacific theater. He worked as a commercial artist a few years before going to Syracuse University for his BFA, which he received in 1950. He majored in Portrait and Illustration.

== Career ==
After graduating from Syracuse, Phillips joined the Ecclesiastical Arts Studio run by Rudolf Sandon as a designer and painter of stained glass. Although he had not studied to be a stained glass artist, he learned various techniques while working at this studio.

In 1952 he founded his own studio with the support and technical assistance of old-time Cleveland stained glass master Louis Buser. By the mid-1950s, Phillips Stained Glass Studio had a reputation for museum quality restoration and was receiving a large number of commissions for religious buildings within Ohio and in other cities throughout the United States.

Phillips also worked as a designer for General Electric. He created the first lighting systems for interior, windowless stained glass installations and designed many of General Electric's famous Nela Park holiday lighting displays.

Phillips was a member of the Illuminating Engineering Society of North America and an active member of the Stained Glass Association of America, contributing the chapter on Lighting Stained Glass to the SGAA's Reference and Technical Manual.

In addition to completing hundreds of commissioned pieces for churches, for many years Phillips also exhibited his stained glass works at the Cleveland Museum of Art's annual exhibition of work by Cleveland artists and craftsmen. In 1952 Phillips earned the first prize in the glass category. In 1957 his work entitled "Ichthus" shared the prize in glass with another artist, Edris Eckhardt.

Phillips' career was featured in Ebony magazine in 1971.

== Selected works ==
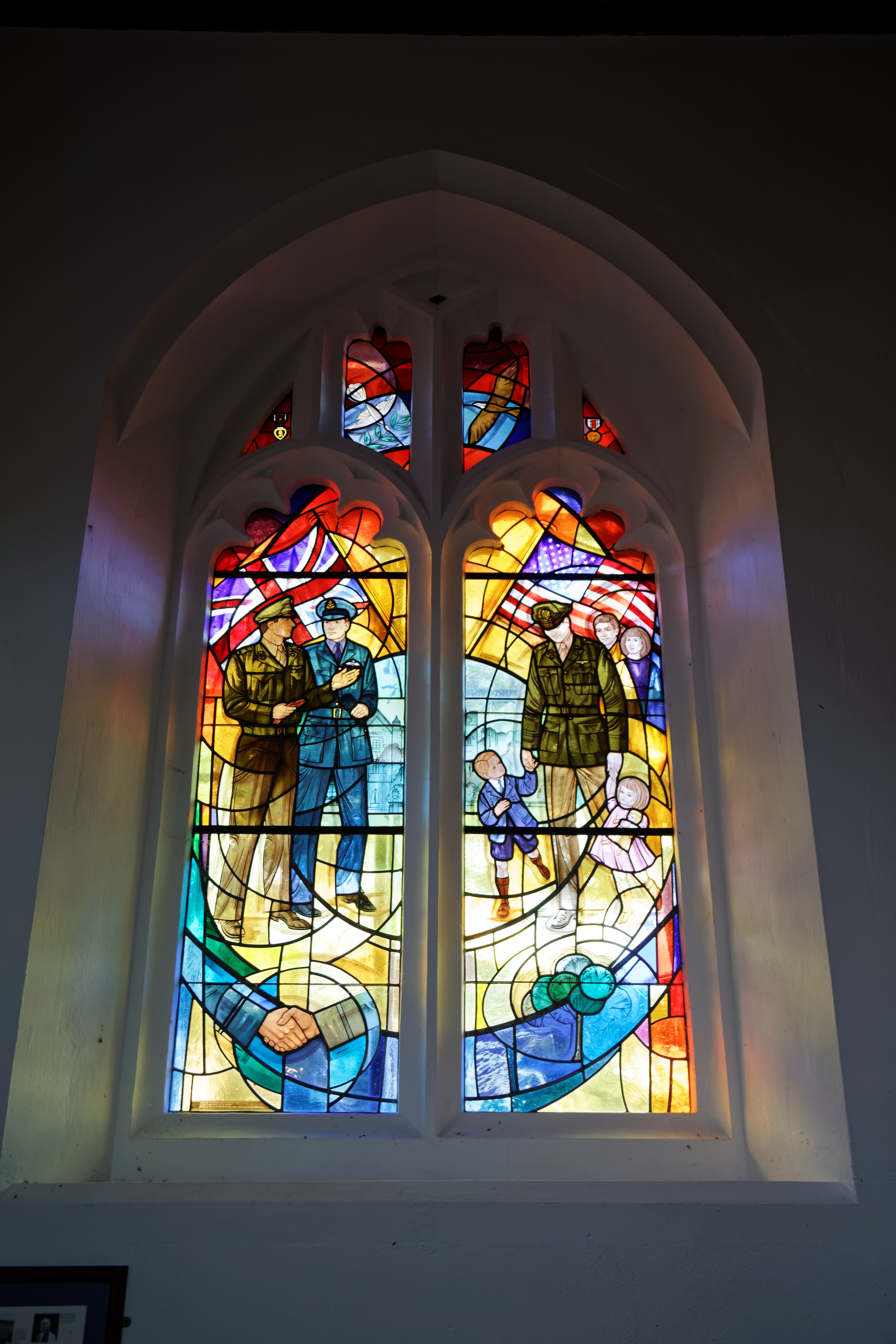
Church of St Mary Little Easton Essex England Crusader Chapel window

- St. Thomas Episcopal Church - Berea, Ohio
- The Church of the Covenant - Cleveland, Ohio
- Barberton Citizens Hospital Chapel - Cleveland, Ohio
- Lakewood Presbyterian Church - Cleveland, Ohio
- Greater Abyssinia Baptist Church - Cleveland, OH
- Austin Memorial Chapel of Windermere Methodist Church - East Cleveland, Ohio
- Fairlawn Lutheran Church - Fairlawn, Ohio
- Agudath B’nai Israel Synagogue - Lorain, Ohio
- First Church Congregational - Painesville, Ohio
- St. William Catholic Church - Warren, Ohio
- Lutheran Home - Westlake, Ohio
- St. Joseph Riverside Hospital - Warren, Ohio (abandoned)
- Bethel AME Church - Little Rock, Arkansas
- Trinity United Church of Christ - Chicago, Illinois
- Newburg United Methodist Church - Livonia, Michigan
- Holy Trinity Lutheran Church - Sharon, Pennsylvania
- Mount Zion Baptist Church - Seattle, Washington
- Grace Evangelical Lutheran Church - West Carrollton, Ohio
- Crusader Chapel of the Church of St Mary the Virgin - Little Easton, Essex, England
