= Van Phillips =

Van Phillips may refer to:

- Van Phillips (golfer) (born 1972), English golfer
- Van Phillips (inventor) (born 1954), American inventor of prosthetics
- Van Phillips (composer), jazz composer, bandleader and musician
