= Clarence Phillips =

Clarence Phillips may refer to:

- Red Phillips (baseball) (Clarence Lemuel Phillips, 1908–1988), American baseball pitcher
- Clarence W. Phillips (1925–2012), American lawyer and politician
- Bud Phillips (Clarence Edward Phillips, born 1950), American politician
- Clarence Coles Phillips (1880–1927), American artist and illustrator
