= Grace Kelley =

American politician

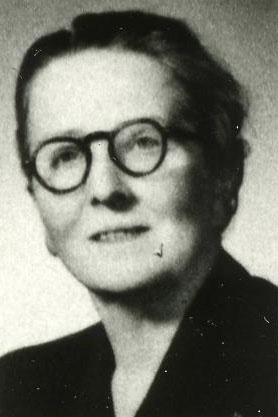
- Kelley in 1949

Member of the Washington House of Representatives for the 21st district
- In office 1949–1951

Personal details
- Born: 1894 Niagara, North Dakota, United States
- Died: Unknown
- Party: Democratic

Grace Kelley (born 1894, date of death missing) was an American politician in the state of Washington. She served in the Washington House of Representatives from 1949 to 1951 for district 21.
