= Stu Phillips =

Stu Phillips may refer to:

- Stu Phillips (composer) (born 1929), American film music composer
- Stu Phillips (country singer) (1933–2025), Canadian-born country music performer and Grand Ole Opry member

== See also ==
- Stewart Phillips, English footballer
