= Roger Phillips =

Roger Phillips may refer to:

- Roger Phillips (photographer) (1932–2021), plant photographer and botanist
- Roger J. Phillips (1940–2020), American geophysicist and planetary scientist
- Roger Phillips (Happy Days), a character in TV comedy drama Happy Days

== See also ==
- Roger Phillips Graham (1909–1966), American science fiction writer
