= Paul Phillips =

Paul Phillips may refer to:

- Paul Phillips (baseball) (born 1977), Major League Baseball catcher
- Paul Phillips (guitarist) (born 1975), lead guitarist for the band Puddle of Mudd
- Paul Phillips (singer), English singer-songwriter
- Paul Phillips (poker player) (born 1972), American software engineer, entrepreneur and poker player
- Paul Phillips (conductor) (born 1956), American conductor, composer and music scholar
- Paul Phillips (bodhran) (1959–2007), Irish bodhrán player and teacher
- Paul D. Phillips (1918–2023), United States Army general and government official
- Paul L. Phillips (1904–1975), American labor union leader
- Paul Aldunate Phillips (1909–?), Chilean lawyer, politician, and businessman
- Paul Phillips, pilot of DHL Flight 611, which crashed into Bashkirian Airlines Flight 2937 in mid-air
