= Alex Phillips (poet) =

American poet

Alex Phillips is an assistant professor and director of assessment and curriculum development at Commonwealth College, the honors college at the University of Massachusetts. His poetry and translations have appeared in journals such as Poetry, Open City, and jubilat, and in Ted Kooser's newspaper column "American Life in Poetry". His book-length poem, Crash Dome, is published by Factory Hollow Press. Crash Dome was voted one of the top 20 poetry books of 2010 by readers of The Believer.
