= Caroline Phillips =

Caroline Phillips may refer to:

- Caroline Phillips (journalist) (1874–1956), Scottish feminist, suffragette and journalist
- Caroline Phillips (archaeologist), New Zealand archaeologist
- Caroline Phillips (visual artist), Australian visual artist
- Caroline Phillips, British journalist (1959-)
