= Ryan Phillips (disambiguation) =

Ryan Phillips (born 1982) is a Canadian football player.

Ryan Phillips may also refer to:

- Ryan Phillips (American football) (born 1974), American football player
- Ryan Phillips, musician in Story of the Year
