= Len Phillips (disambiguation) =

Len Phillips (1922–2011) was an English footballer

Len Phillips may also refer to:

- Len Phillips (footballer, born 1890) (1890–1968), Australian rules footballer for St Kilda and Essendon
- Len Phillips (footballer, born 1891) (1891–1978), Australian rules footballer for Richmond

== See also ==
- Leonard Phillips (1870–1947), New Zealand politician
