= Lovell Phillips =

Philip Lovell Phillips was the Dean of Barbados from 1898 to 1917.

Philips was educated at The Lodge School, Barbados and Worcester College, Oxford. He was at St Andrew, Barbados and then St Peter, on the same island before his cathedral appointment.
