= Philip Phillips (photographer) =

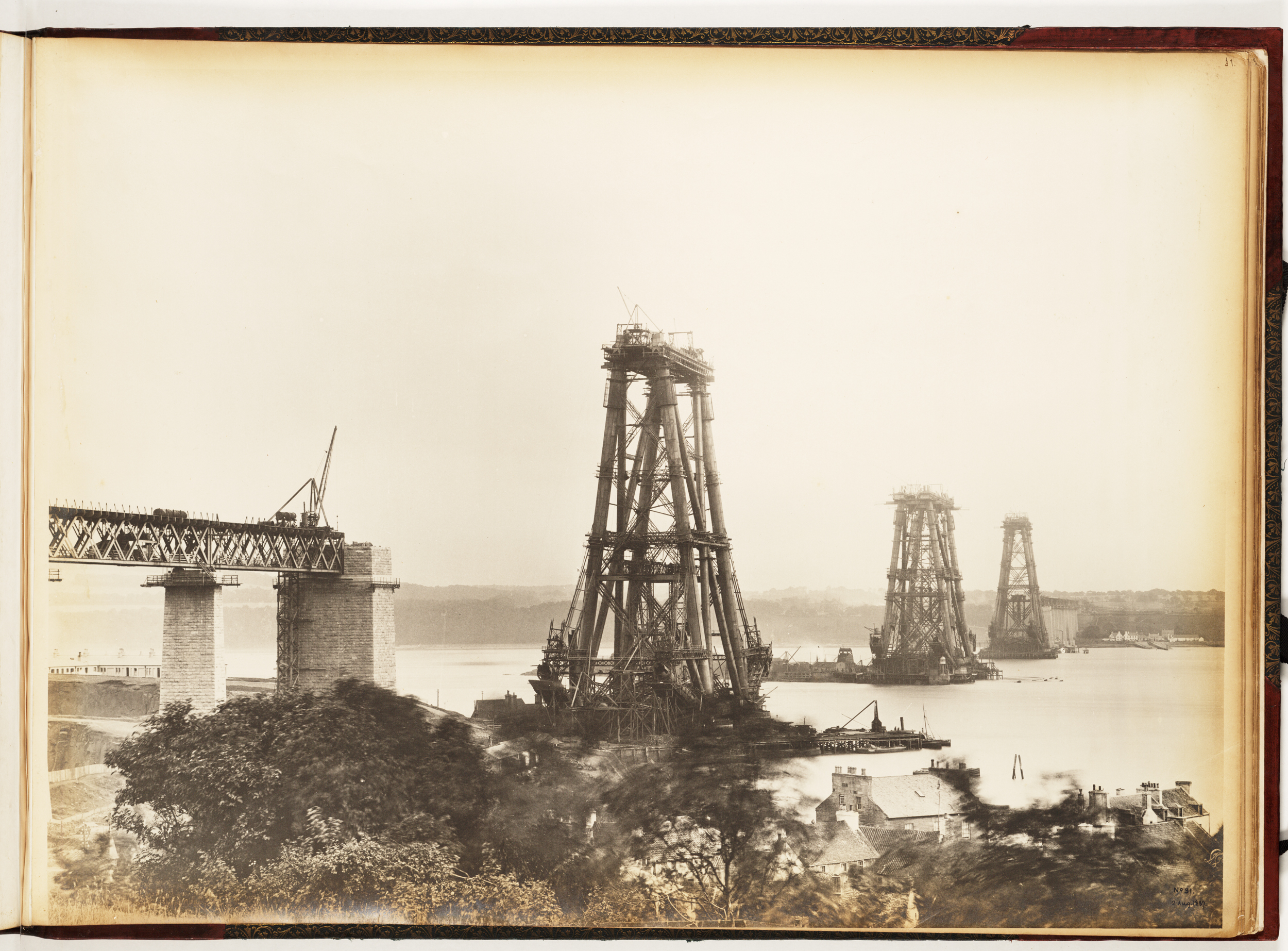
Phillips' photograph of the Forth Bridge from North Queensferry hills showing the three cantilevers at near their full height

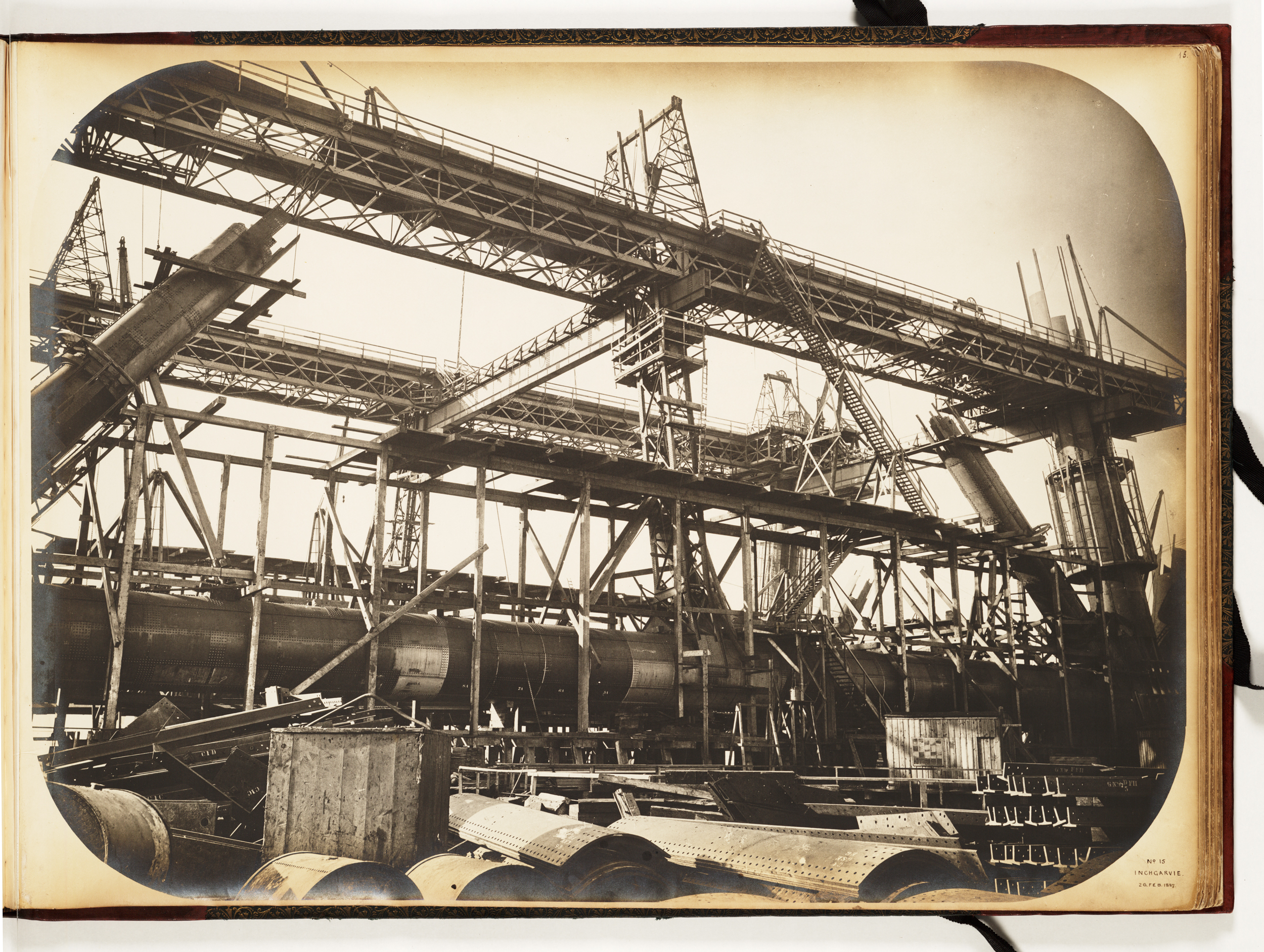
The Inchgarvie cantilever as seen from the landing stage

Joseph Philip Phillips (1857 or 1858–1891 or 1892), known as Philip Phillips, was a merchant seaman and a photographer. He is best known for his photographs of the construction of the Forth Bridge.

== Life ==
Philip Phillips was born in either 1857 or 1858, and was educated at Chester College in England under the direction of the Reverend Arthur Rigg. After he left school he entered the office of a mining engineer. He left the mining profession to become a merchant seaman and left the service after an attack of rheumatic fever in China. He then took up photography enthusiastically and served in the capacity of photographer on the Forth Bridge works. The photographs he took of the bridge were reproduced in an album entitled The Forth Bridge illustrations 1886-1887, which when published received favourable reviews.

Phillips died at the age of 34 after a short illness of four days, from an attack of influenza that developed into pneumonia. He is buried at Handsworth Old Church near Birmingham.

His father was Joseph Phillips, a contractor specialising in ironwork who worked on the Crystal Palace, the Newark Dyke railway bridge, Birmingham New Street railway station and was part of the consortium to build the Forth Bridge.
