= Kieran Phillips =

Kieran Phillips may refer to:

- Kieran Phillips (footballer, born 2000), footballer who plays for Ross County
- Kieran Phillips (footballer, born 2002), footballer who plays for Gloucester City
