= Jason Phillips =

Jason Phillips is the name of:

- Jason Phillips (catcher) (born 1976), MLB catcher
- Jason Phillips (pitcher) (born 1974), MLB pitcher
- Jason Phillips (linebacker) (born 1986), American football linebacker
- Jason Phillips (wide receiver) (born 1966), American football wide receiver
- Jadakiss (born Jason Phillips in 1975), rapper
