= Todd Phillips (disambiguation) =

Todd Phillips (born 1970) is an American film director.

Todd Phillips may also refer to:

- Todd Phillips (basketball) (born 1973), American basketball coach
- Todd Phillips (musician) (born 1953), American bassist
