= Thomas Philips (Irish politician) =

Irish Member of Parliament

Thomas Philips (October 1671 – 1731) was an MP from 1692 to 1693 for Clonmines, a Parliament of Ireland constituency.
