= Monifa Phillips =

British physicist

Monifa Louise Phillips is the first black woman to receive a Doctor of Philosophy (PhD) in physics from the University of Glasgow, which was founded in 1451. Phillips did her PhD within the Materials and Condensed Matter Physics group and defended her thesis entitled "Spectroscopic investigation of resistive switching mechanisms in pulsed laser deposited metal-oxide thin films". Her experimental research investigated the deposition and spectroscopic analysis of metal-oxide thin films for applications in Resistive random-access memory (RRAM), an emerging non-volatile memory storage technology. She was awarded her doctorate in 2019.

Phillips, originally from London, graduated with a Master's degree (MPhys) in Physics from the University of Sheffield in 2014. Phillips has been outspoken about the lack of diversity in her field:

"This week I was the very first black woman to graduate from the Uni of Glasgow with a PhD in Physics," Phillips wrote. "I'm a proud Black British woman from LDN. I made space for myself in a predominantly white, male field. It was hard, but with the support of my family & my community, I did it.

A motion to congratulate Phillips for being the first black female PhD physics graduate from the University of Glasgow fell in the Scottish Parliament.

Phillips is now training to be a patent attorney in electronics and engineering.
