= Ian Phillips (South African politician) =

South African politician and academic (died 2007)

Member of the National Assembly
- In office 1994–1996
- Constituency: KwaZulu-Natal

Personal details
- Born: Ian Munro Phillips; 1958/1959 Nairobi, Kenya
- Died: 26 March 2007 (aged 48) Cape Town, South Africa
- Citizenship: South Africa
- Party: African National Congress
- Other political affiliations: South African Communist Party
- Education: Rhodes University

Ian Munro Phillips (c. 1958 – 26 March 2007) was a South African academic, politician, and civil servant. He represented the African National Congress (ANC) in the National Assembly from 1994 to 1996. After that, he was special advisor to Minister Jeff Radebe until his death in 2007.

A historian by training, Phillips was formerly a lecturer at the University of Natal between 1987 and 1994. During that period, he and Radebe worked together in the ANC, arming ANC-aligned self-defence units in the Natal province.

== Early life and academic career ==
Born in Nairobi, Kenya in 1958 or 1959, Phillips trained as a historian, graduating from Rhodes University. He was an academic in the political studies department at the University of Natal's Durban campus from 1987 to 1994, with regional concentrations in Southern Africa and the Soviet Union.

== Self-defence units ==
Phillips officially joined the ANC in 1990, the year that it was unbanned by the apartheid government. He also joined the South African Communist Party. He served on the executive committee of the ANC's new Durban Central branch until the end of 1990, when he was elected to the party's regional executive committee for Southern Natal. In addition, he was a member of the Military Research Group, the ANC's Johannesburg-based think tank that developed the party's defence policy during the negotiations to end apartheid. In that capacity, he became involved in the political education – and ultimately in the management – of ANC-aligned self-defence units in Natal.

The units comprised ANC supporters whom the party armed and trained during the ongoing low-intensity civil conflict with Inkatha supporters. Phillips and Jeff Radebe were asked by Umkhonto we Sizwe (MK) chief of staff Chris Hani to facilitate weapons-supply chains and communication links between MK headquarters and Natal's self-defence units. Phillips and Radebe later estimated that, between 1990 and 1994, they were involved in distributing about 150 weapons to self-defence units, including machine guns and hand grenades. At the Truth and Reconciliation Commission in 1998–1999, they applied for and received amnesty for their role in arms trafficking.

== Post-apartheid career ==
In the 1994 South African general election, South Africa's first under universal suffrage, Phillips was elected to an ANC seat in the National Assembly, representing the KwaZulu-Natal constituency. He resigned from his seat in early 1996 in order to become a special adviser to his former comrade, Jeff Radebe, who was then serving as Minister of Public Works. Over the next decade, he followed Radebe to the Ministry of Public Enterprises and then to the Ministry of Transport, where he remained Radebe's special advisor until his death in 2007. He was also a former director at Denel.

== Personal life and death ==
Phillips was HIV-positive. He was admitted to the Christiaan Barnard Memorial Hospital in Cape Town on 26 February 2007, suffering from cytomegalovirus-induced pneumonia, and died there on 26 March 2007. Radebe, who said he and Phillips were as close as brothers, disclosed Phillips's HIV status after his death with the support of Phillips's family, who urged others with HIV to share their status and seek treatment.
