= Alan Phillips =

Alan Phillips is the name of:

- Alan Phillips (baseball) (born 1956), South African baseball player
- Alan Phillips (chess player) (1923–2009), British chess player
- Alan Phillips (rugby union) (born 1954), Welsh rugby player

== See also ==
- Allan Phillips, Venezuelan composer
- Allan Robert Phillips, American ornithologist
