= Frank Phillips (Missouri politician) =

American politician (born 1862)

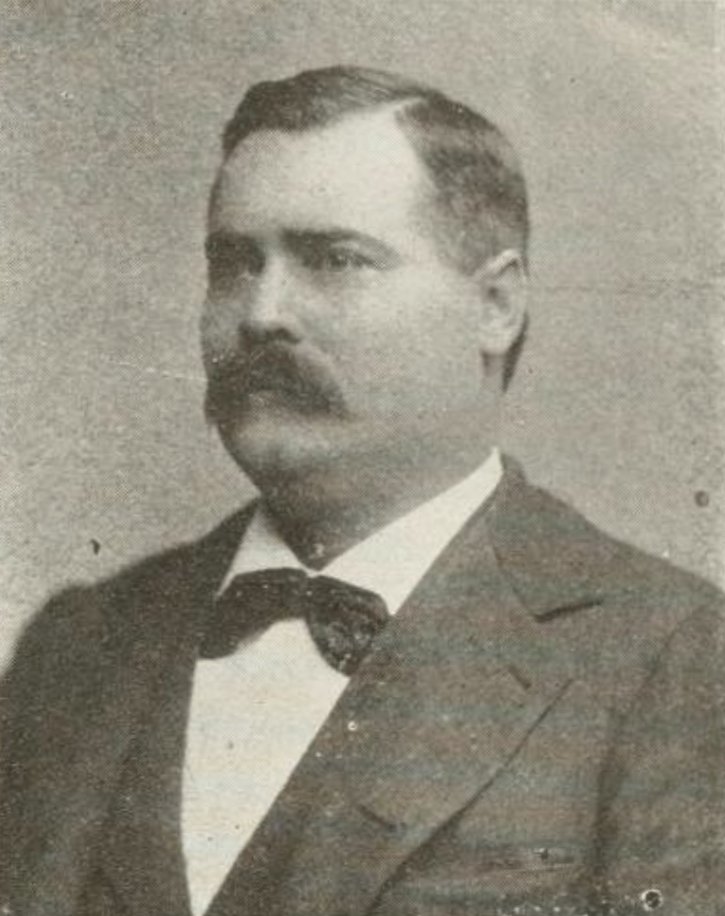
- Phillips (c. 1902)

Personal details
- Born: May 2, 1862 Independence, Missouri, U.S.
- Died: September 16, 1926 (aged 64) Kansas City, Missouri, U.S.
- Resting place: Mount Saint Mary's Cemetery; Kansas City, Missouri, U.S.
- Party: Democratic

Frank Phillips (May 2, 1862 – September 16, 1926) was a member of the Missouri House of Representatives.

== Early life ==
Frank Phillips was born on May 2, 1862, in Independence, Missouri. He attended public schools there.

== Career ==
At the age of eighteen, Phillips became a conductor for the street railway company. In 1888, Phillips was made the supervisor of the Tenth Street and Brooklyn Avenue line.

Phillips was a Democrat. Phillips was elected to the Kansas City, Missouri City Council for two terms. He then served as a member of the Kansas House of Representatives.

== Personal life ==
Phillips married and had one child, Robert F. (or Frank F), sources differ.

Phillips died on September 16, 1926, at his home, 3416 Michigan Avenue, in Kansas City, Missouri. He was buried at Mount Saint Mary's Cemetery in Kansas City.
