= Frederick Phillips (civil servant) =

Sir Frederick Phillips (18 December 1884 – 14 August 1943) was a British civil servant and expert on international finance. He was Deputy Controller (1931) and Permanent Under-Secretary (1932-9) at the UK Treasury. At the Ottawa Conference in 1932, on new economic arrangements within the British Empire he was the government's chief expert. He was knighted (KCMG) in 1933.

He was Chairman of the Financial Committee of the League of Nations and the head of the British Treasury Mission in Washington D.C. during the Second World War.

== Early life ==
He was the son of a London school-master. He was educated at Aske's School at New Cross before going on to Cambridge University where he had a brilliant career.

== Death ==
He died suddenly in University College Hospital London having recently returned by plane from Washington.
