= Ray Phillips =

Ray Phillips may refer to:

- Ray Phillips (musician) (born 1949), Welsh rock drummer, original member of Budgie
- Ray Phillips (American football) (born 1954), NFL player
- Ray Phillips (cricketer) (born 1954), Australian cricketer
- Raymond Phillips (Jamaican cricketer) (1900–1970), Jamaican cricketer
- Raymond Phillips (judge) (1915–1982), British judge
- Ray (Ramon) Phillips (born 1939), Welsh singer, member of The Nashville Teens
- Ray Phillips, American amateur boxer, List of U.S. national Golden Gloves champions
- Ray Phillips, character in the Belizean TV drama, Noh Matta Wat!
