= Amy Phillips =

Amy Phillips may refer to:

- Amy Phillips (cyclist) (born 1973), American racing cyclist
- Amy Phillips (actress) (born 1978), British actress
- Aimee Phillips (born 1991), New Zealand footballer
