= Adam Phillips =

Adam Phillips may refer to the following people:

- Adam Phillips (animator) (born 1971), Australian animator, known as Chluaid online
- Adam Phillips (psychologist) (born 1954), British child psychotherapist, literary critic, and essayist
- Adam Phillips (musician), British jazz and blues guitarist and singer
- Adam Phillips (footballer) (born 1998), English footballer
