= Oliver Phillips (ecologist) =

British ecologist

Oliver L. Phillips FRS
- Education: University of Cambridge; Washington University in St. Louis
- Known for: Ecology of tropical forests
- Scientific career
- Workplaces: University of Leeds
- Thesis: Comparative Valuation of Tropical Forests in Amazonian Peru
- Website: Official website

Oliver Lawrence Phillips is a British ecologist who specializes in tropical forests and is currently Professor of Tropical Ecology in the School of Geography at the University of Leeds. He is noted for his work coordinating large-scale, collaborative research projects that study how humans have changed the world's tropical forests, and the implications for climate change.

== Early life and career ==
Phillips studied Natural Sciences at St Catharine's College, University of Cambridge. He took his Ph.D. at Washington University in St. Louis from 1988 to 1993, with a thesis titled "Comparative Valuation of Tropical Forests in Amazonian Peru", and a period of study at Missouri Botanical Garden. He moved to Leeds University in 1995 and has worked there ever since.

== Research interests ==
Phillips' research goal is "to understand the dynamics of carbon and biodiversity across the world's tropical forests, how these change with our changing climate, and how they may feedback on the whole planet".

With this in mind, he currently coordinates two large-scale collaborative research projects: ForestPlots.net, established in 2009, which monitors over 6,150 areas of forestry (comprising 2.4 million trees of around 15,000 species) in 62 countries through a network of over 2,500 researchers, and RAINFOR (Red Amazónica de Inventarios Forestales/Amazon Forest Inventory Network), established in 2000, in which 100 researchers from 15 countries share data and collaborate on rainforest research (currently documented in over 300 published papers). According to Phillips, this collaborative approach "provides a unique perspective on forest carbon storage and fluxes, which is measured on-the-ground across the tropics by thousands of skilled scientists".

Phillips has argued that "grassroots" contributions like these are vital to tackling two of the world's most pressing environmental problems: "To make the most of what nature can offer to tackle biodiversity loss and the climate crisis, we need to start by properly valuing the tropical scientists measuring them and the forest communities whose lives depend on them".

Data from these projects has been used to estimate the number of tree species on Earth at roughly 73,000, including 9,200 that have not yet been discovered. Around 40 percent of the undiscovered species are thought to be in South America. According to Phillips: "With 3,900 tree species yet to be discovered in this one continent, our analysis shows that many are concentrated in endangered hotspots of diversity where the Amazon forest meets the Andes in Peru, Colombia, Ecuador, Venezuela and Bolivia. This makes forest science and conservation of paramount priority in South America".

Phillips' work has also included long-term studies of Borneo's rainforests, their ability to act as effective carbon sinks, and their vulnerability to droughts and changes in land use.

== Awards ==
Phillips was elected a Fellow of the Royal Society in 2020.

== Selected publications ==
=== Books ===
- Malhi, Yadvinder; Phillips, Oliver (2005). Tropical Forests and Global Atmospheric Change. Oxford University Press. ISBN 978-0-19-152427-1.

=== Papers ===
- Thomas, Chris D.; Cameron, Alison; Green, Rhys E.; Bakkenes, Michel; Beaumont, Linda J.; et al. (January 2004). "Extinction risk from climate change". Nature. 427 (6970): 145–148. Bibcode:2004Natur.427..145T. doi:10.1038/nature02121. eISSN 1476-4687. ISSN 0028-0836. PMC 9188839. PMID 14712274.
- Pan, Yude; Birdsey, Richard A.; Fang, Jingyun; Houghton, Richard; Kauppi, Pekka E.; et al. (19 August 2011). "A Large and Persistent Carbon Sink in the World's Forests". Science. 333 (6045): 988–993. Bibcode:2011Sci...333..988P. doi:10.1126/science.1201609. eISSN 1095-9203. ISSN 0036-8075. PMID 21764754. S2CID 42458151.
- Phillips, Oliver L.; Malhi, Yadvinder; Higuchi, Niro; Laurance, William F.; Núñez, Percy V.; et al. (16 October 1998). "Changes in the Carbon Balance of Tropical Forests: Evidence from Long-Term Plots". Science. 282 (5388): 439–442. Bibcode:1998Sci...282..439P. doi:10.1126/science.282.5388.439. eISSN 1095-9203. ISSN 0036-8075. PMID 9774263.
- Brienen, R. J. W.; Phillips, O. L.; Feldpausch, T. R.; Gloor, E.; Baker, T. R.; et al. (March 2015). "Long-term decline of the Amazon carbon sink". Nature. 519 (7543): 344–348. Bibcode:2015Natur.519..344B. doi:10.1038/nature14283. eISSN 1476-4687. hdl:10871/17031. ISSN 0028-0836. PMID 25788097. S2CID 2972815.
