= Thomas Phillips (disambiguation) =

Thomas Phillips (1770–1845) was an English painter.

Thomas or Tom Phillips may also refer to:

== Business ==
- Thomas L. Phillips Jr., businessman, co-founder of Spy magazine
- Tom Phillips, former chief executive officer of Mitsubishi Motors Australia
- Thomas L. Phillips, chairman and chief executive officer of Raytheon

== Arts and entertainment ==
- Thomas King Ekundayo Phillips (1884–1969), Nigerian organist, conductor, composer and teacher
- Thomas Hal Phillips (1922–2007), American actor and screenwriter
- Tom Phillips (artist) (1937–2022), English artist
- Tom Phillips (Australian artist), Australian painter, winner of the 2022 Guildhouse Fellowship
- Tom Phillips (musician), American musician in the band While Heaven Wept
- Tom Phillips, Australian film producer, producer of Lesbian Space Princess (2024)
- Tom Phillips, author of 2018 non-fiction book Humans: A Brief History of How We F*cked It All Up

== Law ==
- Thomas Hawthorne Phillips (1914–1975), Justice of the Supreme Court of Texas
- Thomas W. Phillips (judge) (born 1943), federal judge, District Court for the Eastern District of Tennessee
- Thomas R. Phillips (born 1949), Chief Justice of the Texas Supreme Court

== Politics ==
- Thomas Phillips (Irish adventurer) (1560–1633), founder of Limavady, governor of the county of Coleraine, first license to distil whiskey
- Thomas Phillips (mayor) (1801–1867), Welsh lawyer, politician and businessman
- Thomas Wharton Phillips (1835–1912), Republican member of the U.S. House of Representatives from Pennsylvania
- Thomas Wharton Phillips Jr. (1874–1956), Republican member of the U.S. House of Representatives from Pennsylvania
- Thomas Williams Phillips (1883–1966), British civil servant
- Tom Phillips (diplomat) (born 1950), British diplomat
- Tom Phillips (Kansas politician) (born 1956), Republican member of the Kansas House of Representatives
- Thomas Phillips (MP for Hastings) (died 1626), MP for Hastings
- Sir Thomas Phelipps, 1st Baronet or Thomas Phillips, MP for Winchester
- Thomas Phelips or Phillips, MP for Poole and Wareham

== Sports ==
- Tommy Phillips (1883–1923), Canadian ice hockey star and war hero
- Tom Phillips (baseball) (1889–1929), American baseball pitcher for the Baltimore Orioles and Cleveland Indians
- Tom Phillips (racing driver) (born 1962), American race car driver
- Tom Hannifan (born 1989), American wrestling commentator better known as Tom Phillips in WWE
- Tom Phillips (Australian footballer) (born 1996), for the Hawthorn Football Club
- Tom Phillips (rugby union) (born 1996), Welsh rugby player
- Thomas Phillips (rower), American rower who won gold medal at the 1979 World Rowing Championships

== Other people ==
- Thomas Phelippes (1556–1625), English intelligence agent, also known as Thomas Phillips
- Thomas Phillipps (1792–1872), British antiquary and book collector
- Thomas Phillips (educational benefactor) (1760–1851), founder of Llandovery College in Wales
- Thomas Phillips (engineer) (died 1693), English military engineer
- Thomas Phillips (priest) (1708–1774), English Jesuit biographer
- Thomas Benbow Phillips (1829–1915), pioneer of the Welsh settlements in Brazil
- Thomas G. Phillips (1937–2022), English physicist and astronomer
- Thomas Jodrell Phillips (1807–1897), English philanthropist, changed his name to Thomas Jodrell Phillips Jodrell in 1868
- Tom Phillips (Royal Navy officer) (1888–1941), British admiral
- Tom Phillips (1987–2025), New Zealand father involved in the 2021 Phillips family disappearances

== See also ==
- Thomas Phelpes, MP
- Thomas Philips (disambiguation)
