= James Phillips (South African cricketer) =

South African cricketer (born 1963)

Personal information
- Born: 9 March 1963 (age 63); Queenstown, South Africa
- Source: Cricinfo, 12 December 2020

James Phillips (born 9 March 1963) is a South African former cricketer. He played in one first-class and one List A match for Border in 1987/88.

== See also ==
- List of Border representative cricketers
