= Tony Phillips (disambiguation) =

Tony Phillips (1959–2016) was an American baseball player.

Tony Phillips may also refer to:

- Tony Phillips (British artist) (born 1961), British artist and printmaker
- Tony Phillips (American artist) (born 1937), American artist and educator
