= Hawthorne Phillips =

American judge (1914–1975)

Thomas Hawthorne Phillips (December 30, 1914 – October 23, 1975) was a justice of the Supreme Court of Texas from October 4, 1972 to December 31, 1972.

Born in Marlin, Texas, Phillips received his law degree from Baylor Law School in 1937, and gained admission to the bar that same year.

Political offices
Preceded by Joe R. Greenhill	Justice of the Texas Supreme Court; 1972	Succeeded by Sam Johnson
