= Scotia Prince Cruises =

- Industry: Shipping
- Founded: 1970 (as Lion Ferry)
- Defunct: 2004
- Fate: Dissolved
- Headquarters: Portland, United States
- Area served: Gulf of Maine
- Services: Passenger transportation Freight transportation
- Website: www.scotiaprincecruises.com

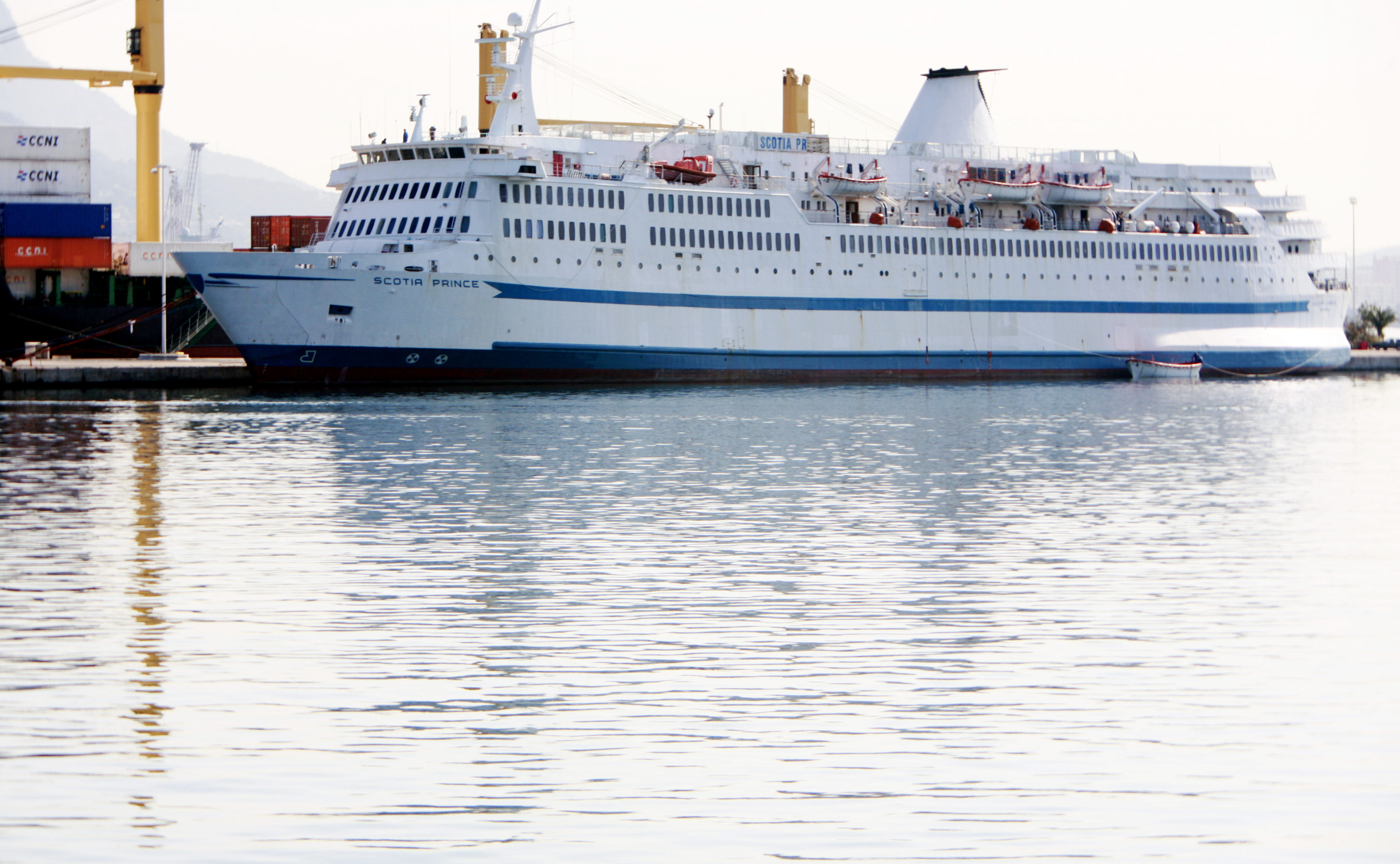
MS Scotia Prince

Scotia Prince Cruises was a cruise ferry operator based in Maine which owned and operated the M/S Scotia Prince. This ferry operated across the Gulf of Maine between Portland, Maine, and Yarmouth, Nova Scotia, until the end of the 2004 sailing season.

== Lion Ferry ==
The Portland-Yarmouth seasonal (summer only) ferry service was established in 1970 by European ferry operator Lion Ferry. The first vessel was the M/S Prince of Fundy which operated from 1970 to 1976. She was assisted on the route between 1973 and 1976 by the M/S Bolero. Between 1976 and 1981 the only vessel in use was the M/S Caribe.

Lion Ferry leased the International Marine Terminal from the City of Portland. At the City's request the original lease included a clause for bilateral "route protection" which prevented Lion from operating a route from any other New England port to Nova Scotia, and prevented the City from allowing another operator to sail to Nova Scotia during Lion's operating season. The City's facilities were used by other operators including cruise ships. Lion also used the Yarmouth Ferry Terminal in Nova Scotia which was owned by the federal Department of Transport, although Lion had to share its Yarmouth facility with Canadian National Railways which operated the MV Bluenose service to Bar Harbor, Maine.

From 1978 to 1982, CN Marine also operated the MV Marine Evangeline (ex-MS Duke of Yorkshire) between Yarmouth and another terminal owned by Canadian National Railways on the Portland waterfront.

== Prince of Fundy Cruises ==
The service was sold by Lion Ferry in 1982 to Baron Stig Leuhusen who established Prince of Fundy Cruises as a subsidiary of Panamanian-based Transworld Steamship Company. The vessel M/S Scotia Prince (ex-M/S Stena Olympica) was acquired and began service that season. In 1983, the other Yarmouth ferry operator, CN Marine, began using a sistership M/V Bluenose II (ex-M/S Stena Jutlandica) on its Bar Harbor crossing. Prince of Fundy Cruises had the Scotia Prince lengthened in 1987 for increased capacity, changing the visual similarities between both ships. Leuhusen died in 1996 and his estate listed the company for sale in 1999.

In August 2000 the company's shares were purchased by a group led by Matthew Hudson of Virginia. The company was renamed Scotia Prince Cruises. The Scotia Prince was re-flagged (Bahamas). The company upgraded the ship and onboard services in addition to other improvements made at the company. The service was repositioned from a transport provider to a transport and package vacation company. The service was marketed as a cruiseferry and destination in its own right.

The MS Scotia Prince crossings offered private staterooms, several lounges, live entertainment, a restaurant, coffee shop, Duty-free shop and a Casino. Cars, buses and trucks were conveyed on the lower decks.

In 1997, CN Marine's successor (government-owned and subsidized) Marine Atlantic Yarmouth-Bar Harbor service was privatized by the government and taken over, along with the M/V Bluenose, by Northumberland Ferries Limited which established a subsidiary service named Bay Ferries Limited. At the same time, the federal Department of Transport transferred operational responsibility of the Yarmouth ferry terminal to Bay Ferries. The Bluenose II was sold at the end of the 1997 season by Bay Ferries and the proceeds were used to purchase the high-speed catamaran ferry HSC INCAT 046, named The Cat. Service began the following summer in 1998 dropping the crossing time from 6 hours to 2.5 hours. A few years later, HSC INCAT 046 was replaced by a slightly larger ship, HSC The Cat, still referred to as The Cat.

During the winter of 2002–2003, Scotia Prince Cruises Ltd. inaugurated a service called the "Yucatan Express", using the M/S Scotia Prince on a route between Tampa, Florida, in the United States and Cancun, Quintana Roo, and Merida, Yucatán, in Mexico.

In 2004, the company discovered dangerous levels of mold in the City of Portland's terminal. The CDC's National Institute for Occupational Safety and Health evaluated the terminal in March 2005. Based on toxicological and remediation reports and NIOSH's comments on the then current state of the IMT and the likelihood that the building could not be made safe, SPC cancelled its 2005 season. NIOSH's final report reiterates their on-site evaluation stating "a health hazard did exist at the IMT building" and "Additional work has been done at the remaining north (east) building of the IMT since the NIOSH site visit. However, the underlying structural defects of the building have not been addressed, resulting in a high likelihood of continued microbial growth". Within hours of SPC notifying the City that it was cancelling the 2005 season for safety reasons, the City of Portland held a press conference announcing they had terminated SPC's lease. The City immediately evicted Scotia Prince Cruises.

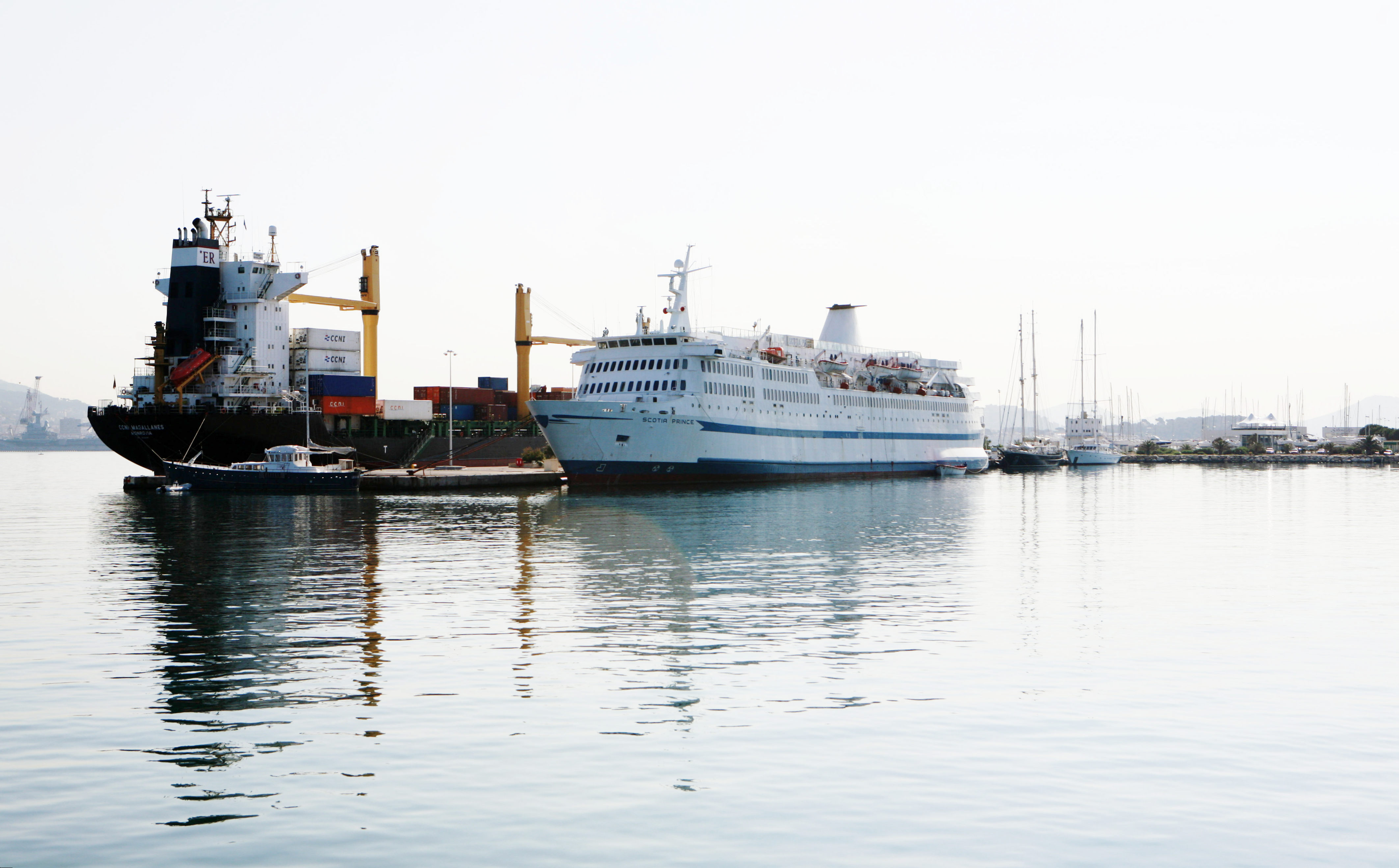
Scotia Prince moored in Toulon harbour in May 2009

The company will not resume services from Portland. The ship was laid-up in Charleston, South Carolina, in December 2004 and was placed on the market for charter or sale. Following Hurricane Katrina, the Federal Emergency Management Agency chartered the vessel in mid-September 2005 for 6 months as a floating hotel for victims made homeless from that natural disaster. The ship was eventually sold in early 2007. In late September 2005 it was announced that Bay Ferries Limited would begin offering high-speed service from Yarmouth-Portland in 2006 using HSC INCAT 059.

== Current status ==
Yucatán Express offered on-again, off-again pedestrian and vehicle ferry service on the Canadian ferry ship Scotia Prince. For a short time, it ran in the winter from Tampa, Florida, to Mérida, Mexico, and to Puerto Moreles near Cancún. However, this service was discontinued.

In March 2011, the vessel was acquired by Flemingo Liners, a UAE-registered company with roots in India, to revive the ferry route between India and Sri Lanka, which had been suspended in 1983 due to the Sri Lankan civil war. The vessel's first overnight sea crossing was on 11 June 2011, from Thoothukudi to Colombo harbour, which will be its standard route, taking 14 hours. The most expensive tickets are generally half-price compared to air tickets between Colombo and the nearest airports in south India, namely Chennai and Bengaluru.

The vessel was earlier idled in a Gibraltar dock between June 2010 and March 2011, after being briefly operated by Marmara Lines company between Ancona and Çeşme earlier in 2010.

On March 20, 2012, the media reports that the vessel was sold for scrap metal in India.

== See also ==
- The Boat Mail, the previous vessel serving the Colombo-Tuticorin route.
