= Henry Phillips =

Henry Phillips most commonly refers to:

- Henry F. Phillips (1890–1958), American businessman for which the Phillips-head screw and screwdriver is named
- Henry Phillips (comedian) (born 1969), American songwriter and humorist

Henry Phillips may also refer to:

== American ==
- Henry Phillips (politician) (died 1685), American colonial politician and businessman
- Henry M. Phillips (1811–1884), U.S. representative from Pennsylvania
- Henry Phillips (author) (1838–1895), American numismatist and translator
- Henry L. Phillips (1847–1947), American social reformer and Episcopal priest
- Henry D. Phillips (1882–1955), American football player and Episcopal bishop

== British ==
- Henry Phillips (horticulturist) (1779–1840), botanist, horticulturist and writer who worked in and around Brighton, England
- Henry Phillips (singer) (1801–1876), English singer
- Henry Wyndham Phillips (1820–1868), British portrait painter
- Henry Phillips (cricketer) (1844–1919), English cricketer
- H. D. Phillips (Henry Dominic Phillips, died 1892), British civil servant of the Indian civil service
- Sir Henry Phillips (colonial administrator) (1914–2004), British colonial administrator in Nyasaland, later Malawi
- Henry Phillips (clergyman), English clergyman who betrayed William Tyndale

== Other nationalities ==
- Henry Phillips (weightlifter), Panamanian weightlifter

== See also ==
- Phillips (surname)
- Philips (surname)
- Harry Phillips (disambiguation)
