= Yarmouth Stone =

Stone with human markings of unknown origin, considered runes in local popular culture

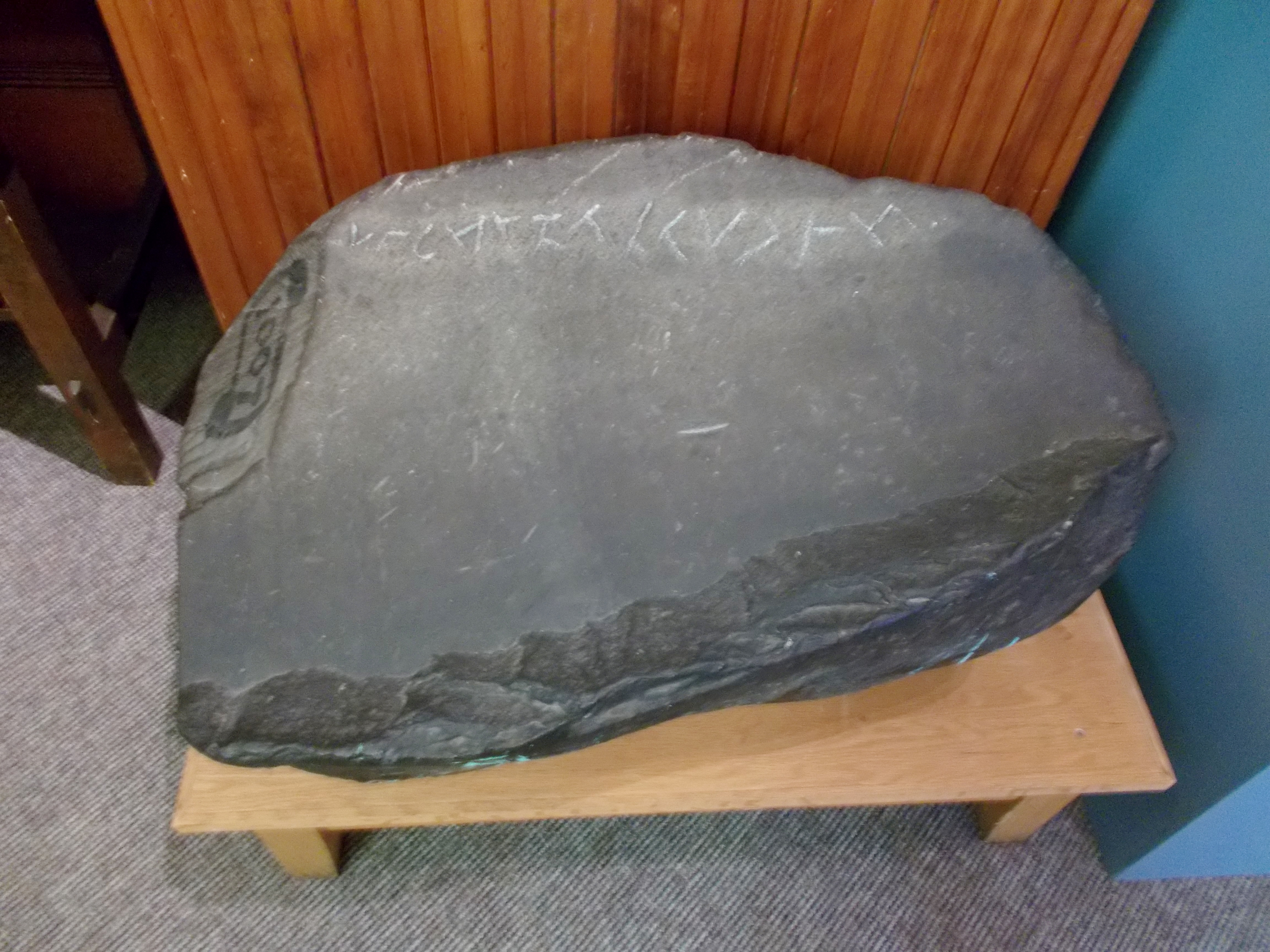
The stone as currently displayed at the Yarmouth County Museum.

The Yarmouth Stone, also known as the Yarmouth Runic Stone or the Fletcher Stone, is a slab of quartzite that first came to the attention of the public in the early 19th century. The stone appears to have an inscription carved into it which investigators have interpreted as Norse runes, Japanese, Basque, or early Greek. This has led to speculation that the Yarmouth, Nova Scotia area, in Canada, was visited by Viking explorers sometime around 1000 C.E. Many other theories have been put forward, including the possibility of a hoax or the inscription being a product of natural forces. The stone is currently on display at the Yarmouth County Museum.

== Description ==
The stone is made of quartzite, measures 31 in × 20 in × 13 in (79 cm × 51 cm × 33 cm), and weighs about 400 lb (180 kg). It has a purported runic inscription carved near the top of one naturally smooth face; the stone does not appear to have been dressed in any way. The inscribed characters are between 1 and 1 1/2 inches (25 and 38 mm) high. There are small amounts of modern green paint on its lower surface from an earlier display stand, and someone has written the date "1007" in modern ink marker to the left of the inscription.

== History of the stone ==
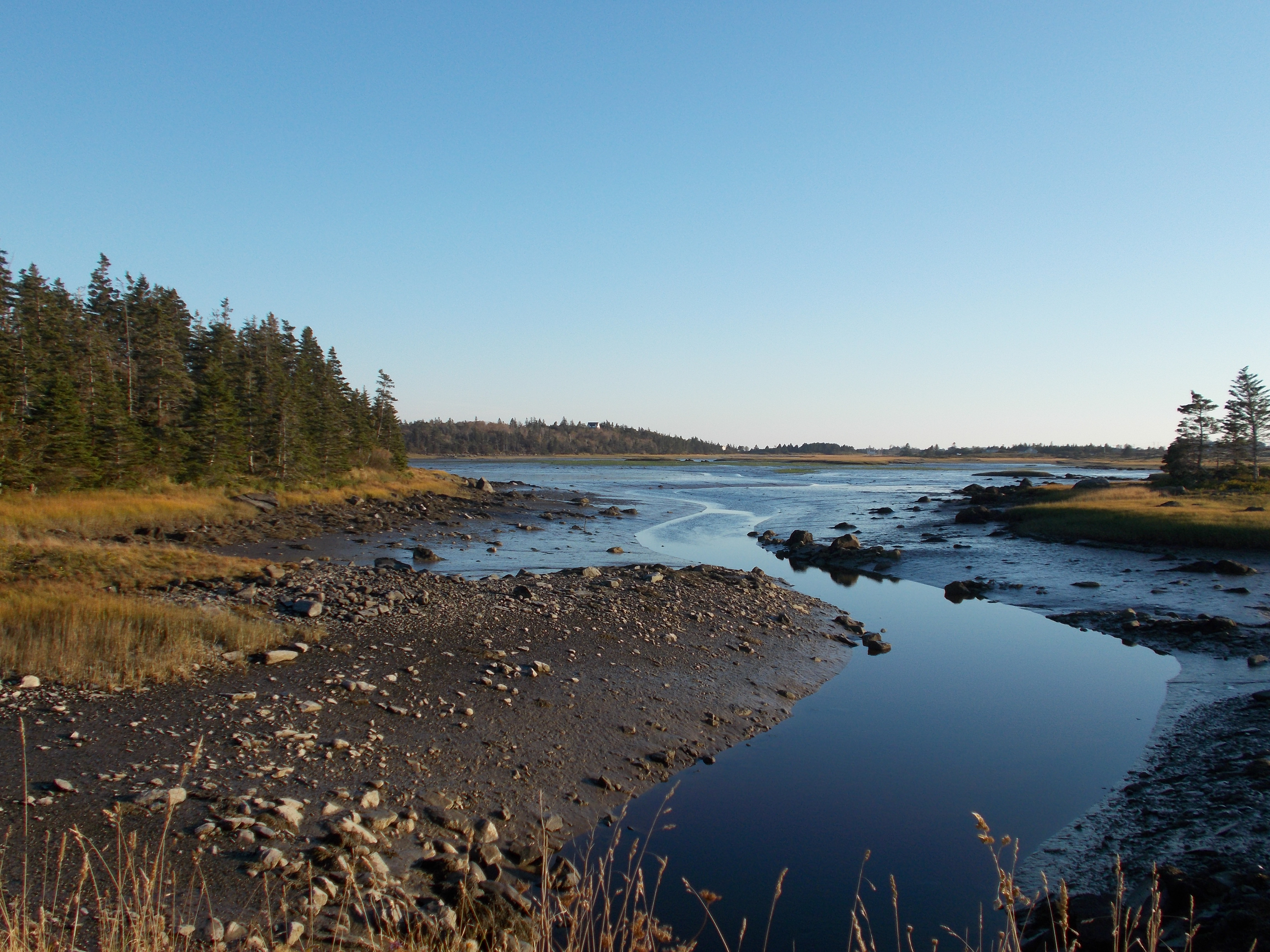
The Salt Pond at the northwest end of Yarmouth harbour. The stone was discovered in the now-wooded land on the left foreground.

Richard Fletcher, a retired surgeon of the British Army, settled in Yarmouth in 1809, on a lot of land at the northwest tip of the harbour. This was near the Salt Pond, part of which had been dyked off in 1799 to create a salt marsh. In 1812 he revealed his discovery of the stone, found on a point of land near the water. Fletcher died in 1819, but the stone remained on display on his property for some sixty years until it was moved into the town itself. Shortly thereafter the provincial Inspector of Mines, Henry S. Poole, attempted to have it moved to the Provincial Museum in Halifax, but it was not shipped due to a clerical error. It next came into the possession of Samuel N. Ryerson of Yarmouth, before passing to the Yarmouth Public Library in the early 20th century, and then to the Yarmouth County Museum.

== Interpretations ==
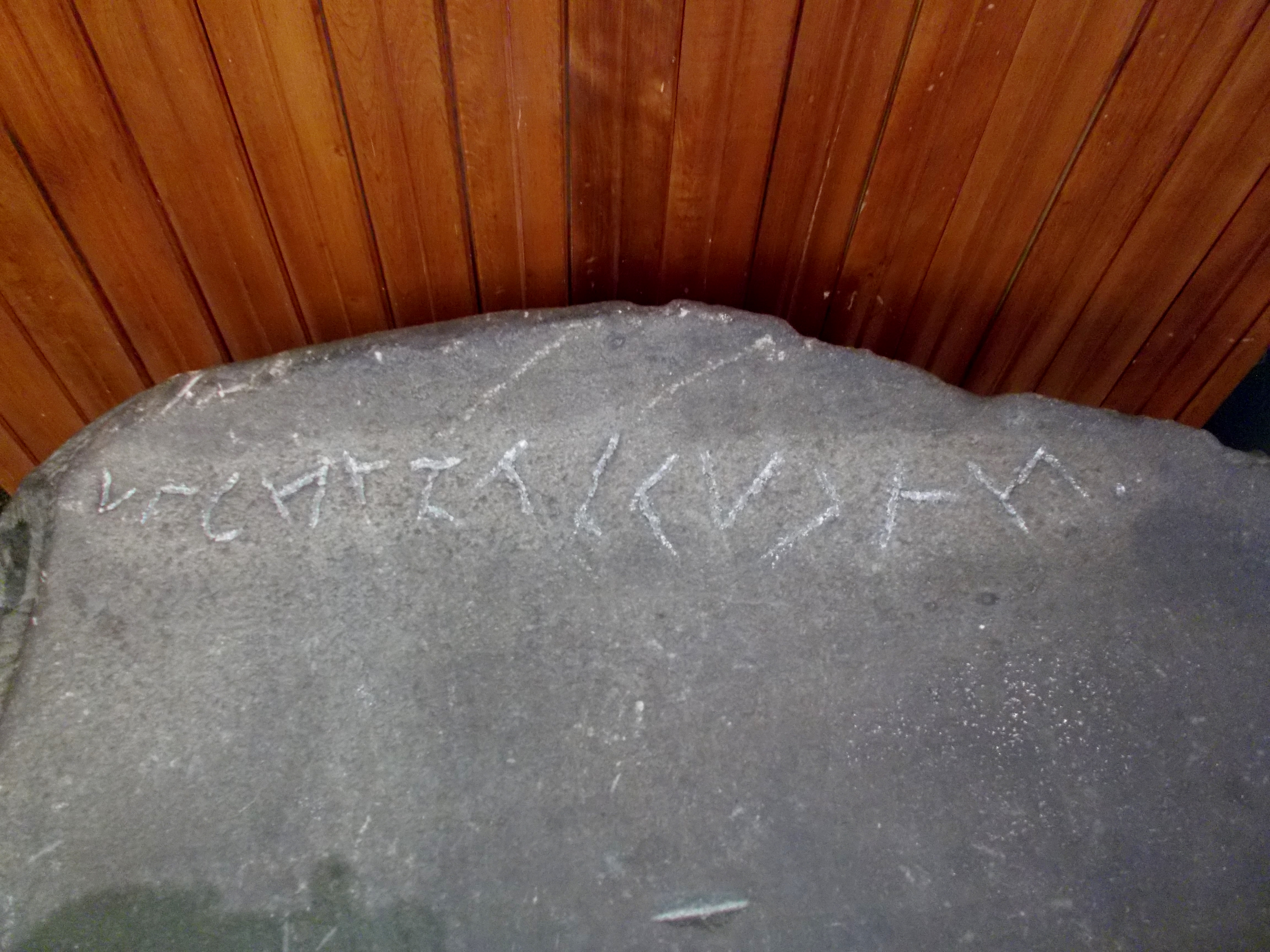
Closeup of the apparent inscription.

The stone remained a curiosity for the next 70 years after its discovery. In 1865, Sir Daniel Wilson referred to it briefly in his Prehistoric Man. It became much more widely known in 1884, when Henry Phillips, corresponding secretary of the Numismatic and Antiquarian Society of Philadelphia, published a paper claiming that the inscription is runic, and went so far as to translate it as "Hako's son addressed the men." Phillips identified Hako as one of the men of Thorfinn Karlsefni's expedition of ca. 1007 C.E., based on the Grœnlendinga saga and the Eiríks saga rauða. In his 1889 history of Yarmouth, George S. Brown accepted and supported Phillips' theory.

Another Norse translation came in 1934 from a student of runology, Olaf Strandwold, who claimed that the stone was inscribed by command of Leif Erikson, in honour of his father, and states that "Leif to Eric raises (this monument)". Erik Wahlgren commented on Strandwold's interpretations of various alleged runes, describing him as reading inscriptions forward and back, combining different time periods, and "shuffling and reshuffling the inscriptions until they yield a “meaning”—any meaning whatever." These interpretations took root in Yarmouth and in much of North America, long before it was proven that the Norse had actually reached the continent, with the discovery of the settlement at L'Anse aux Meadows in 1960.

The first refutation of the stone as a Norse artifact came from Wilson. In his 1890 monograph "The Vinland of the Northmen", published in the Transactions of the Royal Society of Canada, he deals with the stone at considerable length, and states that the supposed inscription does not agree with runic ones. The second came from Yarmouth's own Kenneth G. T. Webster, who failed to identify Yarmouth with the description of the places visited during Karlsefni's voyage, and in 1892, after reviewing the various claims made, that it was a Native, a Phoenician, a Norse, or a French inscription, came to the somewhat unwilling conclusion that it was made by the later English, either for amusement or for fraudulent purposes, "for it was not made without hands."

In the 1890s, local amateur historian Moses H. Nickerson began a study of the stone and of the various runic futharks. He eventually sent a print of the stone and its marks, via an intermediary, to Prof. Magnus Olsen in Kristiania (now Oslo), Norway, and received the following reply:

The marks on this "copy" are not runes; and as Mr. Nickerson, in his enclosed note points out, they have very little likeness to runes. They strike me as being a freak of nature, and would therefore advise that the "Runic(?) Stone" be examined by a geologist.

Interest in and belief in the authenticity of the stone grew however to the point where in the late 1930s plans for a national park were being considered. It is during this period that the president of the local historical society and the "Yarmouth Leif Erikson Memorial Society", the Reverend Gordon Lewis, wrote that Erikson had not only visited and left the stone but had also built a village, exploring the area for at least 12 years. It is also suggested, although not fully proven, that "Lewis believed in the stone so passionately that he took the bold step of “improving” it. The recalcitrant markings were allegedly “clarified” under his ministrations with hammer and chisel, transforming the faint tracings described in the nineteenth century into the much more emphatic text of the twentieth. (Herein lies one possible explanation for the striking difference between pre- and post-1930s images of the artifact.)"

In 1943 an official provincial guidebook, Historic Nova Scotia, described it as authentic. But then a Nova Scotia born professor of archaeology, A. D. Fraser, wrote that it showed saw marks and that "There is a strong probability, I think, that the thing is the work of an Indian of perhaps a century back who found a discarded ballast block and utilized it for his own purposes." He also wrote that the carvings were much poorer than runes that had examined and that he could "not see anything here that is more runic than Roman or Cypriote or of any other system that one might name." Strandwold, who had translated it in 1934, turned out to have no credentials and no knowledge of Old Norse. All mention of the stone was removed from "Historic Nova Scotia". Despite all this in 1947 the local museum ordered more copies of Standwold's pamphlet on the stone, and others claiming expertise continued to pronounce it genuine. New interpretations were brought forward - Hungarian, Welsh, Mayan, and in 1993 the local paper ran an editorial titled "The 'runic stone' - why don't we just say it was left by aliens?"

The Yarmouth County Museum lists a number of other theories on a placard near the stone. The museum prefers to remain neutral on all theories about the stone.

== Other stones ==
Sketches of the Yarmouth Runic Stone (top) and the so-called Bay View Stone, which is currently missing.

Other stones with apparent inscriptions have also been reported in the Yarmouth area. Sometime between 1895 and 1898 a stone was discovered at Bay View Park, a tourist resort directly across the harbour from the town of Yarmouth, in Overton, within 1 km of the original site of the Fletcher Stone. The Bay View stone has a similar flat surface of similar size and shape; its composition is unknown. Its supposed inscription is almost identical to that of the Fletcher Stone, with a few additional markings on a second line. The stone was referred to in Robert R. McLeod's 1903 book, Markland or Nova Scotia, pp 154 – 55.

In 1912, while the grounds of Bay View Park were being put in order, the stone was placed in a new stone wall by workmen. Shortly afterwards the proprietor, Mr. Drew, said he would be glad to have it taken out at any time for examination. However, in the century since then its location has been lost and is currently unknown. Historian Ian McKay wrote that the stone was "now revealed as a crude hoax associated with a local resort".

In February, 1880, a letter from T.B. Flint of Yarmouth was read before the Numismatic and Antiquarian Society of Philadelphia, in which he stated that on an island near the mouth of the Tusket River there are also two very large stones with inscriptions similar to those on the Fletcher Stone. Flint wrote that "the spot was very difficult of access by land, but not by water, although it is not in any frequented route." These are believed to the same stones referred to by R.B. Brown in a letter published in the Proceedings of the Nova Scotian Institute of Science, vol. VIII, pp xxxvi - xxxviii, in 1892. The exact location of these stones is currently unknown.

According to notes on file at the Yarmouth County Museum, yet another inscribed stone was incorporated into a stone wall on the former Burrill property in Yarmouth, near the southeast corner of Starrs Road and Pleasant Street.

== In local culture ==
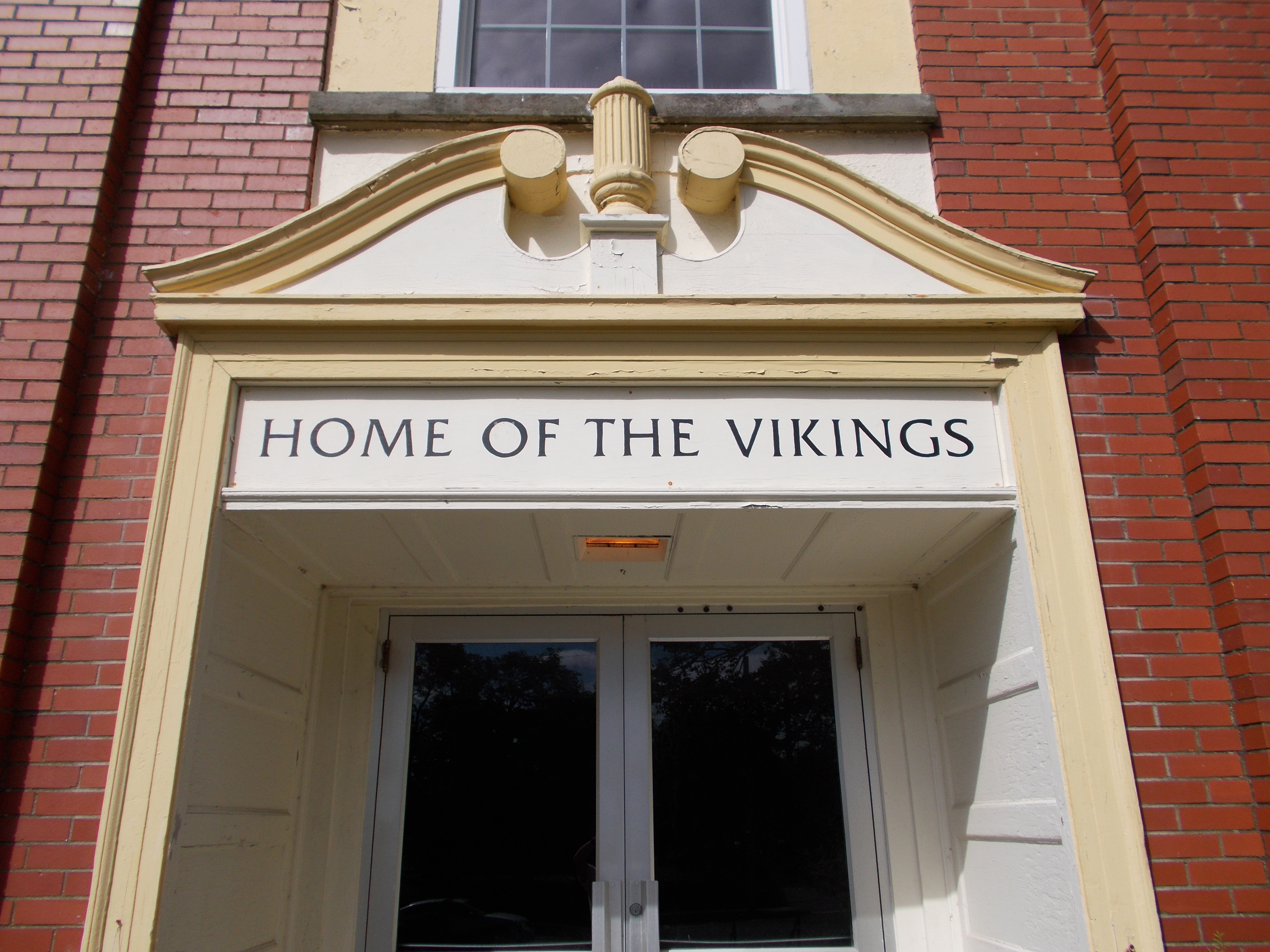
The main entrance to the former Yarmouth Consolidated Memorial High School

The stone and the presumed connection it made between Yarmouth and the medieval Norse, influenced popular culture in the community from the late 19th century until the present day.

- A tourist resort built in Cape Forchu in the late 1800s was named the Markland Hotel.
- The sports teams of Yarmouth Consolidated Memorial High School (est. 1951) are called the Vikings.
- The sports teams of Burridge Campus, Nova Scotia Community College have Marvel Comics' Thor as a mascot.
- During the early 1970s the Yarmouth Town and County Tourist Association promoted Route 304, from Milton to Cape Forchu, as Lief Eriksen Drive. This secondary highway runs past the site of the discovery of the stone.
- Also at present, the Markland Viking Project is doing re-enacting of the Norse lifestyle in locations around Yarmouth.
- In Sept. 2011, during the celebrations of the 250th anniversary of the founding of Yarmouth Township, an international symposium on the stone was hosted by the Yarmouth County Museum.
