= John Patch =

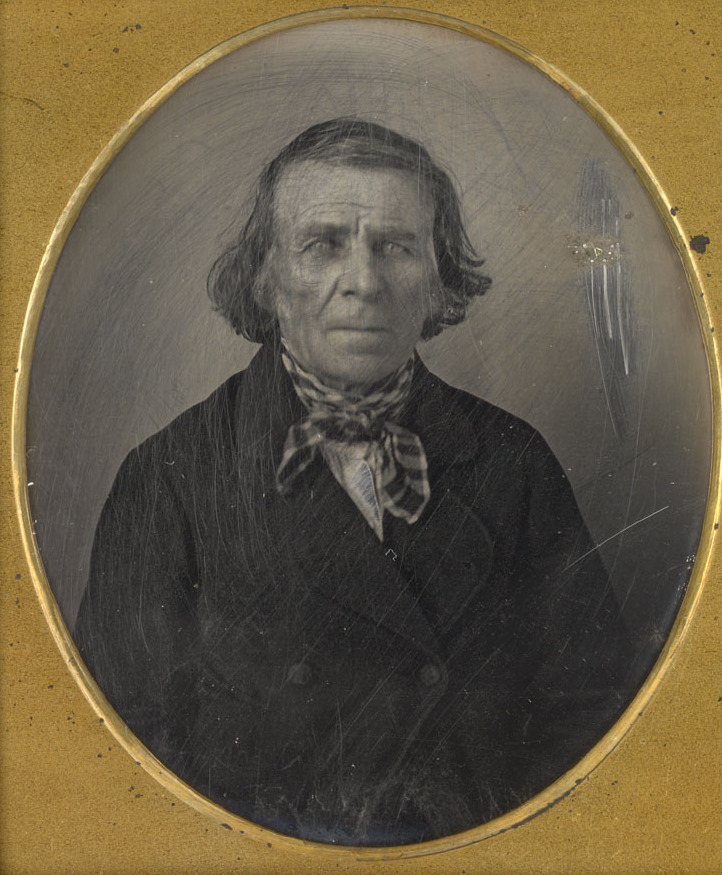
- Born: 1781; Yarmouth, Nova Scotia, British Empire
- Died: August 27, 1861; Yarmouth, Nova Scotia
- Occupation: Fisherman
- Known for: Inventing one of the first versions of the screw propeller.

John Patch (1781 – August 27, 1861) was a Nova Scotian fisherman who invented one of the first versions of the screw propeller.

== Early life ==
Patch was born in Yarmouth, Nova Scotia in 1781. His father Nehemiah was a Yarmouth sea captain who died in a shipwreck at Seal Island, Nova Scotia soon after John Patch's birth.

== Fishing career ==
Earning a living as a mariner and fishermen, Patch observed the efficiency of small boats propelled by single oar sculling and began to experiment with a propeller based in the motions of a sculling oar. During the winter of 1832-1833 he built a hand-cranked version of a doubled-bladed fan-shaped propeller. He demonstrated his propeller during the summer of 1833 before crowds watching as his small boat moved, seemingly magically, across Yarmouth Harbour. Patch further experimented by attaching his invention to a 25-ton coastal schooner named Royal George in the Bay of Fundy. The propeller allowed Royal George to enter Saint John Harbour in a calm which stranded other sailing vessels. Patch's invention was 4 years before John Ericsson's famous patent on the screw propeller in Britain. Patch lacked the funds to travel to Britain for a patent but instead tried to patent his propeller in the United States in 1832. However his application was refused as he was not an American citizen. Patch continued to improve his propeller and when American laws changed to permit patents by non-citizens, he received an American patent in 1849. Patch's propeller received some recognition, including praise for its efficiency in Scientific American magazine. However, by 1849 there were multiple competing versions of the screw propeller in Europe and America. Patch never received money or recognition.

== Later life and death ==
A petition by Yarmouth citizens to reward his innovation with a pension from the Nova Scotia government in the 1858 was unsuccessful and he died a poor man at Yarmouth in 1861.

== Recognition ==
Although Patch's invention was well documented at the time, his invention was overlooked amidst the many developers of the screw propeller and he has received few tributes. His invention is presented at an exhibit at the Yarmouth County Museum & Archives and a propeller-driven lifeboat in the collection of the Maritime Museum of the Atlantic in Halifax, Nova Scotia is named in his honour. The Propeller Brewing Company in Halifax have promoted John Patch as their mascot and a Pubnico songwriter named Vince d'Entrement wrote a ballad about Patch.
