= Flemingo Liners =

Colombo-Tuticorin Ferry Operator

- Company type: Private
- Industry: Transport
- Founded: 2002
- Headquarters: Dubai, UAE
- Key people: Mahendra Thakker, Rasik Thakker, Sumeet Narang, Atul Ahuja
- Products: Ferries; Port services Passenger transportation Freight transportation
- Website: www.flemingoliners.com

Flemingo Liners is a ferry operator. The company primarily operated the Colombo-Tuticorin ferry service that was reestablished by the governments of India and Sri Lanka and also operates duty-free shops at the passenger terminals in India and Colombo. Its primary vessel is the Scotia Prince.

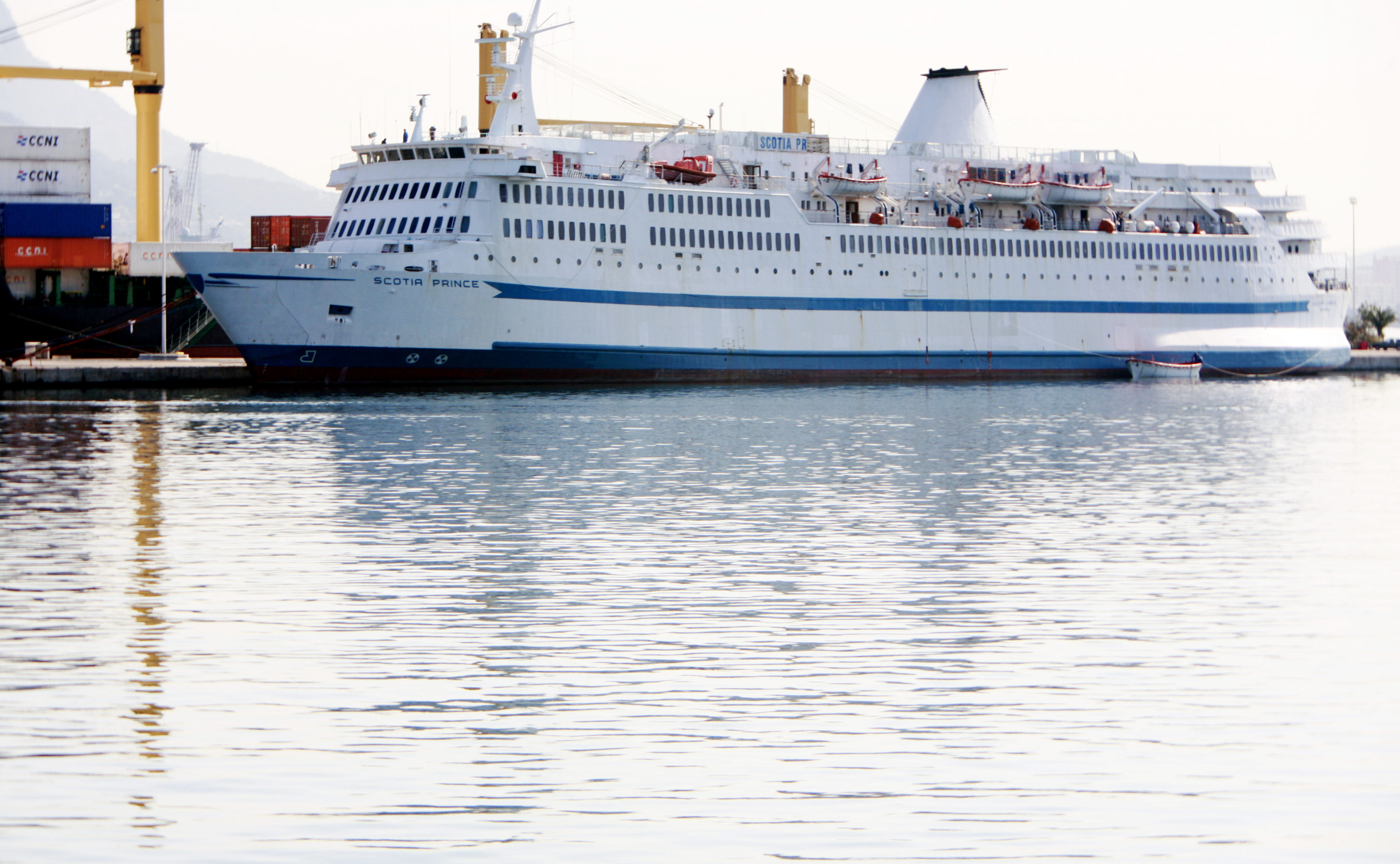
MS Scotia Prince

== Temporary suspension in 2011 ==
The ship was impounded at Colombo Port due to the fact that some Indian companies had outstanding unpaid debts with the company. It is not known when the service will be re-established. Its resumption was discussed by Sri Lanka and India in January 2012. It had become popular among Sri Lankan refugees returning home due to the larger amount of baggage that could be taken on the boat compared to an airline.

== Replacement service ==
On Feb 5 2012, the Ceylon Shipping Corporation said that they have placed advertisements both in India and locally calling for Expressions of Interest from potential replacement operators to revive the halted ferry service between Colombo and Tuticorin.

== See also ==
- Boat mail - original service between India and Sri Lanka
