= Seafest =

Canadian festival

Seafest: A Celebration of Life by the Sea
- Locations: Yarmouth, Nova Scotia, Canada B5A 4K3
- Established: 1979
- Website: www.seafest.ca

Seafest was a 12-day festival in Yarmouth, Nova Scotia. Since 1979 locals and visitors have come together every summer to celebrate the food, culture, and life of our coastal community. For the 2023 calendar year, Seafest took place July 12th to 23rd.

== History ==
Beginning in 1979, Seafest was a unique maritime festival that takes place every July in Yarmouth, Nova Scotia. Having once been under the control of the Yarmouth Development Corporation, Seafest was then run entirely by volunteers. The Canadian Government supported Seafest in the form of funding, and the town's MLA, Zach Churchill, served as an advocate for the festival, having established its importance with Premier Stephen McNeil, published as a Stephen's Pick.

== Signature events ==
Parades on foot, floats, and boats are part of the festival. Other events included a mackerel toss, rum running races, and sea balloons on the wharf in the harbor. The history of Yarmouth was portrayed through many tours throughout the town, along with museum day.

The Classic Car Cruise is a popular event during the festival, usually taking place on the Friday night of the week. This event is hosted by the Roaring 20s Antique Auto club.

== Awards ==
Seafest was nationally recognized through an online poll on canoe.ca as Canada's top Summer Event in 2013. The 2014 poll begun and Seafest won the Nova Scotia Top Summer Event and is heading to the National Poll for a second year in a row. Seafest has also been recognized provincially through the West Jet Fun'N Festival Series. Linda Deveau was also selected for the CTV News at 5 (Maritimes) "Maritimer of the Week" award at the beginning of the 35th Seafest Festival. Named the Best Festival in Nova Scotia by WestJet Fun 'n Festivals Series (2013).

== See also ==
- Culture of Halifax, Nova Scotia
- List of music festivals in Canada
