= Yarmouth, Nova Scotia =

Town in Nova Scotia, Canada

Yarmouth
- Town
- Town of Yarmouth
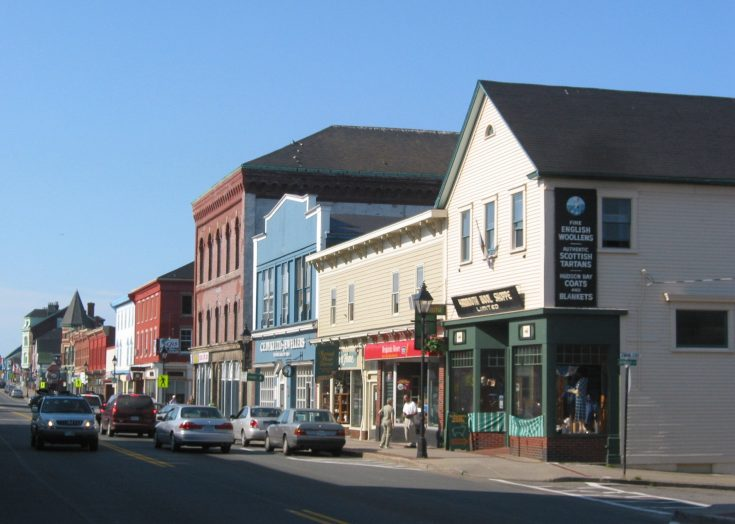
- Main Street in Yarmouth, 2006

- Seal
- Nickname: "The Gateway to Nova Scotia"
- Mottoes: "Progress" "On the Edge of Everywhere"
- Location of Yarmouth, Nova Scotia Yarmouth (Canada)
- Coordinates: 43°50′19″N 66°06′55″W
- Country: Canada
- Province: Nova Scotia
- County: Yarmouth
- Founded: June 9, 1761
- Incorporated: August 6, 1890
- Electoral Districts Federal: Acadie—Annapolis
- Provincial: Yarmouth

Government
  - Type: Town Council
  - Mayor: Pam Mood
  - Deputy Mayor: Steve Berry
  - Councillors: List of Members: Steve Berry; Derek Lesser; Wade Cleveland; Kelly Lacroix-Bishara; Belle Hatfield; Gil Dares
  - MLA: Nick Hilton PC
  - MP: Chris d'Entremont (L)

Area (2021)
  - Land: 10.57 km^{2} (4.08 sq mi)
  - Population Centre: 16.81 km^{2} (6.49 sq mi)
- Highest elevation: 43 m (141 ft)
- Lowest elevation: 0 m (0 ft)

Population (2021)
  - Total: 6,829
  - Density: 646.3/km^{2} (1,674/sq mi)
  - Population Centre: 7,848
  - Population Centre density: 466.8/km^{2} (1,209/sq mi)
- Time zone: UTC−04:00 (AST)
  - Summer (DST): UTC−03:00 (ADT)
- Postal code(s): B5A
- Area code: 902 & 782
- Highways: Hwy 101; Hwy 103; Trunk 1 Trunk 3
- Dwellings: 3569
- Median Income*: $48,000 CDN
- NTS Map: 20O16 Yarmouth
- GNBC Code: CBPIB
- Website: www.townofyarmouth.ca

Yarmouth is a port town in southwestern Nova Scotia, Canada at the entrance to the Gulf of Maine—making it a significant coastal town for maritime activity. Yarmouth is the shire town of Yarmouth County and is the largest population centre in the region.

== History ==
Originally inhabited by the Mi'kmaq, the region was known as "Keespongwitk" meaning "Lands End" due to its position at the tip of the Nova Scotia peninsula.

=== European settlement ===
The region was visited in 1604 by Samuel de Champlain, who named it "Cap-Fourchu", meaning "forked or cloven cape." The first Europeans to make a settlement on these shores were the French Acadians. They set up a small fishing settlement known as "Tebouque" in the mid-1600s and by 1750 the population was 50 people. During the Seven Years' War the New England Planters settled at what is now the town of Yarmouth in 1759; the grantees were from Yarmouth, Massachusetts and they requested that Yarmouth be named after their former home. Yarmouth was founded on June 9, 1761, when a ship carrying three families arrived from Sandwich, Massachusetts. The ship carried the families of Sealed Landers, Ebenezer Ellis, and Moses Perry. During the American Revolution, some in Yarmouth were sympathetic to the rebellion. Following the war, Acadians originally from the Grand-Pré district who returned from exile in 1767 settled in the Yarmouth area.

=== American Revolution ===
There were a number of inhabitants of Yarmouth who supported the American rebels. Despite the American privateer raids in the Raid on Yarmouth, Nova Scotia (1775), the inhabitants still sheltered American prisoners after the Battle off Yarmouth (1777).

After the American Revolution, substantial numbers of United Empire Loyalists arrived in 1785.

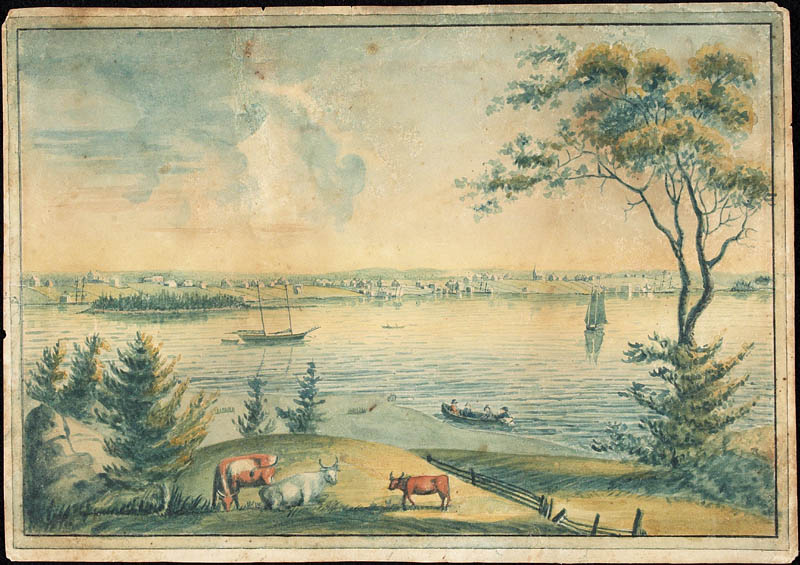
View of Yarmouth from Milton, Nova Scotia, by Sarah Bond Farish, 1829.

=== Shipbuilding ===
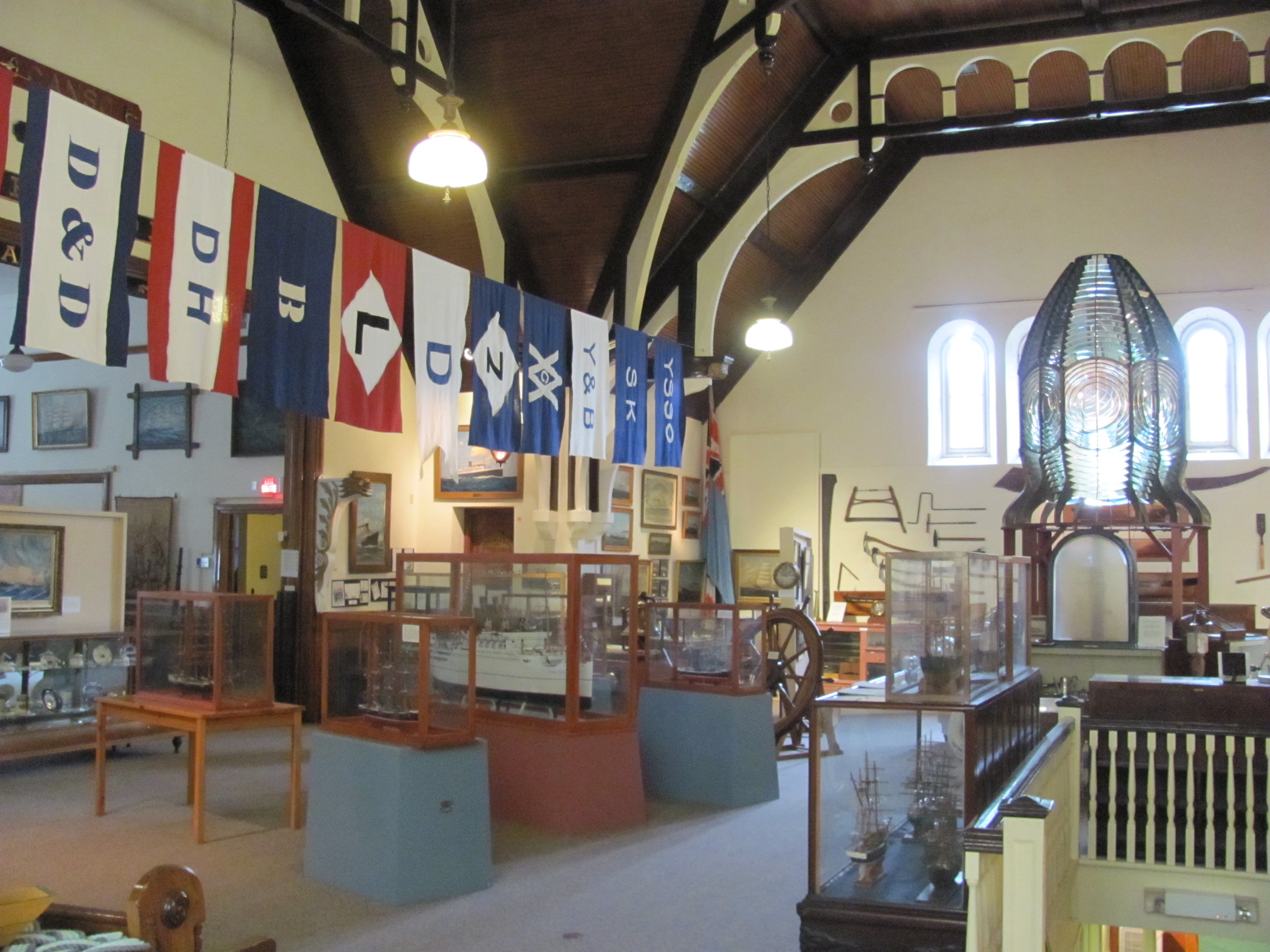
House flags of Yarmouth shipping companies and ship portraits at the Yarmouth County Museum

Through the 19th century, the town was a major shipbuilding centre, at one point boasting more registered tonnage per capita than any other port in the world. From 1874 to 1885, Yarmouth was the second largest port of registry in Canada following Saint John, New Brunswick. In 1878, Yarmouth's tonnage peaked at 453 vessels aggregating 166,623 tons, and in 1879, the town had the second largest registered tonnage in Canada.

Yarmouth ships were found in most major ports throughout the world at this time, including ships noted for courageous crews such as the ship Research in 1861 and ships noted for great size such as the ship County of Yarmouth in 1884, one of the largest wooden hull ships ever built in Canada. John Patch, the son of a Yarmouth sea captain, developed and built one of the first modern screw propeller driven ships in 1832 (4 years before John Ericsson's patent). First demonstrated in Yarmouth Harbour during the summer of 1833, Patch was unsuccessful in a patent application in that year, but he continued to improve his propeller and received an American patent in 1849 which drew praise in American scientific circles. However, by 1849 there were multiple competing versions of the screw propeller. Patch never received money or recognition and died a poor man at Yarmouth in 1861.

The town of Yarmouth was incorporated on August 6, 1890.

=== Railways ===
Yarmouth's waterfront circa 1910 showing the railway and steamship connections which emerged in the late 19th century.

As wooden shipbuilding declined in the late 19th century, Yarmouth's shipowners re-invested their capital into factories, iron-hulled steamships, and railways. The town's first railway was the locally owned Western Counties Railway which was built from Yarmouth to Digby in the 1870s. It eventually was merged into the Dominion Atlantic Railway (DAR), with a network extending into the Annapolis Valley, Halifax and Truro; the DAR later became a subsidiary of Canadian Pacific Railway (CPR). The Halifax and South Western Railway was built along the south shore linking Yarmouth with Shelburne, Liverpool, Bridgewater and Halifax in the early 20th century; the H&SW was eventually merged into the Canadian National Railway (CNR). While iron-hulled steamships had led to the decline of Yarmouth's once-thriving wooden shipbuilding industry, they also made the port a vital connection between Nova Scotia's rail lines and steamships destined for Boston and New York. Rail services were abandoned to Yarmouth in stages, beginning in 1982 (CNR) and ending in 1990 (CPR).

=== Steamships and ferries ===
Tourism has been a major industry in Yarmouth since the 1880s when Loran Ellis Baker founded the Yarmouth Steamship Company. Steamship and railway promotion based in Yarmouth created the first tourism marketing in Nova Scotia. Baker's steamships operated between Yarmouth and Boston until 1900, when the company was purchased by the Dominion Atlantic Railway. The DAR and Halifax and South Western Railway offered connections for passengers arriving in Yarmouth with steamship services operating to New York City and Boston.

In 1939, examiners at Yarmouth's Merchant Marine Institution made seafaring history by issuing master's papers to Molly Kool, the first female ship captain in the Western World.

Steamship connections between Yarmouth and Boston / New York were maintained by Eastern Steamship Lines but were suspended with the start of World War II; the SS Yarmouth Castle was one of many vessels which served this route. The service resumed a few years after the war with the S.S. Yarmouth, under the same company. This service continued into the mid 1950s and was then replaced with the M.V. Bluenose.

==== CNR, CN Marine and Marine Atlantic ====
Following the war, as the economy of western Nova Scotia improved, the need for a year-round daily service was made evident. The service was needed as a more timely route for transport of goods between markets in Nova Scotia and the United States. Demand increased for passenger traffic as well. This led citizens of southwestern Nova Scotia to undertake an extensive lobbying effort with the federal government to establish a ferry service in the Gulf of Maine connecting Yarmouth with a port in New England. In 1949 the Canadian Maritime Commission began to study the possibility of a ferry service connecting with a port in the US. After some controversy as to whether to return to the traditional Boston or New York service, a decision was made to focus the effort on a service from Yarmouth to Bar Harbor, Maine. In 1954, the federal government contracted Davie Shipbuilding to construct MV Bluenose which was launched in 1955 and began service in 1956 under the management of Canadian National Railway (CNR) and later (1977-1982) under the management of a federal Crown corporation named CN Marine.

In 1978 CN Marine started operating MV Marine Evangeline on a service from Yarmouth to Portland, Maine. In 1982 the old Bluenose was retired from the Bar Harbor service and sold. CN Marine replaced her with a newer vessel MV Stena Jutlandica which was renamed MV Bluenose to prevent confusion in tourism marketing literature.

In 1986, CN Marine was reorganized into the Crown corporation Marine Atlantic and in 1997, the federal government decided to end its financial support for the Gulf of Maine ferry service, soliciting proposals from private sector ferry companies to operate the route.

==== Lion Ferry, Prince of Fundy Cruises, Scotia Prince Cruises ====
The growth of post-war automobile-based tourism saw the provincial government encourage additional ferry service with New England, a region with many family connections to the Maritimes dating to the 18th century and which accelerated during the first half of the 20th century. In 1970 the MV Bluenose service operated by CNR was joined by the MS Prince of Fundy on a route connecting Yarmouth with Portland, Maine operated by Lion Ferry. The service was supplemented between 1973 and 1976 by MS Bolero, however by 1976 both vessels were replaced by the MS Caribe. Lion Ferry sold Yarmouth's second ferry service to Prince of Fundy Cruises who purchased MS Stena Olympica and renamed it MS Scotia Prince. The service underwent another ownership change in 2000 and was renamed Scotia Prince Cruises. In 2004 the company discovered toxic mould in its Portland terminal, owned by the City of Portland, cancelling its 2005 season. The City of Portland subsequently cancelled the company's lease and evicted Scotia Prince Cruises, thus ending this ferry service.

==== Bay Ferries ====
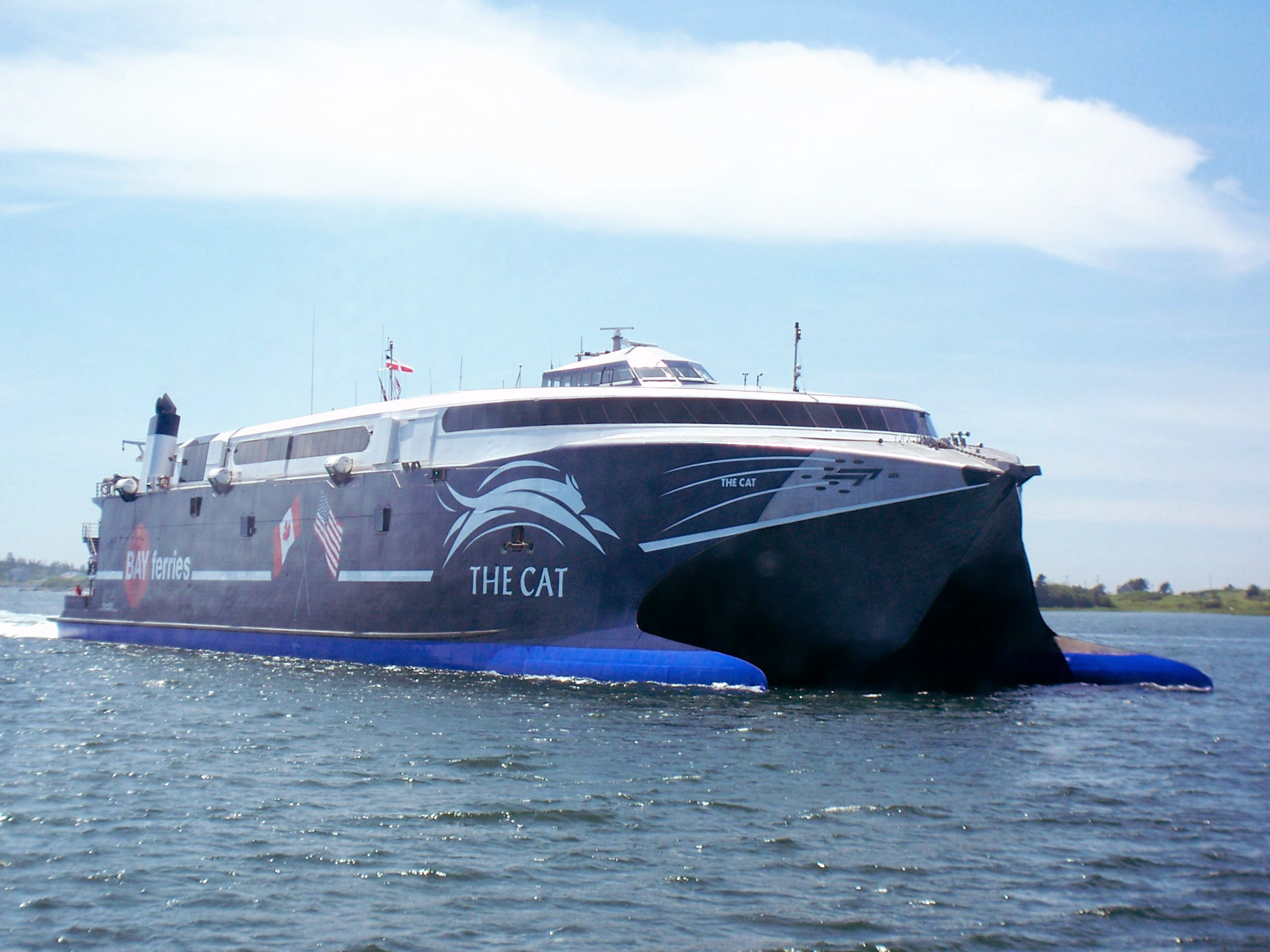
HSC The Cat in Yarmouth Harbour

In 1997 Bay Ferries, a subsidiary of Northumberland Ferries Limited, was the successful bidder for the federal government's Gulf of Maine ferry service. Only the operating licence was transferred as well as the right to be the primary user of the federal government-owned ferry terminals in Yarmouth and Bar Harbor; the service would receive no subsidy from the federal government. Bay Ferries purchased MV Bluenose from Marine Atlantic and used that vessel for the remainder of the 1997 season before selling it.

In 1998, Bay Ferries introduced the first high speed catamaran passenger-vehicle ferry service in North America when it purchased HSC Incat 046 from Incat in an aggressive bid to expand the Yarmouth - Bar Harbor ferry service. Throughout the 1990s the market for ferry services in southwestern Nova Scotia was threatened by significant expansions of 4-lane expressways in northern Nova Scotia and across southern New Brunswick so it was theorized that the Yarmouth - Bar Harbor ferry service could maintain market share if the ferry voyage time was shortened. Marketed as "The Cat", the use of the ferry service grew largely due to Bay Ferries' investment and the novelty of riding the ultra-modern high speed catamaran. In 2002 Bay Ferries traded in HSC Incat 046 for a larger vessel HSC The Cat which was also marketed as "The Cat". Beginning in 2003, Bay Ferries began operating HSC The Cat during the winter months on services in the Caribbean.

Following the end of the service offered by Scotia Prince Cruises in 2004, Bay Ferries began operating HSC The Cat in 2006 between Yarmouth to Portland, in addition to Bar Harbor; the old Portland ferry terminal being replaced by the newly built Ocean Gateway International Marine Passenger Terminal. Following a decline in American tourism to Nova Scotia, as well as record-high fuel prices, Bay Ferries sought subsidies from the federal and provincial governments for its Gulf of Maine ferry service. The federal government refused to provide a subsidy, having removed itself from operating such a service in 1997. However, the provincial government offered a subsidy to cover the operating loss and this was subsequently provided in 2007, 2008 and 2009. In 2009 the provincial government cancelled the subsidy and Bay Ferries announced in December 2009 that it was ending its ferry service and sold the vessel.

==== Nova Star Cruises ====
In 2013 the provincial government posted a request for proposals for re-establishing a Yarmouth - Maine ferry service, stating that a successful proponent would receive a $21 million subsidy over a 7-year period. In September 2013 it was announced that Nova Star Cruises was the successful proponent and in November 2013 it was confirmed that the service would start May 1, 2014, with the MV Nova Star offering daily round trips between Yarmouth and Portland. Nova Star Cruises also announced it was examining the possibility of using the vessel during the winter months on a service between Colombia and Panama, bypassing the Darién Gap. Nova Star's contract to provide ferry services between Yarmouth and Portland was not renewed for 2016.

==== Return of The Cat ====
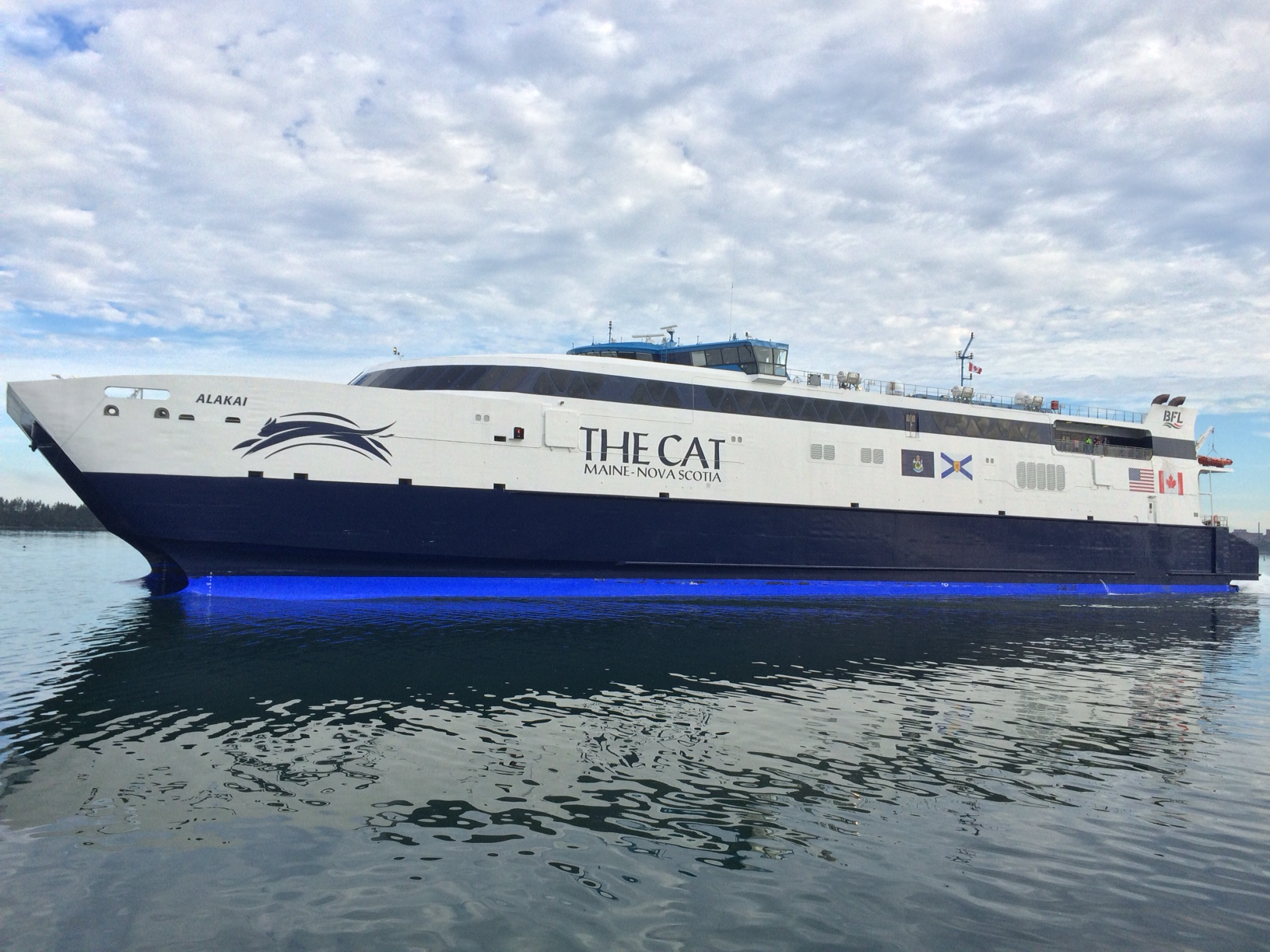
The Cat leaving Yarmouth Harbour in 2016

On March 24, 2016, Bay Ferries Limited announced that it had reached an agreement with the U.S. Maritime Administration and the U.S. Navy for a multi-year charter of HST-2. The vessel will be operated for a passenger/vehicle ferry service in the Gulf of Maine between Portland, Maine and Yarmouth. The service and vessel will be branded as The CAT to align with the previous branding used by Bay Ferries. The vessel underwent a refit at a shipyard in South Carolina and the service began on June 15, 2016.

=== Second World War ===
During the first year of the Second World War, Yarmouth was selected as the location for a British Commonwealth Air Training Plan (BCATP) facility. RCAF Station Yarmouth was originally opened in 1940 as three separate training sites (the East Camp, the West Camp and the Air Base).

The East Camp was home to a detachment of the Royal Air Force's No. 34 Operational Training Unit (from RCAF Station Pennfield Ridge), who trained bomber crews, as well as the Royal Navy's No. 1 Naval Air Gunners School who were located at Yarmouth from January 1, 1943, to March 30, 1945.

The West Camp was home to a Royal Canadian Air Force (RCAF) Anti-Submarine Bomber Reconnaissance Squadron and several Eastern Air Command Bomber Reconnaissance Squadrons, such as 162 Squadron.

The Air Base was home to the 9th Light Anti-Aircraft Artillery, various RCAF and RAF Bomber Squadrons and an Army Co-operation Reconnaissance Flight. Its primary function was as an administrative and logistical support base to the RAF and RCAF squadrons in the area, in addition to providing a Weather Information Section, an Armament Section and a firing range.

A Lockheed Hudson, a light bomber, from Bomber Reconnaissance Squadron 113 in Yarmouth became the first aircraft of the RCAF Eastern Air Command to destroy a submarine, sinking U-754 about 160 km (100 mi) south of Yarmouth on July 31, 1942. The sinking resulted in 43 casualties and no survivors.

Several smaller installations associated with RCAF Station Yarmouth were located in southwestern Nova Scotia, including a bombing range at Port Maitland, a fuel depot at Digby, and radar detachments at Plymouth, Tusket, Bear Point, Port Mouton and Rockville. In 1944, a detachment of the US Navy briefly came to Yarmouth to test the effectiveness of a blimp service. After a crash, the RCAF decided against this venture.

RCAF Station Yarmouth closed in 1945. The airfield was sold to the Department of Transport in 1946 and became the Yarmouth Airport. A Canadian Army training camp (known as Camp 60) on Parade Street also provided basic and artillery training for 20,000 soldiers during the war.

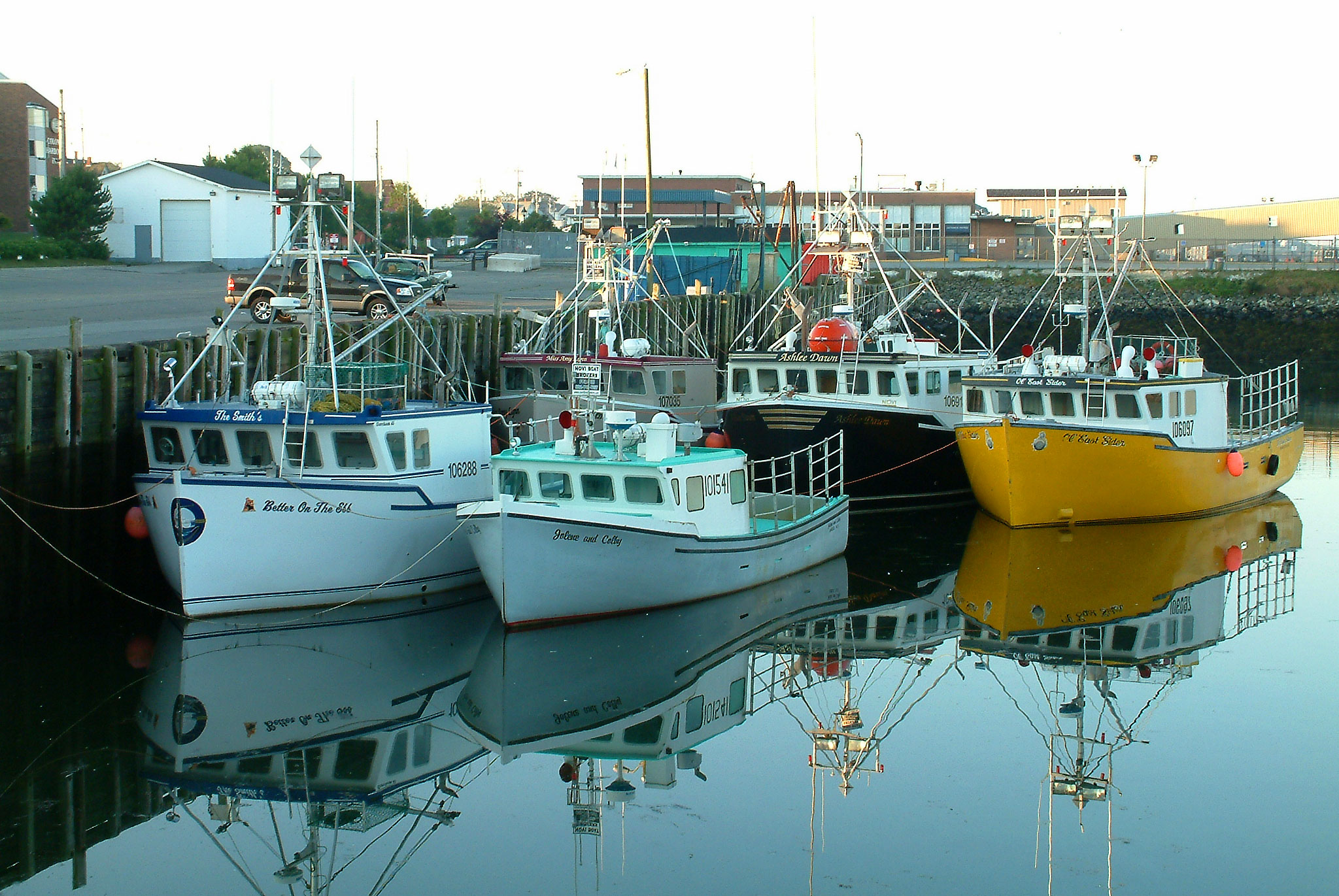
Fishing boats in Yarmouth

== Culture ==
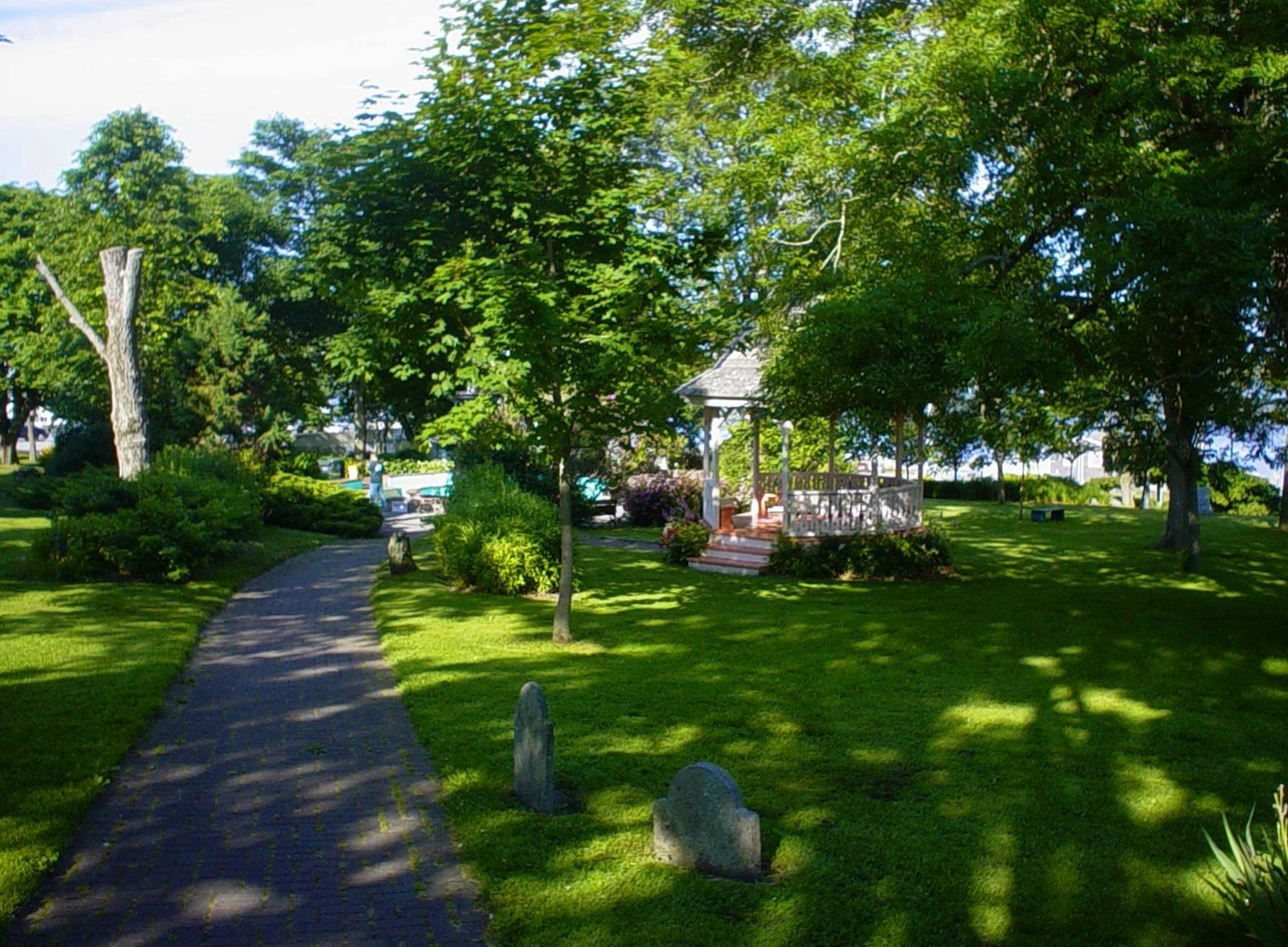
Frost Park in Yarmouth

The town is home to the Yarmouth County Museum & Archives, which preserves the history of the town and surrounding county and operates the Killam Brothers building on the waterfront. The Firefighters' Museum of Nova Scotia, part of the Nova Scotia Museum system is located on Main Street. The privately run Sweeney Fisheries Museum is also located in Yarmouth.

The Izaak Walton Killam Memorial house, founded in 1963, serves as the town's public library. It is the largest branch of Western Counties Regional Library and houses the regional library's headquarters.

The Yarmouth Arts Regional Council was established in 1974, under the leadership of Lydia Davison, a local music teacher. Over the next five years, with the assistance of the Canada Council and many volunteers, the Yarmouth Arts Regional Centre (Th'YARC) was constructed on the site of a former garage on Parade Street. Th'YARC continues to operate to this day, with the 350-seat Lydia Davison Theatre, an art gallery and a print-making shop.

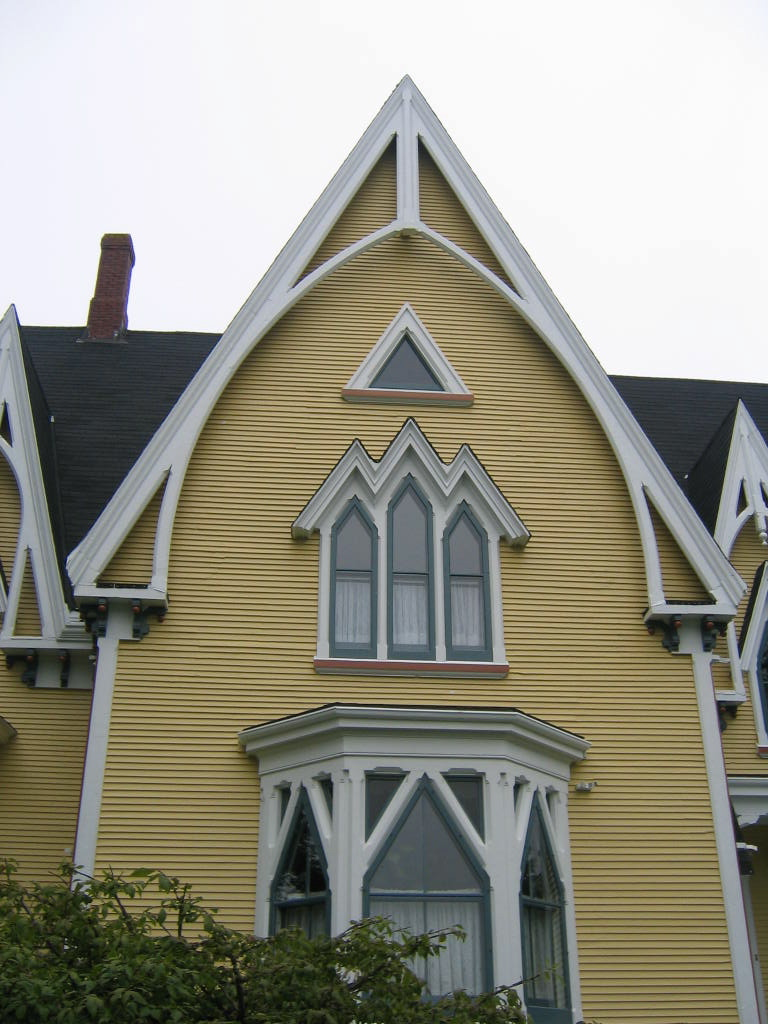
The Victorian Gothic style Eakin / Hatfield House in Yarmouth

A popular but unsupported cultural belief in Yarmouth holds that the American composer Meredith Willson wrote his well-known song "It's Beginning to Look a Lot Like Christmas" while staying in Yarmouth's Grand Hotel.

In August 2004, a record mako shark was caught off the coast of Yarmouth during the Yarmouth Shark Scramble. It weighed 491 kg (1,082 lb) and set a new Canadian record. It is considered one of the largest mako sharks ever caught.

Seafest is an annual 7 day festival organized since 1979.

== Buildings and structures ==
Yarmouth is known for some of the most exuberant examples of Victorian houses in the Maritimes, a legacy of the wealthy captains and shipowners of the town's seafaring Golden Age. A heritage district preserves several blocks of these residences, including the Lovitt House and Eakin/Hatfield House. On the waterfront, two historic warehouses survive from the sailing era, the Killam Brothers and Parker-Eakin's buildings, each with an associated wharf, which are the focal points of summer waterfront events.

Yarmouth's Main Street is marked by several distinctive Victorian commercial buildings such as the turreted Yarmouth Block Building. The largest building in the town is a 1970s hotel, the Rodd Grand Hotel. It is built on the site of the original Grand Hotel, a Second Empire hotel which was the town's landmark for many years.

A landmark for Yarmouth Harbour is the large Cape Forchu Lighthouse which is located a few kilometres away at the headland of Cape Forchu, the peninsula that guards Yarmouth Harbour. The tall "apple core" style is a notable example of modernist style light tower.

== Climate ==
Yarmouth

Climate chart (precipitation, max. and min. temperature)
J	F	M	A	M	J	J	A	S	O	N	D
124 1 −6	103 1 −6	111 4 −3	101 9 1	99 14 6	89 18 10	78 21 13	88 22 13	96 19 11	119 14 6	143 9 2	139 4 −3
- █ Average max. and min. temperatures in °C
- █ Precipitation totals in mm
- Source: Environment and Climate Change Canada
Imperial conversion
J	F	M	A	M	J	J	A	S	O	N	D
4.9 34 20	4 34 21	4.4 39 26	4 48 34	3.9 57 42	3.5 65 50	3.1 71 56	3.5 71 56	3.8 66 51	4.7 56 43	5.6 48 35	5.5 40 27
- █ Average max. and min. temperatures in °F
- █ Precipitation totals in inches

Yarmouth has a humid continental climate (Köppen: Dfb), closely bordering on an oceanic climate (Köppen: Cfb), typical of climates surrounded by the sea but close to large continents such as southern Norway and coastal Hokkaido but with latitude variations. Being near the -3 °C isotherm in the average of the coldest month (east of the city), causing that in peninsular areas like Yarmouth Bar and Cape Forchu are between a transition band for the oceanic climates (Cfb). Winters are cool and rainy with a January average of −2.6 °C (27.3 °F) though owing to strong maritime influences, temperatures below −20 °C (−4 °F) are very rare, and the average high never drops to below freezing at any point in the year. During this period of time, the weather can be unsettled and cloudy due to the Nor'easters coming up the coast from the southwest. As a result, Yarmouth averages only 68–100 hours of sunshine from December to February or 25%–34% of possible sunshine. The average annual snowfall is 204.7 cm (80.6 in), which can come from Nor'easters from the southwest with a maximum snow depth of 9 cm (3.5 in) in January, owing to its mild winters, among the mildest in Canada east of the Rockies.

Yarmouth's summers are cool due to the strong coastal influence from the sea, meaning temperatures above 30 °C (86 °F) are very rare. The average temperature in the warmest month, August, is 17.5 °C (63.5 °F). Spring and fall are transitional seasons in which falls are warmer than springs since the waters are at the warmest temperatures in fall and the coldest during early spring. Precipitation is significant, averaging 1,290.1 mm (50.79 in) a year, with July and August being the driest months on average and November being the wettest month on average. An outstanding feature is Yarmouth's late-fall to early-winter precipitation maximum, owing to the combination of intense storm activity from November to January and relatively more-stable summers, with thunderstorm activity here much less frequent than in the U.S. Northeast, Mid-Atlantic, and points southward. Yarmouth averages 1,898.3 hours of sunshine, or 41.2% of possible sunshine, with summer being the sunniest and winter being the cloudiest. Yarmouth averages 191 days of fog each year.

The highest temperature ever recorded in Yarmouth was 32.5 °C (90.5 °F) on July 16, 2013. The coldest temperature ever recorded was −24.4 °C (−11.9 °F) on February 14, 1894.

Climate data for Yarmouth (Yarmouth Airport) WMO ID: 71603; coordinates 43°49′37″N 66°05′17″W; elevation: 42.9 m (141 ft); 1991–2020 normals, extremes 1870−present (Note: Climate data was recorded in the town of Yarmouth from December 1870 to March 1941 and at Yarmouth Airport from February 1940 to present. Climate data 1991–2020 is a composite recorded at Yarmouth A, Yarmouth RCS (WMO ID: – / 71884; Climate ID: 8206500 / 8206491; coordinates 43°49′51″N 66°05′19″W / 43°49′51″N 66°05′17″W; elevation: 43.0 m (141.1 ft) / 36.0 m (118.1 ft)), and Yarmouth A (WMO ID: 71603; Climate ID: 8206495; coordinates 43°49′37″N 66°05′17″W; elevation: 42.9 m (141 ft)))
Month	Jan	Feb	Mar	Apr	May	Jun	Jul	Aug	Sep	Oct	Nov	Dec	Year
Record high humidex	15.8	16.9	17.4	24.8	27.9	38.0	37.7	37.3	36.4	30.2	26.1	19.5	38.0
Record high °C (°F)	14.0 (57.2)	15.3 (59.5)	18.3 (64.9)	21.2 (70.2)	24.8 (76.6)	30.4 (86.7)	32.5 (90.5)	30.3 (86.5)	27.7 (81.9)	22.8 (73.0)	19.3 (66.7)	16.5 (61.7)	32.5 (90.5)
Mean daily maximum °C (°F)	1.3 (34.3)	1.3 (34.3)	4.0 (39.2)	8.8 (47.8)	13.9 (57.0)	18.1 (64.6)	21.4 (70.5)	21.6 (70.9)	18.8 (65.8)	13.6 (56.5)	9.0 (48.2)	4.4 (39.9)	11.4 (52.5)
Daily mean °C (°F)	−2.6 (27.3)	−2.5 (27.5)	0.4 (32.7)	5.0 (41.0)	9.8 (49.6)	14.0 (57.2)	17.3 (63.1)	17.5 (63.5)	14.7 (58.5)	9.8 (49.6)	5.5 (41.9)	0.8 (33.4)	7.5 (45.5)
Mean daily minimum °C (°F)	−6.4 (20.5)	−6.2 (20.8)	−3.3 (26.1)	1.2 (34.2)	5.7 (42.3)	9.8 (49.6)	13.2 (55.8)	13.4 (56.1)	10.5 (50.9)	6.1 (43.0)	1.9 (35.4)	−2.9 (26.8)	3.6 (38.5)
Record low °C (°F)	−21.3 (−6.3)	−24.4 (−11.9)	−15.7 (3.7)	−10.8 (12.6)	−1.8 (28.8)	2.1 (35.8)	6.4 (43.5)	5.8 (42.4)	1.3 (34.3)	−3.2 (26.2)	−9.8 (14.4)	−16.6 (2.1)	−24.4 (−11.9)
Record low wind chill	−32.6	−32.0	−28.5	−22.5	−4.3	0.0	0.0	0.0	0.0	−6.9	−19.5	−28.2	−32.6
Average precipitation mm (inches)	123.6 (4.87)	102.8 (4.05)	110.7 (4.36)	101.4 (3.99)	99.1 (3.90)	88.7 (3.49)	78.0 (3.07)	88.1 (3.47)	95.9 (3.78)	119.3 (4.70)	143.4 (5.65)	139.1 (5.48)	1,290.1 (50.79)
Average rainfall mm (inches)	69.1 (2.72)	60.0 (2.36)	82.5 (3.25)	92.7 (3.65)	98.5 (3.88)	88.9 (3.50)	81.8 (3.22)	89.8 (3.54)	97.5 (3.84)	124.1 (4.89)	133.8 (5.27)	97.8 (3.85)	1,116.5 (43.96)
Average snowfall cm (inches)	63.6 (25.0)	46.5 (18.3)	30.8 (12.1)	9.5 (3.7)	0.2 (0.1)	0.0 (0.0)	0.0 (0.0)	0.0 (0.0)	0.0 (0.0)	0.4 (0.2)	10.0 (3.9)	43.7 (17.2)	204.7 (80.6)
Average precipitation days (≥ 0.2 mm)	20.5	16.4	14.9	13.9	13.4	11.6	9.9	9.8	10.1	12.1	15.1	19.7	167.2
Average rainy days (≥ 0.2 mm)	8.5	7.0	8.8	12.3	13.3	11.5	10.2	9.7	10.4	11.8	13.4	12.2	128.9
Average snowy days (≥ 0.2 cm)	15.5	12.0	9.0	3.1	0.1	0.0	0.0	0.0	0.0	0.2	3.1	10.2	53.2
Average relative humidity (%) (at 1500 LST)	77.8	74.1	70.3	70.3	73.4	76.7	78.7	77.1	75.4	73.0	74.5	77.3	74.9
Mean monthly sunshine hours	76.0	103.5	141.6	178.8	213.0	217.6	227.6	220.0	186.8	165.6	97.6	70.3	1,898.3
Percentage possible sunshine	26.3	35.0	38.4	44.4	46.7	47.1	48.6	50.8	49.6	48.4	33.5	25.3	41.2
Source: Environment and Climate Change Canada (extreme minimum February 1894) (sun from 1981-2010)

== Demographics ==
Historical population
Year	Pop.	±%
1762	100	—
1871	4,696	+4596.0%
1881	5,324	+13.4%
1889	5,818	+9.3%
1891	6,089	+4.7%
1901	6,430	+5.6%
1911	6,600	+2.6%
1921	7,073	+7.2%
1931	7,055	−0.3%
1941	7,790	+10.4%
1951	8,106	+4.1%
1956	8,095	−0.1%
1961	8,636	+6.7%
1966	8,319	−3.7%
1971	8,519	+2.4%
1976	7,801	−8.4%
1981	7,475	−4.2%
1986	7,617	+1.9%
1991	7,781	+2.2%
1996	7,568	−2.7%
2001	7,561	−0.1%
2006	7,162	−5.3%
2011	6,761	−5.6%
2016	6,518	−3.6%
2021	6,829	+4.8%

In the 2021 Canadian census conducted by Statistics Canada, Yarmouth had a population of 6,829 living in 3,259 of its 3,569 total private dwellings, a change of 4.8% from its 2016 population of 6,518. With a land area of 10.57 km^{2} (4.08 sq mi), it had a population density of 646.1/km^{2} (1,673.3/sq mi) in 2021.

The town has long held the highest teenage pregnancy rate in the province. Many studies have been done using teenagers in the town to examine the phenomenon.

Religion (2021)
Religion	Population	Pct (%)
No religious affiliation	2,705	42.17%
Catholic	1,785	27.82%
Baptist	635	9.90%
Christian [not-stated]	350	5.45%
Anglican	260	4.05%
Pentecostal	165	2.57%
United Church	125	1.95%
Other Christian	110	1.71%
Other religions and spiritual traditions	85	1.32%
Latter Day Saints	50	0.78%
Muslim	50	0.78%
Hindu	25	0.39%
Jehovah's Witness	25	0.39%
Sikh	15	0.23%
Jewish	10	0.16%
Lutheran	10	0.16%
Christian Orthodox	10	0.16%

Income (2021)
Income type	By CAD
Median Total Income	$30,400
Median Household Income	$48,000
Median Economic Family Income	$68,000

Ethnic origins (2021)
Ethnic origin	Population	Pct (%)
English	1,490	22.49%
Canadian	1,145	17.28%
French	1,095	16.53%
Scottish	910	13.74%
Irish	875	13.21%
Acadians	775	11.70%
Métis	595	8.98%
European	310	4.68%
German	345	5.21%
British Isles	240	3.62%
Nova Scotian	210	3.17%
Mi'kmaq	145	2.19%
First Nations (North American Indian)	125	1.89%

Education (2021)
Level of education	Number	Pct (%)
No certificate, diploma, or degree	1,565	27.82%
High school certificate or equivalent	1,620	28.80%
Apprenticeship or trades certificate or diploma	345	6.13%
College, CEGEP or other non-university certificate or diploma	1,205	21.42%
University certificate or diploma below the bachelor level	115	2.04%
Bachelor's degree or higher	780	13.87%

Mother tongue language (2021)
Language	Population	Pct (%)
English	5,890	88.24%
French	435	6.52%
Non-official languages	210	3.15%
English and French	100	1.50%
English and non-official language	35	0.52%
Multiple non-official languages	5	0.07%

Knowledge of official languages (2021)
Language	Population	Pct (%)
English	5,635	84.36%
English and French	1,025	15.34%
Neither English or French	20	0.30%
French only	0	0.00%

== Notable people ==
- Sara Corning (1872–1969), humanitarian, nurse, and orphanage founder during the Greco-Turkish War.
- Amanda Cottreau, folk singer-songwriter
- Ryan Graves, professional hockey player
- Keith R. Porter (1912–1997), pioneer in biological electron microscopy, was born in Yarmouth.
- Paul Smart, sailor and Olympic medalist
- Allie Munroe (born 1997), Canadian professional ice hockey defenceman for the Toronto Sceptres
- Brian MacKay-Lyons (born 1954), architect.

== See also ==
- Yarmouth Stone – Stone with human markings of unknown origin, considered runes in local popular culture
