= Harry Phillips =

Harry Phillips may refer to:

- Harry Phillips (rugby union) (1903–1978), Welsh international rugby union player
- Harry Phillips (judge) (1909–1985), United States federal judge
- Harry Phillips (athlete) (1885–?), South African long-distance runner
- Harry Phillips (Australian footballer) (1867/68–1923), Port Adelaide footballer
- Harry Phillips (footballer, born 1877) (1877–?), English football forward
- Harry Phillips (footballer, born 1997), English football midfielder
- Harry C. J. Phillips (born 1943), political and civic education advocate and political commentator in Western Australia

== See also ==
- Henry Phillips (disambiguation)
