= Yarmouth County Museum & Archives =

Coordinates: 43°50′12.25″N 66°06′56.6″W

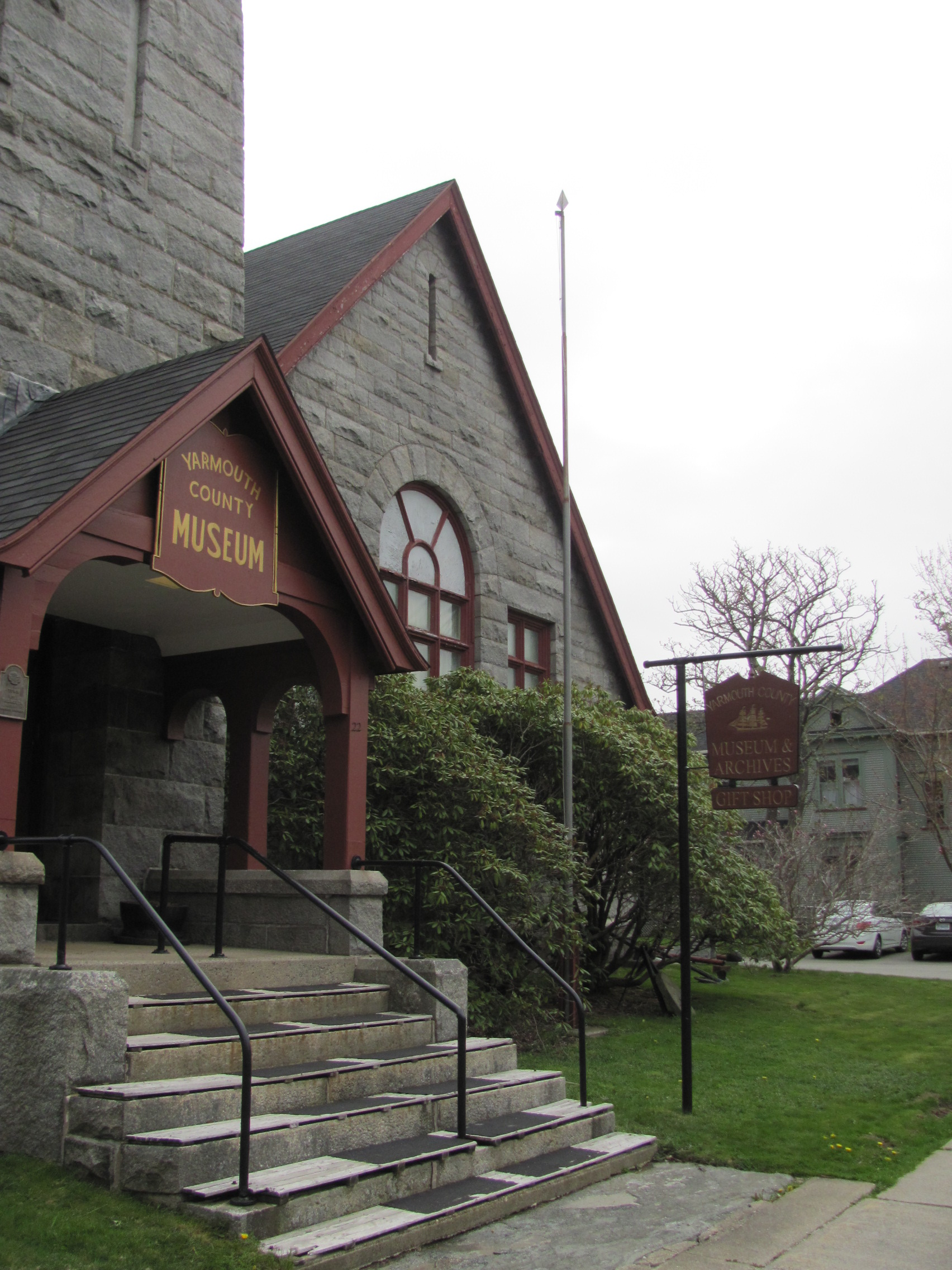
- Established: 1935
- Location: 22 Collins Street; Yarmouth, Nova Scotia; B5A 3C8
- Type: Municipal Museum & Archives
- Director: Nadine Gates
- Website: yarmouthcountymuseum.ca

The Yarmouth County Museum & Archives is a museum located in Yarmouth, Nova Scotia, Canada. This museum explores the history of Yarmouth County. Located in the heart of Yarmouth's heritage residential district, the museum is housed in a former church as well as two historic houses. It also operates a summer display in the restored Killam Brothers Shipping Office on the Yarmouth waterfront.

== History ==
The museum began in 1935 with the creation of the Yarmouth County Historical Society. The society formed the museum in 1958. It moved to its current location in 1969, the former Tabernacle Congregational Church, an 1892 granite church listed on the Canadian Register of Historic Places.

The museum expanded in 2000 incorporating two adjacent historic homes including the Abram Little House with a wing providing climate controlled storage and conservation facilities and an archival research centre. The museum grounds include the Pelton-Fuller house, an 1892 Italianate summer home of Alfred C. Fuller, "the Fuller Brush Man" which was donated to the museum by his widow in 1997 and restored by the museum to showcase its extensive collection of Victorian furniture and costumes. The museum has won numerous awards for exceptional museum and archival work.

== Collection ==
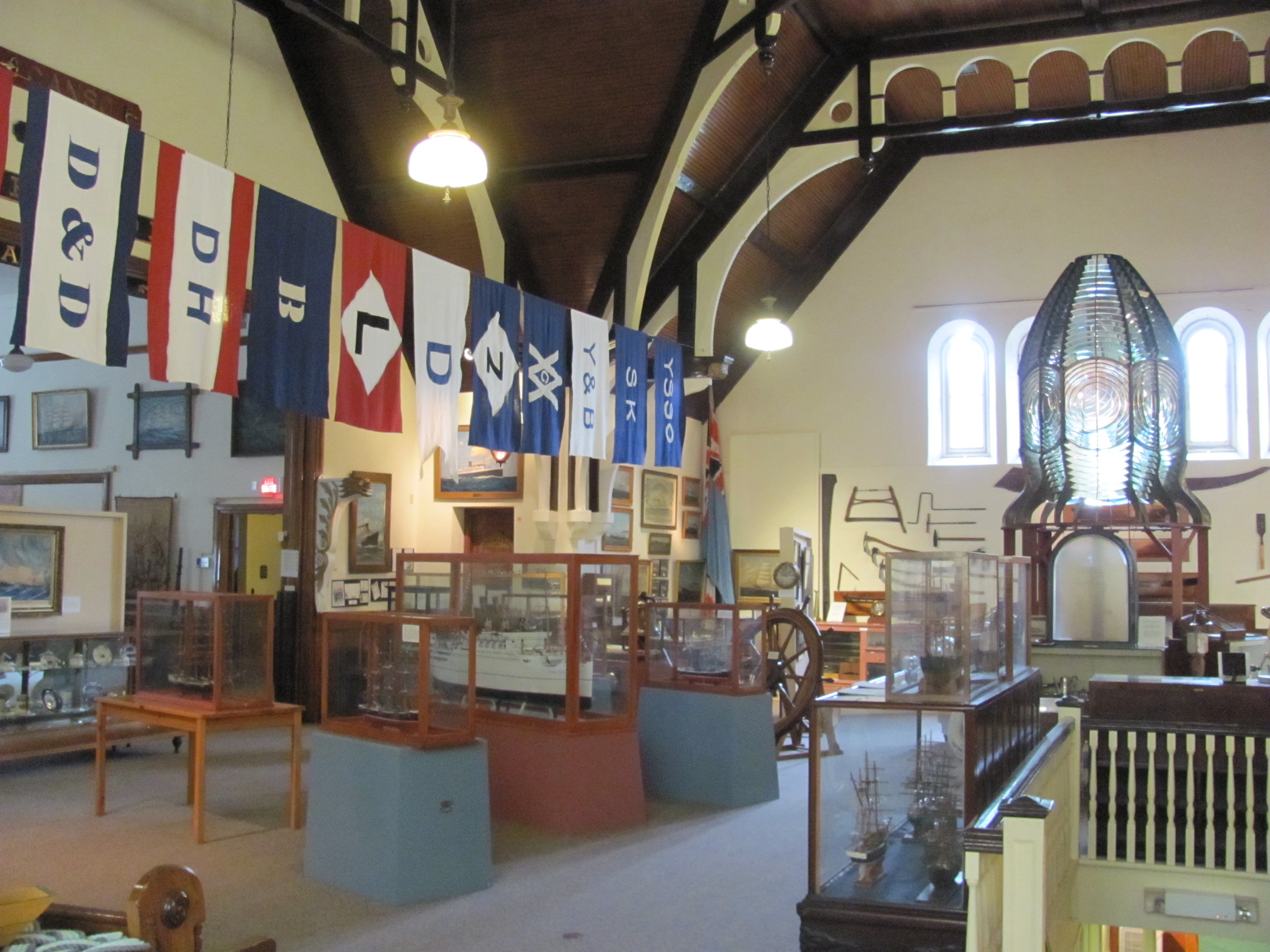
Main Gallery with the Cape Forchu lens, ship portraits and models and Yarmouth shipping house flags

The museum has the third largest collection of marine paintings in all of Canada and the largest community archives in Nova Scotia. The original second order fresnel lens used at the Cape Forchu Lighthouse is displayed in the centre of the museum's main gallery. It was preserved by the society in 1962 when the original 1840 lighthouse was replaced by a new concrete tower. Two stagecoaches are also displayed in the museum, a locally-built example and a well-preserved Concord stagecoach, both used for service between Yarmouth and Tusket, Nova Scotia in the mid-1800s. A special display evoking the bridge of the MV Bluenose features the wheel, compass, telegraph and bell from the long-running Yarmouth ferry.

A circular, metal plaque in the museum collection was constructed by the Canadian Bank of Commerce in memory of its employees who served during the First World War. The plaque was found in the Home Life Building, which had formerly been the Yarmouth branch of the Bank of Commerce Building.

The museum houses the mysterious Yarmouth Runic Stone, one of the best known items of Yarmouth's history, although its actual status as a Norse artifact is very much in dispute.
