= MV Bluenose =

History
- Name: Bluenose
- Namesake: schooner Bluenose
- Owner: Minister of Transport
- Operator: Canadian National Railways (1956–1977); CN Marine (1977–1982)
- Port of registry: Yarmouth
- Route: Gulf of Maine
- Builder: Davie Shipbuilding, Lauzon
- Yard number: 598
- Laid down: July 1954
- Launched: 25 May 1955
- Christened: 1955
- Completed: 1955
- Maiden voyage: 1956
- Out of service: 16 October 1982
- Renamed: Marine Bluenose (1983)
- Identification: Call sign: ?; IMO number: 5046853
- Fate: Sold ca. 1983 to Electric Boat Company, Groton; Scrapped ca. 2000, Tuxpan, Mexico

General characteristics
- Type: ferry
- Tonnage: 6,419 GT, 1,094 DWT
- Length: 346 ft (105 m)
- Beam: 65 ft (20 m)
- Draught: 17 ft (5.2 m)
- Propulsion: 6 Fairbanks-Morse 38 8-1/8 diesel electric engines, 12,000 bhp (8,900 kW)
- Speed: 18.5 kn (34.3 km/h; 21.3 mph)
- Capacity: 615 passengers, 150 automobiles, 18 semi-trailers
- Crew: 96

MV Bluenose was a Canadian passenger and motor vehicle ferry operated by Canadian National Railways and later CN Marine from 1955 to 1982. She sailed between Bar Harbor, Maine and Yarmouth, Nova Scotia. The vessel was named after the famed Grand Banks fishing and racing schooner Bluenose.

== Construction ==
In 1949, the Canadian Maritime Commission began to explore the possibility of investing in the construction of a ferry to connect the port of Yarmouth with a port in Maine. This followed a multi-year lobbying campaign of the federal government conducted by citizens and local political leaders in southwestern Nova Scotia advocating a ferry service to replace steamship connections that were not resumed following the conclusion of the Second World War. The vessel was built by Davie Shipbuilding in Lauzon, Quebec, Canada. Building commenced with the laying of the keel in July 1954. MV Bluenose was launched on 25 May 1955. The ship was christened by its patron Jeanne St. Laurent, wife of Prime Minister Louis St. Laurent, whose government commissioned her construction. Mrs. St. Laurent reportedly christened the ship by saying "I name this ship Bluenose and may God protect all who sail in her."

== Statistics and Livery ==
Bluenose measured 346 ft (105 m) in length, had a beam of 65 ft (20 m) and draught of 17 ft (5.2 m). She measured 6,419 GT. She had the capacity to carry up to 615 passengers. The crew numbered about 96. She could also carry up to 150 automobiles and 18 trucks. Bluenose was propelled by 6 Fairbanks-Morse 38 8-1/8 diesel engines which delivered 12,000 bhp (8,900 kW) to two propellers. Her service speed was about 18.5 kn (34.3 km/h; 21.3 mph). Automobiles and trucks were onloaded and offloaded through four large hatches, two on either side of the ship. On the promenade deck, Bluenose had an observation lounge forward and a cafeteria aft. Single berth cabins could accommodate up to 30 passengers.

Bluenose had a blue hull and white superstructure. Her funnel was emblazoned with several different designs, initially with red, white and blue stripes, at one point red with a white CN (Canadian National Railway) logo, at other points blue with a white CN logo, and finally with a blue funnel with white CN Marine logo.

== Service ==
For her entire career as a ferry, Bluenose ran between Bar Harbor, Maine and Yarmouth, Nova Scotia. Operations commenced in 1956. Her last run occurred on 16 October 1982. She provided remarkably reliable performance throughout her 26 years of service. Those who took this ferry across the Gulf of Maine saved a driving distance of approximately 700 mi (1,100 km). Daily service occurred over the warmer months. Tri-weekly service was offered during other periods, although, during the late 1970s and early 1980s, service was discontinued over the winter months.

In 1982, Bluenose was replaced by a newer vessel, the 1973-built MS Stena Jutlandica, which was renamed MV Bluenose before entering service. This second MV Bluenose was retired from service in October 1997.

== Disposition ==
The Electric Boat Company of Groton, Connecticut, purchased Bluenose in 1983 through the Government of Canada's Crown assets disposal process. She was renamed MV Marine Bluenose, and was converted into a floating machine shop on the Thames River in Groton. In 1984 a dispute developed between the owners of the ship and Groton city officials, who claimed that the vessel was a building and was required to meet state building codes. In October 1996, Marine Bluenose was towed from the Electric Boat Company’s facilities in Groton. Thereafter, she spent several years in an advanced state of decay in Tampa Bay, Florida, moored alongside the idled Chandris liner RHMS Britanis (ex-SS Monterey). Marine Bluenose was towed from Tampa Bay to Tuxpan, Mexico for scrapping in 2000.

== Commemoration ==
The wheel, compass, telegraph and bell from the bridge of MV Bluenose were donated to the Yarmouth County Museum by the Electric Boat Company. They are featured along with a model of the ship in a special display at the Museum which evokes the bridge of Bluenose.
