= Henry Phillips (author) =

American numismatist and translator

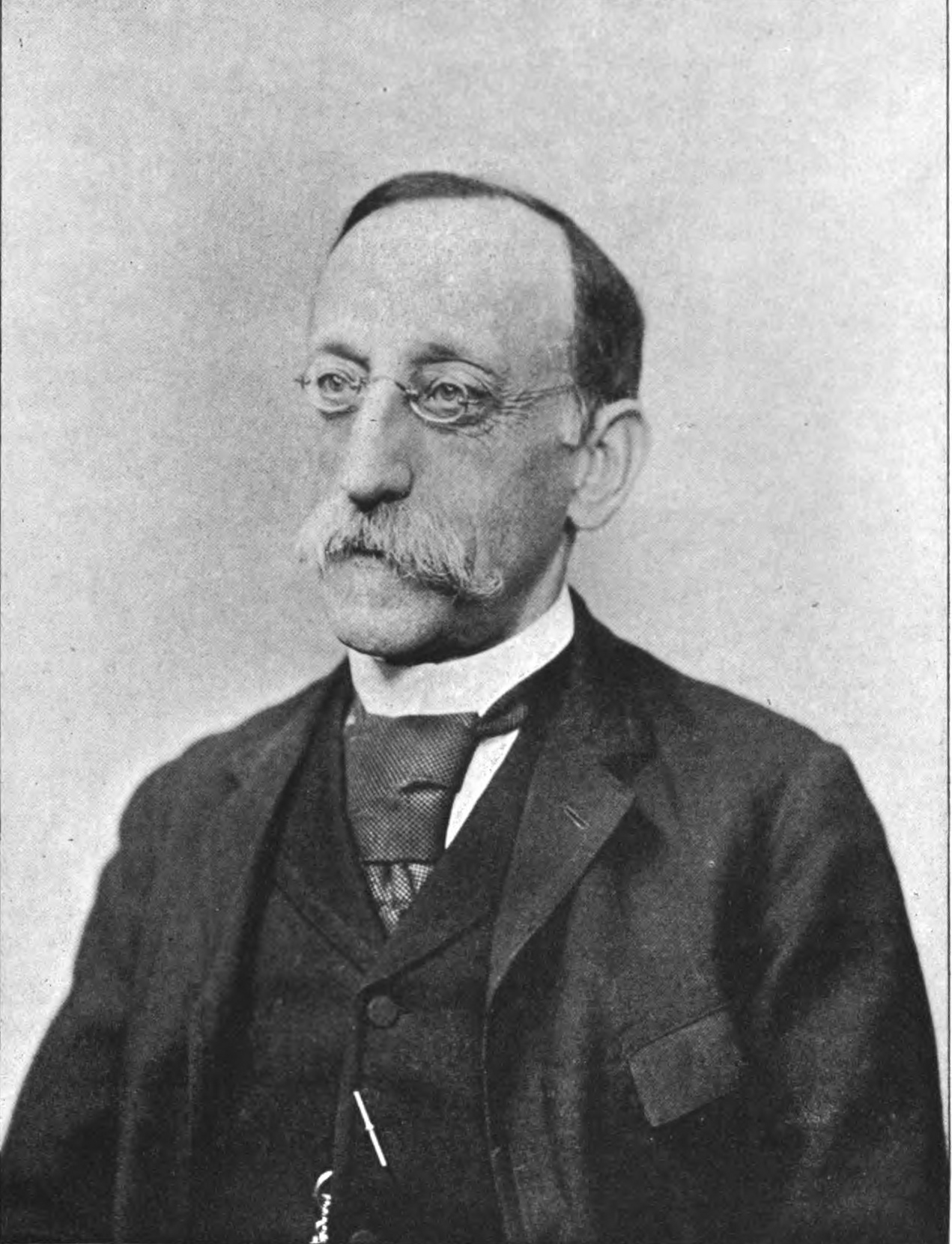
- Born: September 6, 1838; Philadelphia
- Died: June 6, 1895
- Occupations: Numismatist, translator, librarian, writer
- Father: Jonas Altamont Phillips

Henry Phillips (September 6, 1838 – June 6, 1895) was an American numismatist and translator. He was born and died in Philadelphia.

== Biography ==
He was educated at a Quaker elementary school, a classical academy and the University of Pennsylvania, graduating from the latter in 1856. He then studied law, and was admitted to the Philadelphia bar, but, owing to delicate health, was never able to follow his profession actively. In 1862 he became treasurer, and in 1868 secretary, of the Numismatic and Antiquarian Society of Philadelphia, and after 1880 he was secretary of the American Philosophical Society, and after 1885 its librarian. He was also a member of many learned societies.

== Works ==
His works on the paper currency of the American colonies and on American continental money were the first on those subjects, and the latter volume was cited in the opinion of the U. S. Supreme Court in a decision on legal tender cases. Phillips published, besides many papers:

- History of American Colonial Paper Currency (Albany, 1865)
- History of American Continental Paper Money (1866)
- Pleasures of Numismatic Science (Philadelphia, 1867)
- Poems from the Spanish and German (1878)
- Chamisso's Faust (1881)
- Four volumes of translations from the Spanish, Hungarian, and German (1884–1887)
