= List of University of Arizona people =

The following is a list of notable people associated with the University of Arizona. Alumni include a former U.S. secretary of the interior, a former U.S. surgeon general, five U.S. senators, two Republican U.S. presidential nominees, the creator of the television series Sesame Street and founder of Sesame Workshop, the owner of the Los Angeles Angels of Anaheim Major League Baseball team, and several NASA astronauts.

== Administrators ==
=== List of presidents ===
The following persons served as president of University of Arizona:

No.	Portrait	President	Term start	Term end	Refs.
1		Theodore B. Comstock	1894	1895	
2		Howard Billman	1895	1897	
3		Millard Mayhew Parker	1897	1901	
4		Frank Yale Adams	1901	1903	
5		Kendric Charles Babcock	1903	1910	
Acting		Andrew Ellicott Douglass	December 20, 1910	March 10, 1911	
6		Arthur Herbert Wilde	1911	1914	
7		Rufus Bernhard von KleinSmid	1914	1921	
Acting		Francis Cummins Lockwood	April 1922	April 1922	
8		Cloyd Heck Marvin	1922	1927	
9		Byron Cummings	1927	1928	
10		Homer LeRoy Shantz	1928	1936	
11		Paul Steere Burgess	1936	1937	
12		Alfred Atkinson	1937	1947	
13		James Byron McCormick	1947	1951	
14		Richard Anderson Harvill	1951	1971	
15		John Paul Schaefer	1971	1982	
16		Henry Koffler	1982	1991	
17		Manuel Trinidad Pacheco	1991	July 31, 1997	
Interim		Paul S. Sypherd	August 1, 1997	September 30, 1997	
18		Peter Likins	October 1, 1997	June 20, 2006	
19		Robert Neal Shelton	July 1, 2006	July 31, 2011	
20 (Note: interim president)		Eugene G. Sander	August 1, 2011	June 30, 2012	
21		Ann Weaver Hart	July 1, 2012	May 31, 2017	
22		Robert C. Robbins	June 1, 2017	September 30, 2024	
23		Suresh Garimella	October 1, 2024	present	

Table notes:

== Notable alumni and former students ==
=== Academia ===
- Alejandro Aceves (PhD 1988) – professor of mathematics at Southern Methodist University
- Martin Z. Bazant (BS 1992, MS 1993) – E. G. Roos (1944) Chair Professor of Chemical Engineering, Massachusetts Institute of Technology (MIT)
- Raymond S. Brandes – professor of history and archeology, University of San Diego
- Noam Chomsky – UA Laureate Professor of Linguistics, Agnese Nelms Haury Chair
- James C. Cox – Noah Langdale Jr. Chair in Economics at Georgia State University
- Lee Giles (PhD 1981) – computer scientist, co-creator of CiteSeer, David Reese Professor of Information Sciences and Technology, Pennsylvania State University
- Ghanim Al-Jumaily (MS 1983) – professor of engineering, Southern New Hampshire University; former Iraqi diplomat
- Alan C. Newell – UA Regents Professor of Mathematics
- Ed Renwick (1968) – political scientist and television commentator in New Orleans, Louisiana
- Shauna Shapiro – professor of psychology, Santa Clara University
- Laurene Simms (PhD 2000) – educator and hearing advocate, chief bilingual officer at Gallaudet University
- David Soren (1983) – UA Regents Professor of Classics and director of the Orvieto Institute in Umbria
- Gordon Willey (BS 1935, MS 1936) – pioneer of processual archaeology, Harvard University professor
- Vladimir E. Zakharov – UA Regents Professor Emeritus of Mathematics

=== Arts and media ===
- Agha Shahid Ali – poet
- Samaire Armstrong – actress
- Denise Austin – fitness instructor
- Michael Biehn (1974) – actor, Aliens, Terminator
- Lynn Borden (1959) – actress and Miss Arizona (1957)
- Jerry Bruckheimer (1965) – film and television producer
- Jos Charles – poet
- Tom Chilton – MMORPG game developer
- Fred Christenson – television executive
- Jaime Clarke – novelist and editor
- Robert D. Cocke – artist
- Joan Ganz Cooney – creator of Sesame Street
- Ann Cummins – novelist and short story writer
- Ted DeGrazia – painter, sculptor
- Louis Delsarte – artist
- Alex Flanagan – sports journalist
- George Gray – game show host and announcer
- Savannah Guthrie – co-host of The Today Show
- Earl Hindman – actor, Wilson W. Wilson, Home Improvement
- Louis Hock – independent filmmaker
- Rick Hoffman – actor
- John Hughes – film director, producer, screenwriter
- Daniel Humbarger – stand-up comedian
- J.A. Jance – mystery writer
- Nicole Randall Johnson – actress and comedian
- Kourtney Kardashian – television personality
- Kitty Kelley – author
- Barbara Kingsolver (1981, MS Biology) – author
- Greg Kinnear (1985) – actor
- Don Knotts – actor
- Aline Kominsky-Crumb (BFA) – underground comic book creator
- Tamika Lawrence – actress and singer
- Jerry Livingston – songwriter
- Daniel Mac – internet personality
- Harvey Mason Jr. – music and film producer
- Linda McCartney – photographer
- Emily McDonald – neurologist and media personality
- James McMurtry – musician
- Dipti Mehta – actress
- Paul Moyer (1964) – Los Angeles television journalist
- Peter Murrieta – 2-time Emmy Award-winning producer and writer, Wizards of Waverly Place
- Craig T. Nelson (1969) – actor
- Lynne Olson – author and journalist
- Katie Pavlich – media
- Brian Ralston – film score composer
- Caroline Rhea – actress and comedian
- Nicole Richie – actress
- Geraldo Rivera (1965) – talk show host, television journalist
- Linda Ronstadt – 11-time Grammy Award-winning singer
- Richard Russo – Pulitzer Prize winner for his novel Empire Falls
- Rico Saccani – conductor
- Fritz Scholder – late Native American artist
- Garry Shandling – late actor and comedian
- Ron Shelton – film screenwriter and director
- Richard Siken (MFA 1994) – poet
- Stephen Spinella – actor
- Barret Swatek – actress
- Jimmy Tatro – actor
- Brandon Tatum – conservative commentator
- Vicki Lewis Thompson – author
- Jonathan Van Ness – television and media personality
- Jack Wagner (1982) – actor
- David Foster Wallace – author
- Kate Walsh – actress
- Kristen Wiig – actress, Saturday Night Live cast member
- Christine Woods – actress

=== Business ===
- Max Cutler – podcaster and entrepreneur, founder of Parcast
- Karl Eller – business leader, namesake of the Eller College of Management
- Rande Gerber – owner of Midnight Oil Bars and other nightlife businesses
- William M. Grace (MBA 1959) – real estate developer and casino owner
- R. Alexandra Keith (born 1967–1968) – head of Procter & Gamble's global beauty business
- Colette Kress – CFO of Nvidia
- Terry Lundgren – CEO of Federated Department Stores, namesake of the Terry Lundgren Center for Retailing at the university
- Arturo Moreno – owner of the Los Angeles Angels of Anaheim Major League Baseball team, outdoor advertising entrepreneur
- Robert Sarver – managing partner and majority owner of the Phoenix Suns basketball team, director of SkyWest Airlines
- Lisa Song Sutton – entrepreneur

=== Law, politics, and government ===
- Cisco Aguilar – 18th secretary of state of Nevada
- Gilbert Baker – Arkansas state senator
- Ron Barber (BA 1967) – U.S. representative
- Betsey Bayless (1966) – Arizona secretary of state 1997–2003
- Stacy Brenner – Democratic member of the Maine State Senate (2020-)
- Jeffrey S. Buchanan (1982) – lieutenant general, United States Army
- Richard Carmona (MPH 1998) – former U.S. Surgeon General
- Raul Hector Castro (JD 1949) – former governor of Arizona and ambassador to Argentina
- Gabriella Cázares-Kelly (BA) – Pima County, Arizona recorder 2021–present
- Richard Harvey Chambers (BA 1929) – chief judge of the United States Court of Appeals for the Ninth Circuit (1959–1976)
- Eugenia Charles-Newton (2009) – member of the Navajo Nation Council
- Joseph V. Cuffari (BS 1984) – inspector general of the Department of Homeland Security
- Frank L. Culin Jr. (BS 1915, MS 1916) – U.S. Army major general
- Hayzel Burton Daniels (BA 1939, MA 1941) – first African-American member of the Arizona House of Representatives
- Dennis DeConcini (BA 1959, LLD 1963) – former U.S. senator from Arizona (1977–1995)
- David Dewhurst (BA 1967) – lieutenant governor of Texas
- Bob Dole – former U.S. senator and 1996 Republican US presidential nominee
- Paul Fannin – former governor of Arizona (1955–1965) and U.S. senator (1965–1977)
- Samuel Pearson Goddard, Jr. (JD 1949) – former governor of Arizona (1965–1967)
- Barry Goldwater – former U.S. senator (1953–1965, 1969–1987) and 1964 Republican U.S. presidential nominee
- Howard Hart – Central Intelligence Agency officer
- Carole Hillard (BA 1957) – former lieutenant governor of South Dakota
- Tom Hughes (MA 1967) – former mayor of Hillsboro, Oregon
- Richard Hunziker – U.S. Air Force major general
- Robert Wood Johnson IV – U.S. ambassador to United Kingdom
- Neal Justin – member of the Arizona House of Representatives
- Jon Kyl (BA 1964, JD 1966) – former U.S. representative (1987–1995) and former U.S. senator (1995–2013, 2018)
- Bill Kimball – Arizona state senator (1941–1955)
- Richard Kimball – Arizona state senator (1979–1983), member of the Arizona Corporation Commission (1983–1985) and founder of Vote Smart
- Lorna E. Lockwood (BA 1923, JD 1925) – chief justice of the Arizona Supreme Court
- Julianne Murray – chair of the Delaware Republican Party and acting United States attorney for the District of Delaware
- Edna G. Parker (BA 1953) – United States Tax Court judge
- Robert K. Phillips – San Francisco trial attorney
- Steve Soboroff – Los Angeles police commissioner and former CEO of Playa Vista; former Los Angeles Parks commissioner
- Nora Sun (BA 1978) – Chinese-American diplomat, granddaughter of Sun Yatsen
- Opal Tometi – co-founder of Black Lives Matter
- Morris K. Udall (JD 1949) – former fifteen-term U.S. congressman
- Stewart Udall (JD 1948) – former U.S. congressman, former secretary of the interior
- Evan Wallach (BA 1973) – judge, United States Court of Appeals for the Federal Circuit
- Annie Dodge Wauneka – activist and former Navajo Nation Council member

=== Religion ===
- Spencer W. Kimball – former president of the Church of Jesus Christ of Latter-day Saints
- David Roseberry – Anglican priest and founder of Christ Church Plano
- Frederick Wedge – Presbyterian pastor and educator, professional boxer

=== Science and technology ===
- Joseph M. Acaba (MS, 1992) – NASA astronaut
- Daniel W. Bradley (PhD) – co-discoverer of Hepatitis C
- Amanda M. Fanniff (Ph.D., 2009) – clinical psychologist
- Sarah Hörst – professor of Planetary Sciences at Johns Hopkins University
- Steve Maguire (BS, ?) – software engineer
- Andreas Gerasimos Michalitsianos (BS, 1968) – NASA astrophysicist who contributed to the International Ultraviolet Explorer and the Hubble Space Telescope
- Don Pettit (Ph.D., 1983) – NASA astronaut
- Elisabetta Pierazzo (Ph.D., 1997) – PSI senior researcher
- Jane H. Rider (BS, 1911) – first female civil engineer in Arizona, state director of hospital surveys
- Brian Schmidt (BS, 1989) – physicist awarded the 2011 Nobel Prize in Physics
- Richard Scobee (BS, 1965) – NASA astronaut
- Christine Siddoway (M.Sc., 1987) – geologist and Antarctic researcher
- Kathryn Stephenson (BA, 1936) – first American female board-certified plastic surgeon
- Mary Stiner – professor of anthropology, curator of zooarchaeology at the Arizona State Museum
- Clifford Stoll (Ph.D., 1980) – astronomer
- Paul Wehrle (BS, ca. 1943) – pediatrician who helped develop vaccines for polio and smallpox

=== Sports ===
- Abdihakem Abdirahman (BA, 2001) – long-distance runner and Olympian
- Hassan Adams (BA, 2006) – NBA player
- James Akinjo – basketball player in the Israeli Basketball Premier League
- Rawle Alkins – professional basketball player
- Kadeem Allen (born 1993) – professional basketball player
- Brian N. Anderson (2003) – MLB center fielder
- Gilbert Arenas (2001) – NBA player
- Deandre Ayton – NBA player
- Marisa Baena – LPGA golfer
- Bob Baffert (1977) – Thoroughbred race horse trainer
- Adia Barnes (1998) – former WNBA player
- Ricky Barnes – PGA Tour golfer and 2002 U.S. Amateur Champion
- Brigetta Barrett (2013) – Olympic silver medalist in the high jump
- Jason Bates – former Major League Baseball infielder
- Michael Bates – NFL player and Olympic sprinter
- Amanda Beard (2003) – swimmer, Olympic gold medalist and 2-time American Swimmer of the Year
- Mike Bell – NFL running back
- Kathryn Bertine (2000) – professional racing cyclist
- Mike Bibby – NBA point guard
- Monica Bisordi (2006) – gymnastics
- Erica Blasberg (1984–2010) – LPGA golfer
- Cheri Blauwet (2002) – wheelchair racing, Para-olympic gold medalist
- Steve Boadway – NFL player
- Lance Briggs – NFL linebacker
- Tedy Bruschi (1996) – NFL linebacker, analyst for ESPN
- Jaden Bradley – NBA player
- Copeland Bryan (BA, 2006) – NFL player
- Brayden Burries – NBA player
- Chase Budinger – NBA player
- Kurt Busch (1996) – NASCAR driver (attended but did not graduate)
- Will Bynum – NBA player
- Ka'Deem Carey – NFL running back
- Antoine Cason – NFL player, Jim Thorpe Award winner
- Jenna Daniels – professional golfer
- Jack Davis – American Football League football player
- George DiCarlo – Olympic gold medal swimmer
- Sean Elliott – NBA player, number retired by the University of Arizona
- Scott Erickson – Major League Baseball pitcher
- Maryse Éwanjé-Épée (1985) – track and field athlete in the high jump and heptathlon
- Jennie Finch – Olympic women's softball pitcher
- Nick Foles – NFL quarterback, Super Bowl LII MVP
- Nick Folk – NFL kicker
- Terry Francona – MLB player and manager
- Brenda Frese – college basketball head coach
- Channing Frye – former NBA player
- Jim Furyk – PGA Tour golfer and 2003 U.S. Open winner
- Robert Gamez – PGA Tour golfer
- Aaron Gordon – NBA player
- Josh Green – NBA player
- Rob Gronkowski – NFL tight end
- Natalie Gulbis – LPGA golfer
- Chip Hale – Major League Baseball player and coach
- Gavin Harlien – off-road and stock car racing driver
- Herman Harris – NBA player
- Keith Hartwig – former NFL player
- Ron Hassey – Major League Baseball player and coach
- Chris Henry – NFL player
- Derek Hill – NFL player
- Ed Hochuli – NFL referee
- Trevor Hoffman – MLB pitcher
- Alicia Hollowell – national champion softball pitcher
- Jack Howell – Major League Baseball player
- Nick Hundley – MLB player
- Andre Iguodala – NBA player, NBA Finals MVP
- Don Janicki – track and field athlete
- Richard Jefferson – former NBA player, analyst
- Chase Jeter (BA 2018, MA 2020) – basketball player
- Jay John – college basketball head coach
- Keshon Johnson – NFL player
- Stanley Johnson – NBA player
- Vance Johnson – NFL player
- Steve Kerr – NBA player, manager and head coach
- Scott Kingery – Major League Baseball player
- Spencer Larsen – NFL linebacker
- Rod Lewis – NFL player
- Warren Livingston – NFL player
- Kenny Lofton – Major League Baseball player
- Mark Lyons – professional basketball player
- Nico Mannion – professional basketball player
- Lauri Markkanen – NBA player
- Bennedict Mathurin – NBA player
- Stan Mataele – NFL player
- Chris McAlister – NFL cornerback
- Jonathan Meloan – Major League Baseball player
- Frank Middleton – NFL football player
- Josh Miller – NFL punter
- Ryk Neethling – Olympic swimmer
- Dennis Northcutt – NFL wide receiver
- Lorena Ochoa – Hall of Fame LPGA golfer
- Josh Pastner – college basketball head coach
- Antonio Pierce – NFL linebacker
- Todd Pletcher (1989) – Thoroughbred trainer; 3-time Eclipse Award winner
- Dan Pohl – PGA golfer
- DaShon Polk – NFL linebacker
- Don Pooley – PGA golfer
- Sean Rooks – NBA player
- Rory Sabbatini – PGA Tour golfer
- César Salazar – MLB catcher
- David Schipper – professional soccer player
- Paul Shields – NFL player
- Kobi Simmons – professional basketball player
- Justin Simon – professional basketball player
- J.T. Snow – MLB player, Golden Glove winner
- Annika Sörenstam – Hall of Fame LPGA golfer
- Mike Springer – PGA golfer
- Ed Stokes – professional basketball player
- Damon Stoudamire – NBA player
- Salim Stoudamire (2005) – NBA player
- Kaleb Tarczewski – basketball player
- Jason Terry – NBA player
- Ron Theobald – Major League Baseball player
- Tom Tolbert – NBA player; NBA broadcast analyst
- Mark Tollefsen – professional basketball player
- Allonzo Trier – NBA player
- Sione Tuihalamaka – Arena Football League player
- Amy Van Dyken – Olympic gold medalist swimmer
- Bobby Wade – NFL wide receiver
- Luke Walton – NBA player and head coach
- Ray Wells – NFL player
- Brian Williams – NBA player
- Derrick Williams – NBA basketball player
- Rodney Williams – NFL football player
- Michael Wright – professional basketball player
- Gabe York – professional basketball player
- Joe Young – NFL defensive end

=== Other ===
- Laurie Dann – murderer
- Allison Feldman – murder victim, namesake of Study Abroad Scholarship

== Notable faculty and staff ==
- Alfred Atkinson – president, Montana State University (1920–1937) and University of Arizona (1937–1947)
- Gail Lee Bernstein – historian, one of the pioneers of Japanese women's studies
- Nicolaas Bloembergen – Nobel laureate in Physics, 1981
- Bart Bok – astronomer
- Mike Candrea – Hall of Fame softball coach
- Andrew Carnie – linguist
- Aurore Chabot – professor of Ceramic Art
- David Chalmers – philosopher specializing in philosophy of mind
- Hsinchun Chen – McClelland Professor of Management Information Systems; founder of the Artificial Intelligence Lab
- Karletta Chief – environmental scientist
- Noam Chomsky – Laureate Professor of Linguistics
- Cedric Dempsey – executive director of the NCAA, 1993–2002
- William G. Dever – biblical archaeologist
- Xiaohui Fan – astronomer and cosmologist
- Hermann Flaschka – mathematics professor, winner of 1995 Norbert Wiener Prize in Applied Mathematics
- Frances Gillmor – folklorist, scholar, and novelist
- Kenneth L. Hale – linguist and polyglot
- Harry Harlow – experimental psychologist
- Eva Simone Hayward – author and researcher in Gender and Women's Studies
- Jenann Ismael – philosopher
- Jennie R. Joe (Navajo), medical anthropologist
- Rich Jorgensen – professor of plant sciences, editor of The Plant Cell
- Samara Klar – political scientist, founder of Women Also Know Stuff
- Gerard P. Kuiper – astronomer, discovered various moons of Jovian planets and the Kuiper Belt
- Willis Lamb – Nobel laureate in Physics, 1955
- Keith Lehrer – philosophy professor, member of the American Academy of Arts and Sciences
- Fang Lizhi – physicist, helped inspire China's 1989 Pro-Democracy Movement
- Andy Lopez – baseball coach
- Eugene Mackaben – artist
- Fulvio Melia – astrophysicist
- Robert Miller – director, School of Architecture
- Charles Newman – mathematics professor, now at the Courant Institute
- Shaun Nichols – philosopher
- Peter K. Norquest – linguist
- Antxon Olarrea – professor of linguistics
- Lute Olson – hall of fame basketball coach
- Feryal Özel – astrophysicist
- Johann Rafelski – professor of (theoretical) physics
- Julia Rebeil – professor of music 1920–1969
- Peter M. Rhee – medical school professor and surgeon
- Aric Rindfleisch – marketing author and professor, now at the University of Illinois Urbana-Champaign
- Rich Rodriguez – football coach
- Jerzy W. Rozenblit – Raymond J. Oglethorpe Endowed Chair in the Department of Electrical and Computer Engineering (ECE)
- John P. Rutherfoord – experimental particle physicist, Regents Professor, US ATLAS experiment Lifetime Achievement award, High Energy and Particle Physics Prize of the European Physical Society
- Adam Showman – planetary scientist and professor at the Lunar and Planetary Laboratory
- Vernon L. Smith – economics professor, Nobel laureate in Economics, 2002
- Daniel L. Stein – mathematics and physics professor, head of physics department
- Bruce Tabashnik – entomologist
- Andrew Weil – pioneer in integrative medicine
- Peter Wild – poet, author, and professor of English (1940–2009)
- Arthur Winfree – theoretical biologist, winner of 2000 Norbert Wiener Prize in Applied Mathematics
- Ralph Walter Graystone Wyckoff – professor of microbiology and physics, did pioneering work in X-ray crystallography
- Vladimir E. Zakharov – Regents' Professor of mathematics, winner of 2003 Dirac Prize
