= Rosenbluth =

Rosenbluth is a German ornamental surname, which means "rose bloom", from the Middle High German rosenbluota. Variants of the name include Rosenblith, Rosenblut, Rosenblüth, and Rosenblueth. The name may refer to:

- Eric Rosenblith (1920–2010), American violinist
- Felix Rosenblüth (1887–1978), Israeli politician
- Jerzy W. Rozenblit (born 1956), American electrical engineer
- Jorge Rosenblut (born 1952), Chilean engineer
- Lennie Rosenbluth (1933–2022), American basketball player
- Marshall Rosenbluth (1927–2003), American physicist
- Marty Rosenbluth (born 1960), American lawyer and civil rights activist
- Walter A. Rosenblith (1913–2002), American biophysicist

== See also ==
- Rosenbaum
- Rosenblatt
- Rosenblum
