= Philip Roberts (disambiguation) =

Philip Roberts (born 1994), is an Irish footballer. Philip or Phillip Roberts may also refer to:

- Phil Roberts (born 1950), Bristol Rovers and Portsmouth player of the 1970s
- Philip Roberts (British Army officer) (1906–1997), senior officer of the British Army
- Phillip Waipuldanya Roberts (1922–1988), Australian traditional doctor, activist and government adviser

== See also ==
- Robert Phillips (disambiguation)
