= Herbert Phillips =

Herbert Phillips or Philips may refer to:

- Herbert Philips (died 1905), British philanthropist and justice of the peace
- Herbert Phillips (diplomat) (1878–1957), British diplomat in China
- Herbert Phillips (athlete) (1883–1977), South African athlete
- Herbie Phillips (1935–1995), American jazz trumpeter, composer, and arranger

== See also ==
- Bert Phillips (disambiguation)
