= Stiner =

Stiner is a surname. Notable people with the surname include:

- Carl Stiner (1936-2022), United States Army general
- Lon Stiner (1903–1985), American football player and coach
- Mary Stiner, American professor

== See also ==
- Shiner (surname)
