= Manchester Women's Christian Temperance Association =

The British Women's Temperance Association (BWTA) was founded in Newcastle in April 1876 following the National Convention of the International Order of Good Templars. The Manchester Women's Christian Temperance Association (MWCTA) was founded earlier in the same year but remained independent of the BWTA until in 1886 and even then retained its own name.

In the last quarter of the 19th century the philanthropic MWCTA worked for social improvement, particularly amongst the working classes. The association was popular with middle-class ladies and they expanded their branches into Lancashire and Cheshire, with social gatherings entertained by music and recitations, where several girls expressed a desire to sign the pledge.

== Goals ==
The main concerns for the MWCTA during this period were:

- The work of the Police Courts Mission (PCM) and the establishment of a Reformatory for Inebriate Women.
- An enabling change to the Habitual Drunkards Act 1879.
- The appointment of police matrons at police stations for female prisoners.
- Stricter enforcement of the licensing laws and the conditions within the ‘Palace of Varieties’ and similar music halls.
- The selling of drink and the treating by sweets to children under 17 years at the back door of pubs and beer houses.
- The provision of public drinking fountains.

== Police Courts Mission ==
The MWCTA became directly linked with the Police Courts Mission as it pursued the goal of a Reformatory for Inebriate Women and Police Matrons for female prisoners within the inner-city police stations. The PCM believed that ‘Intemperance is the root and cause of crime’. Present at the Manchester Minshull Street Court from 1879 it had by 1886 assisted over ‘3,000 women and girls who have had kindly words and offers of help given to them’ along with over 7,000 temperance pledges taken.

== Intemperance and the police ==
The English police records for the period reveal that from 1860 to 1876 there was a dramatic increase in cases of drunkenness (and subsequent imprisonment) which accounted for over half of all crime in London and one which Harrison (1971) summarised as ‘the product of a particular socio-economic structure’

Within Manchester a similar picture emerged. By 1876, out of the total number of persons arrested and charged, a third were females and 61% of those were drunk upon arrest (65% of male arrests). Drunkenness accounted for just under a half of all cases charged. The final quarter of the century saw a slow reduction in drunkenness. By 1892 within Manchester the total cases of drunkenness had fallen to 24% of those arrested and summonsed for all offences.

Manchester's PCM records stated that of 294 women seen in 1886 nearly 100 were drunk or had attempted suicide under the influence of strong drink. By 1890 the number of detained females had risen to 493. Relevant offences being larceny (theft), accosting (forceful begging), drunk and accosting, drunk and incapable, sleeping out and attempted suicide.

== Fledgling probation service ==
McWilliams (1983) presents the missionaries of the PCM as the forerunners of the modern probation service, as they laboured to turn around and restore to moral and physical health, those women and girls they encountered. In 1889 the missionary at the Manchester Police Court restored 169 girls to their parents, 13 to places of service, 11 to the workhouses four to hospital and ‘others to various houses’ often out of Manchester and harm's way. They were often able to persuade the magistrates to pay for the expenses incurred. Only 30 females had gone onto the penitentiary that year which had been established to reform prostitutes.

The MWCTA stated that the use of imprisonment for the treatment of inebriate women was counter productive. By way of punishment for drunkenness the law provided for a fine of 21 shillings (£1.05) or a sentence of 28 days on default of payment. As the offender had often no means to pay, repeated terms of imprisonment was the inevitable result for habitual drunkards. In 1901 the Manchester City Police (MCP) recorded that out of 341 such offenders 93 had been arrested more than 20 times with one drunkard arrested for their 158th time.

== Reformatory for Inebriate Women. ==
By December 1888 the MWCTA had lobbied for a change in the Habitual Drunkards Act 1879 and the Manchester Guardian reported a proposal, endorsed by Sir William Houldsworth, and submitted to the Home Secretary for ‘fresh legislation and the ability of magistrates to commit inebriates to a reformatory and the cost be defrayed from the rates, subscriptions and payments by the inmates’.

A penny pamphlet published in 1889 by the MWCTA and PCM entitled 'Civilisation and the Drink Traffic - A plea for the establishment of an Inebriate Home' invited the cooperation and donations of a benevolent public. It stated that,

‘If powers of justices were extended to allow the commitment of ‘habitual drunkards’ for longer periods, than an utterly futile month, and commit for six months instead of six [committals] for one month, this would give time to throw off the stupor of chronic drunkenness’.

The Habitual Drunkards Act 1879 did allow authorities to establish a retreat for inebriates but payment by the inmate was required, thus excluding those working-class drunkards most at risk and with the least financial support. The MWCTA proposed state funding coupled with charitable donations and patient payments where possible.

In October 1889 it was reported in the Manchester Guardian that Herbert Philips Esq., J.P. of Sutton Oaks Macclesfield had presided over a PCM meeting at the YMCA on Peter Street and reported that £700 had been raised and a home at Ash Lodge, Halliwell Lane, Cheetham was being negotiated. He suggested that what was needed was to commit habitual offender to such homes for a period of one to three years. (Note: He had offered the sum of £200 if a further £600 could be raised within six months. He further stated that under the Habitual Drunkards Act a person could sign away their liberty for up to 12 months.)

At the AGM of the MWCTA in April 1890 it was reported that Herbert Philips Esq., J.P. had bought a house, namely ‘The Grove’ on Egerton Road, Fallowfield and had leased it to the committee on nominal terms. It was within walking distance of the city but far enough away to reduce temptation. This retreat was opened in July 1890 and by February 1891 the MWCTA claimed it was the largest licensed retreat of its kind in England providing beds for 21 patients. (Note: This would later rise to 25 patients)

The Grove was situated in a desirable middle-class suburb noted for its beautiful grounds and bright and healthful surroundings and availability of skilful medical help. (Note: A mile outside the City limits of Manchester until 1904.) In 1895, The Grove reported 128 applicants with 24 admissions of whom 23 had left after a year. They claimed a rising success rate, of 4 ‘standing fast’ in 1891 to 9 persons by 1893 which they deemed

‘a wonder they do considering the temptations that surrounds them and the allurements of the liquor trade’.

Inspected once a year by the State, they claimed to enforce,

‘simple methods of immediate abstinence from strong drink and the strict regularity of life with constant and cheerful employment of gentle firmness and unfailing sympathy coupled to a religious influence always present and often directly urged'.

By 1919, The Grove had closed along with all such certified reformatories by 1921. Although suitable for reformable generally middle-class women the reformatories were ill-suited for the alcoholic or mentally ill patients often from the working-classes who, were regarded by some as having, ‘sabotaged or subverted the system’. Only a small number of inmates could be reformed for the costs involved and the homes were regarded as a distraction from the main aims of the temperance associations to introduce new and strengthen existing temperance legislation. The Grove was demolished in the 20th Century and a block of modern flats occupies the ground at 5 Egerton Road Fallowfield, Manchester. 'Fallowfield House’ listed in the trade directory as standing on the corner of 1 Egerton Road and 289 Wilmslow Road is now the Friendship Inn Public House.

== Inebriates Act 1898 ==
The work of the MWCTA along with the general Temperance Movement was effective in persuading Parliament regarding the treatment of inebriates with the passing of the Inebriates Act 1898. This act enabled the provision of government funded council or privately owned, ‘State Inebriate Reformatories’ where habitual drunkards on sentence of the Crown Court could be confined for up to three years in lieu of any other sentence. The act also enabled the same confinement for those convicted of four counts of drunkenness in the lower courts.

== Bibliography ==
- Barrow, M. (1999). Temperate feminists: the British Women's Temperance Association 1870-1914 (Ph.D thesis). Manchester University.
- Eustance, C.; Ryan, J.; Ugolini, L., eds. (2000). A Suffrage Reader: Charting Directions in British Suffrage History. London: Leicester University Press.
- Greater Manchester County Records Office with Manchester Archive, Manchester Women's Christian Temperance Association and Police Courts Mission, Executive minutes GB127, M286.1
- Greater Manchester County Records Office with Manchester Archive, The Grove Retreat in the Manchester Women's Christian Temperance Association Committee minutes GB127, M286.2
- Greater Manchester Police Museum and Archive, ‘Chief Constable Reports from 1874-1900'.
- James, G. (2009). The Big Book Of City. Halifax: James Ward.
- Lublin E. D. Reforming Japan: The Woman’s Christian Temperance Union in the Meiji Period, (Vancouver: UBC Press, 2010).
- McWilliams, W.‘The Mission to the Police Courts, 1876-1936’, The Howard Journal,22, (1983). pp. 129–147.
- Niessen, O. C. Aristocracy, Temperance and Social reform : the life of Lady Henry Somerset, Library of Victorian studies, (London : Tauris Academic Studies 2007).
- Slater's Manchester and Salford Trade Directories 1890-1910.
- Swindells, T. Manchester Streets and Manchester Men, (Manchester, J.E. Cornish Ltd 1908) 3rd Series pp 55–64,
- The Health Journal: and Record of Sanitary Engineering, 4 (1886/7) pp. 40–42
- Tyrrell, I. R. Woman’s World/ Woman’s Empire: The Woman’s Christian Temperance Union in International Perspective 1880-1930, (North Carolina: University of North Carolina Press, 1991)
- Warner, J. On Wit, Irony, and Living With Imperfection, American Journal of Public Health. 98. 5 (2008). pp. 814–822.
- Wilson, G.B. (1940). Alcohol and the Nation. London: Nicholson & Watson.
