= Robert Phillips =

Robert, Rob, or Bob Phillips or Philips may refer to:

== Arts and entertainment ==
- Robert Phillips (actor) (1925-2018), American actor
- Robert Phillips (poet) (1938–2022), American poet and professor of English
- Bob Phillips (born 1951), American television journalist
- Robert Phillips (guitarist) (born 1953), American classical guitarist

== Politics and law ==
- Robert Needham Philips (1815–1890), British Member of Parliament for Bury
- Robert Phillips (politician) (born 1956), American state legislator in Rhode Island
- Robert K. Phillips, American trial attorney

== Science and medicine ==
- Robert Allan Phillips (1906–1976), American physician and research scientist during World War II
- Rob B. Phillips (fl. 2000s–present), American biophysicist

== Others ==
- Robert Edwin Phillips (1895–1968), English army officer, recipient of the Victoria Cross
- Bob Phillips (basketball) (1917–1992), American basketball player
- Robert L. Phillips (born 1955), American technology executive, founder of Nomis Solutions
- Robert Allen Phillips (born 1968), American professor of management

== See also ==
- Bert Phillips (disambiguation)
- Sir Robert Phelips (c. 1586–1638), English Member of Parliament
- Robert Phillip (died 1647), Scottish Roman Catholic priest
