= Elizabeth Sisco =

American artist

Elizabeth Sisco (born 1954 in Cheverly, Maryland, United States) is an artist active in the Chicano art movement.

== Biography ==
She moved to San Diego as an adult and has created art there since.

== Art ==
Sisco creates art about immigration, tourism, and citizenship, particularly about the Chicano experience in the United States and life on the border between San Diego and California. Her work is held at the Smithsonian American Art Museum, the Nelson Atkins Museum, the Los Angeles County Museum of Art, and other museums. She has also published works in journals.

Beginning in 1978, she started a documentary photography project about life and immigration along the border.

In 1991, Sisco staged a protest when part of her work that criticized American tourists was removed from the exhibition "Los Vecinos/The Neighbors" at the Tijuana Cultural Center. The artwork "Double Vision," which depicts American tourists who get photographed with donkeys on the streets of Tijuana, was reinstalled in its entirety.

== "Welcome to America’s Finest Tourist Plantation" (1988) ==
Sisco's most famous work, "Welcome to America’s Finest Tourist Plantation," was a screen print collaboration with David Avalos and Louis Hock. It depicts hands scraping food from a plate, hands in handcuffs near a gun, and a hand, with towels folded over the arm, knocking on a hotel room door. The three artists describe the work as addressing "the role of undocumented workers in San Diego's tourist-based economy."

“Welcome to America’s Finest Tourist Plantation" appears in red across the center of the print. "America's Finest City" was a slogan created by Mayor Pete Wilson after San Diego was rejected as the site of the 1972 Republican National Convention; Wilson declared that the week of the convention would be "America's Finest City Week." When "Plantation" replaces "City," one scholar notes that this "suggest[s] a slave economy that fuels the city's growth."

In January 1988, the three displayed 100 copies of poster in the advertisement space on public buses in San Diego, while the city was hosting Super Bowl XXII, sparking controversy. Part of the controversy came from the fact that the artists used a city grant.

Sisco herself said of the project:

It is no secret to anyone living in San Diego that the tourist industry employs undocumented labor, but to circulate this fact at the time when San Diego was gearing up to host the Super Bowl was blasphemous ... The back of the buses became a wonderful mobile gallery, a mobile wall to move our art throughout the community. And that mobility moved from the back of the buses into the press, onto the television, onto the beaches where surfers debated the project, and into elementary schools and college classrooms.

As one journalist noted, "The artists set out to publicize the plight of undocumented migrant workers, and they used the theater of the real world very effectively to achieve that goal. ... Art’s right to free expression prevailed, even at the risk of alienating Super Bowl patrons and losing tourist dollars."

The project developed further into several billboards, ads, and mixed media installations documenting the work.

In 1989, the three artists created a billboard with a similar slogan. It showed Martin Luther King Jr. and asked "Welcome to America's finest a) city b) tourist plantation c) Convention Center." The San Diego City Council declined to rename the city's convention center after King. This was funded by a grant from the Installation Gallery; the San Diego City Council then denied the gallery tax funds, but restored some of the funds after community pressure. It sparked controversy on a national scale because it used money from federal grants, including an National Endownment of the Arts (NEA) grant, to purchase commercial advertising for political purposes. The NEA decided that the work did not contravene the terms of the grant.

In 1990, the three bought ads on bus benches about police brutality, with the question "AMERICA'S FINEST?"

== "Art Rebate/Arte Reembolso" (1993) ==
In 1993, Sisco, David Avalos and Louis Hock created the installation artwork "Art Rebate/Arte Reembolso." In the installation, Sisco, Avalos, and Hock handed out ten-dollar bills from a NEA grant to, in the artists' words, "undocumented taxpayers" in North San Diego County. The work was commissioned for the Museum of Contemporary Art, San Diego, and Centro Cultural de la Raza.

== Selected works ==
- Documentary photographs on border life, 1978-1980s.
  - Exhibited in "Making Communities: Art and the Border," at University of California, San Diego, University Art Gallery and SME Visual Arts Gallery, UC San Diego.
- With David Avalos and Louis Hock, “Welcome to America’s Finest Tourist Plantation," 1988, screenprint on vinyl mounted on foam board.
  - First exhibition in January 1988 on public buses in San Diego.
  - A book of the project was self-published and is held in various university libraries.
  - "¡Printing the Revolution! The Rise and Impact of Chicano Graphics, 1965 to Now" at the Smithsonian Museum of American Art in 2020.
- "Double Vision," installation of text, photographs, and sculptures; exhibited in "Los Vecinos/The Neighbors" at Museum of Photographic Arts in San Diego (1989) and the Tijuana Cultural Center (1991).
- With David Avalos and Louis Hock, "Art Rebate/Arte Reembolso," collaborative public art event (July–September 1993), commissioned for "La Frontera/The Border, Art about the Mexico/United States Border Experience," at the Centro Cultural de la Raza and the Museum of Contemporary Art, San Diego.
  - "Art Rebate/Arte Reembolso," Mixed media including video, 2007. In the collection of the Los Angeles County Museum of Art.
- "Flashcards," installation consisting of text and photographs; exhibited in 2016 in "The Uses of Photography: Art, Politics and the Reinvention of a Medium" at Museum of Contemporary Art San Diego.
