= Bert Phillips (disambiguation) =

Bert Geer Phillips (1868–1956) was an American artist.

Bert Phillips may also refer to:

- Bert Phillips, radio host on Town Hall Party
- Bert Phillips, character played by Joan Van Ark

== See also ==
- Albert Phillips (disambiguation)
- Robert Phillips (disambiguation)
- Herbert Phillips (disambiguation)
- Hubert Phillips, economist and author
- Bertram Phillips, film director
