= Shauna Shapiro =

American psychologist

- Born: June 15, 1974 (age 52)
- Education: Duke University; University of Arizona; VA Palo Alto Health Care System
- Scientific career
- Fields: Mindfulness; Mindfulness-based cognitive therapy Clinical Psychology
- Workplaces: Santa Clara University; Institute of Transpersonal Psychology

Shauna L. Shapiro is a professor of psychology at Santa Clara University who works on mindfulness.

== Education ==
Shapiro graduated summa cum laude from Duke University, and received a Ph.D. in Clinical Psychology from the University of Arizona. She completed a postdoctoral fellowship at the VA Palo Alto Health Care System She has received training in mindfulness-based cognitive therapy and mindfulness based stress reduction, as well as studied mindfulness meditation in monasteries in Nepal and Thailand.

== Academic career ==
Shapiro is a speaker, author and tenured professor at Santa Clara University's graduate department of Counseling Psychology. Shapiro is also faculty at the Esalen Institute, and adjunct faculty at Andrew Weil's Program of Integrative Medicine at the University of Arizona Medical Center (2000-2004).

=== Publications ===
Shapiro has published over 150 peer-reviewed journal articles and book chapters. In addition, Shapiro is the co-author (with Linda E. Carlson) of the 2009 book, The Art and Science of Mindfulness: Integrating Mindfulness into Psychology and the Helping Professions, and co-author (with Chris White) of the 2014 book, Mindful Discipline: A Loving Approach to Setting Limits and Raising an Emotionally Intelligent Child.
