= Rosenblueth =

Rosenblueth is a surname that can refer to:

- Arturo Rosenblueth (1900–1970), Mexican researcher, physician and physiologist
- Emilio Rosenblueth (1926–1994), Mexican engineer

== See also ==
- Rosenbluth, a surname
