= Albert Phillips =

Albert Phil(l)ips may refer to:

- Buz Phillips (Albert Abernathy Phillips, 1904–1964), Major League Baseball pitcher
- Albert L. Phillips (1824–1893), Wisconsin politician
- Al Phillips (1920–1999), English boxer
- Albert Phillips (politician); see Political party strength in Connecticut

== See also ==
- Bert Phillips (disambiguation)
