= Eugene Mackaben =

American artist

- Born: 1920; Chicago, Illinois
- Died: January 31, 1984 (aged 63–64); Tucson, Arizona

Eugene Henry Mackaben (June 28, 1920 – January 3, 1984) was a prominent figure in the development of regional Post-WWII American Southwest modern art. His education in Chicago, coupled with artistic development in Mexico under the guidance of muralist David Alfaro Siqueiros and influence from other major figures within Mexican Modern Art and Mexican Muralism, created a distinctive style that matured in Tucson, Arizona. As an art educator, he influenced a generation of students, taught for numerous years at the University of Arizona, and offered public instructional classes. His paintings, prints, and drawings were continuously shown in southern Arizona throughout the 1950s, 60s, and 70s, gaining national recognition and receiving numerous awards.

== Education ==
MacKaben was born in Lansing, Michigan, in 1920. A World War II veteran from Chicago, he received a diploma in drawing from the School of Art Institute of Chicago in 1948. Soon afterwards, he went to Mexico where he studied at the Insituto Allende in San Miguel de Allende 1948–49 and, from 1949 to 1950, at the Instituto Nacional de Bellas Artes, Mexico City, where he studied under David Alfaro Siqueiros and José Ruiz. In 1953, he graduated from the Art Institute of Chicago with a B.A. in education.

== Career ==
Mackaben moved to Tucson in 1953. He worked for the Tucson school system as arts and crafts supervisor. He showed his work at the Tucson Art Center gallery and with the 261 Gallery Group at the Temple of Music, and continued to show regionally and locally throughout the 1950s with the Tucson Fine Arts Association.

Following a 1954 show of western regional artists in San Francisco, the San Francisco Chronicle’s art critic Alfred Frankenstein wrote: "The most individual of these artist is Mackaben who manages to use the devices of abstract art without a touch of solemnity. He paints the Arizona towns and people, fantastic rocks and desert landscape with a great deal of formal ingenuity and with a rather subtle palette, but always with gusto, whimsicality and humor."

In 1958 Mackaben received an award for his woodcut “Shapes of the Desert”, presented by the Tucson Fine Arts Association. He served as the arts and crafts supervisor in the Tucson school system while earning his master's degree in art from the University of Arizona. He was awarded an M.A. in 1959. His thesis entitled “Exploration in the Use of Lucite as a Medium for Oil Painting” is a discussion of eight of his paintings: Gothic Warrior, Retirement, High Country – Evening, Matador, Tintype, Tesuque Singers and Drummers, The Betrayal, and Watermelon Eaters, and "how the medium Lucite affected the aesthetic qualities of color, texture, glazing, transparencies, and permanency...".

In 1959 he began teaching art at the University of Arizona Fine Arts College, Pima Community College and conducted several workshops.

In 1960 his work “Punks” was featured in the Tucson Daily Citizen in conjunction with an exhibition at the Temple of Music and Art Galleries. In October of that year he showed as part of a University of Arizona Art Gallery faculty exhibition that included work by James Powell Scott, Warren Anderson, Douglas Dennison Maurice Grossman, Charles Littler and Andrew Rush. He received an honorable mention in the sculpture section of the Fine Arts Show at the Arizona State Fair in Phoenix in November 1960.

By 1963, he was given a one-man show of drawings, woodcuts, oils and lithographs at the Workshop Center of the Arts in Tucson. The semi-abstract works featured motifs of men and motor cars, "recreating his subjects with original and evocative expression and certain humor." In October Mackaben was elected as president of the Tucson Artists Guild and able to turn to painting full-time and to experiment with different media including the mixing of Lucite with oils.

== Analyzing his works ==
In 1968, on the occasion of his shows with the Chuck Winter Art Gallery, the Tucson Citizen wrote: "Mackaben’s work is represented in private collections in the United States, Mexico, Canada and the Far East. He has exhibited extensively for more than two decades and has won many awards in California. The 16 paintings […] are highlighted by his sympathetic portrayal of Mexicans. The plastic medium used by Mackaben seems to heighten his ingenuity in documenting out Arizona towns and the landscape which surrounds them."

Tucson Daily Citizen art critic Alberta Friedlander wrote in conjunction with a 1972 solo exhibition that Mackaben's paintings are: "Social Realism, which reveals the customs and foibles of people in an exaggerated expressionist manner. At times his message is so broad as to border on cartooning. All are painted in very personal style and he uses acrylics in strong colors giving his canvases an overall textured surface with a tactile quality." A reviewer in 1974 saw a "slight debt to Ben Shahn" in Mackaben's recent paintings.

Always actively involved in the community and its diverse needs, including mental health care and free clinics for the impoverished, Mackaben lived much as he painted—close to the people with all their joys and failings. He painted and printed the darker and more comic aspects of local life, moments of anguished protest and the earnest efforts of the locals to cultivate some semblance of pomp and circumstance in, as he put it, “our world’s comedy of errors.”

== Collections ==
Mackaben's works are held in a number of collections including the Tucson Museum of Art (Untitled (1961)), and the University of Arizona Museum of Art (Desert Shapes By Moonlight (1956), and Black Is Beautiful (c. 1949)).

== Legacy ==
His work was included in the 1998 exhibition, Tucson's Early Moderns, 1945–1965 held at the University of Arizona Museum of Art.
