= Linda E. Carlson =

Canadian clinical psychologist (born 1969)

- Born: Linda Ellen Carlson; August 10, 1969 (age 57)

Academic background
- Education: McGill University, University of Calgary

Academic work
- Discipline: Clinical Psychology; Psychosocial Oncology; Mindfulness
- Website: www.lindacarlson.ca

Linda E. Carlson (born 10 August 1969) is a Canadian clinical psychologist. She is a professor at the University of Calgary, where she holds the Enbridge Research Chair in Psychosocial Oncology.

== Education and career ==
Carlson earned an undergraduate degree in psychology from the University of Calgary in 1991, and a Ph.D. in clinical psychology from McGill University in 1998.

Carlson is currently a professor in the Division of Psychosocial Oncology in the Department of Oncology, Cumming School of Medicine, and an Adjunct Professor in the Department of Psychology at the University of Calgary. She holds the Enbridge Research Chair in Psychosocial Oncology.

Carlson conducts research on psychosocial topics within oncology, including issues of cancer-related distress; integrative oncology interventions (such as mindfulness); and survivorship. She has published over 240 research papers and books.

== Selected works ==
- Carlson, L. E.; Speca, M.; Patel, K. D.; Goodey, E. (2003). "Mindfulness-based stress reduction in relation to quality of life, mood, symptoms of stress, and immune parameters in breast and prostate cancer outpatients". Psychosomatic Medicine. 65 (4): 571–581. doi:10.1097/01.PSY.0000074003.35911.41. PMID 12883107. S2CID 1683503.
- Carlson, L. E.; Angen, M.; Cullum, J.; Goodey, E.; Koopmans, J.; Lamont, L.; Simpson, J. S. A. (2004). "High levels of untreated distress and fatigue in cancer patients". British Journal of Cancer. 90 (12): 2297–2504. doi:10.1038/sj.bjc.6601887. PMC 2410292. PMID 15162149.
- Shapiro, S. L.; Carlson, L. E.; Astin, J. A.; Freedman, B. (2006). "Mechanisms of mindfulness". Journal of Clinical Psychology. 62 (3): 373–386. doi:10.1002/jclp.20237. PMID 16385481. S2CID 6968813.
- Shapiro, S. L., & Carlson, L. E. (2009). The art and science of mindfulness: Integrating mindfulness into psychology and the helping professions. Washington, DC: American Psychological Association. ISBN 9781433804656
