= Emily McDonald =

American neurologist and media personality

- Born: Emily McDonald; November 17th Albany, New York
- Education: University of Texas at Austin
- Occupation: neuroscientist: media personality
- Years active: 2020–present

Emily McDonald, also known as Emonthebrain, is an American media personality. She has been featured on Newsweek, Business Insider, The Jennifer Hudson Show, Metro, ScienceAlert and The Independent, amongst others.

== Career ==
McDonald focuses on public engagement around cognitive neuroscience, particularly how thoughts and beliefs affect brain health and behaviour. Her insights have appeared across major media platforms including The Independent, Business Insider, ScienceAlert and Metro. Some other media are Daily Mirror, Daily Mail, New York Post, AOL and Upworthy, and on broadcast shows including The Jennifer Hudson Show and Inspired Delusions by iHeartRadio, amongst others, where she has discusses topics such as neuroplasticity, emotional regulation, psychological habits and their neurological impacts.
