= Louis Hock =

American artist and filmmaker

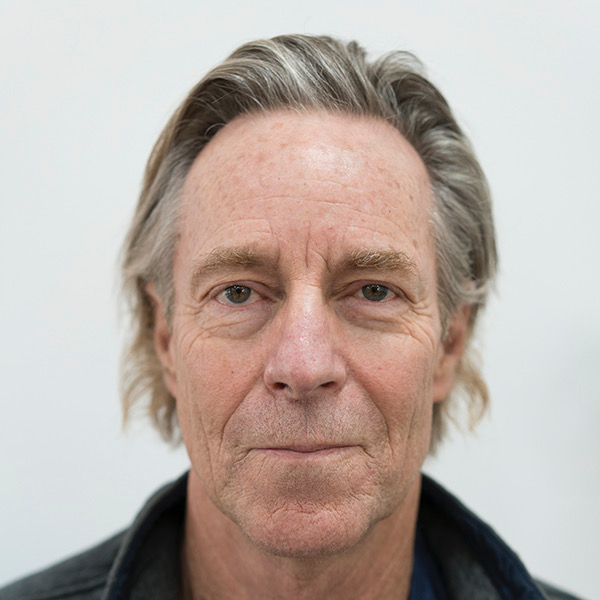
- Born: 1948 (age 77–78); Los Angeles, CA, U.S.
- Known for: Independent Film, Art, Public Art
- Notable work: THE MEXICAN TAPES: A Chronicle of Life Outside the Law, THE AMERICAN TAPES:Tales of Immigration, Southern California, Welcome to America’s Finest Tourist Plantation, Art Rebate / Arte Reembolso
- Awards: American Film Institute Independent Film Maker Grant in 1988, National Endowment for the Arts Grant in 1989, Rockefeller Foundation Grant, California Arts Council Grant in 2002.

Louis Hock (born 1948) is an American artist and independent filmmaker who works in film, video, installation and interventions in public space. His work has been exhibited both internationally and nationally including most notably at the Whitney Museum of American Art, the Museum of Modern Art in New York, the Museum of Contemporary Art, Los Angeles, the San Francisco Museum of Art, and the Getty Museum in Los Angeles as part of Pacific Standard Time: Art in L.A., 1945-1980. Several of his films are in the collection of Video Data Bank. Louis Hock currently holds the title of Professor Emeritus at University of California - San Diego. He has additionally collaborated on several public art projects with Elizabeth Sisco and David Avalos.

His most notable grants and awards include an American Film Institute Independent Film Maker Grant, a National Endowment for the Arts Grant, a Rockefeller Foundation Grant, and a California Arts Council Grant.

== Life and career ==
Born in 1948 in Los Angeles, California, Louis Hock has spent most of his life within a fifty-mile radius of the border between the United States and Mexico. The first graduate student in film to graduate from School of the Art Institute of Chicago, Hock cites two early influences in Stan Brakhage and Nam June Paik. In 1977, Louis Hock joined the visual arts department faculty at University of California - San Diego, where he is currently professor emeritus.

The Academy Film Archive has preserved several of Louis Hock's films, including Still Lives, Studies in Chronovision, and Light Traps.

== Works ==
=== THE MEXICAN TAPES: A Chronicle of Life Outside the Law ===
Started in 1978,THE MEXICAN TAPES: A Chronicle of Life Outside the Law is a four-hour-long video in four parts documenting the lives and experiences of his undocumented working class Mexican immigrant neighbors in the Los Analos community in San Diego, California. Upon completion in 1986, the eight year film project has since been broadcast internationally on television stations including PBS, the BBC and Televisa. In an interview about the work with KCET Television, Hock describes the process of starting the work: "I moved in [to The Analos Apartments], and at a certain point they were going to tear it down, they said in the paper, that in 6 months they were going to turn it into a Best Western motel. And I was a filmmaker...so I started filming, and they didn't tear it down, and then I kept filming, and then I kept filming, and it was very unlike the work I was producing at the time. So it started off as a very small modest project, it started off as an experiment.

=== THE AMERICAN TAPES: Tales of Immigration ===
The sequel film to THE MEXICAN TAPES: A Chronicle of Life Outside the Law, THE AMERICAN TAPES: Tales of Immigration revisits the families Louis Hock interviewed and documented in THE MEXICAN TAPES thirty years later. In this sequel, Hock claims that the 1986 Immigration Reform and Control Act successfully transformed the families he originally documented. The film premiered on the west coast at the Museum of Contemporary Art San Diego on May 11, 2013.

=== Southern California ===
In 1979, this three screen cinemural was finished as a 70-minute film, "a single thread of 16mm film runs through three side-by-side projectors." As an extension of Hock's decade of experimental film practice, the work centers Southern California as an imaginary landscape: a confection of public relations and glossy photographs. Made for exhibition in public spaces, rather than theaters, the work premiered on Los Angeles streets using a semi tractor trailer and large mobile home as screen surfaces. Subsequent public exhibitions were sponsored by museums in various U.S. cities including San Diego (San Diego Museum of Art), New York (Whitney Museum), Pittsburgh (Carnegie Museum), and Denver (Denver Art Museum). In 2004 the film was digitized and screened for the first time in 20 years on the walls of the Getty Center in Los Angeles. As part of the “Pacific Standard Time” event in 2011, a trailer of the cinemural was fabricated for screening inside the Getty Center galleries then traveled to the Martin-Gropius Bau in Berlin.

=== Welcome to America’s Finest Tourist Plantation (with Elizabeth Sisco and David Avalos) ===
The first collaborative project between Elizabeth Sisco, Louis Hock and David Avalos was Welcome to America's Finest Tourist Plantation (1988). The project included a bus poster "depicting a pair of hands Washing dirty dishes, a pair of hands being hand-cuffed, and a pair of hands delivering clean towels to a hotel room. "One hundred public buses in San Diego displayed these images on their back panels." The bus poster directed attention to the hypocritical treatment of Mexican and Central American immigrants in a community whose tourist industry depends on the labor of undocumented workers and whose Super Bowl depended on the tourist industry. The public artwork became a magnet for the national media when local officials let it be known that they were trying to have the posters removed."

=== Art Rebate / Arte Reembolso (with Elizabeth Sisco and David Avalos) ===
The collaborative public media art project, “Art Rebate (1993)" refunded 10 dollar bills to as many as 450 undocumented workers in the California and Mexico border near San Diego. The Museum of Contemporary Art, San Diego and Centro Cultural de la Raza commissioned the project for the "La Frontera/The Border" art exhibition in 1993. In an essay by former Afterimage (magazine) editor Grant Kester, the author states "In the "Arte Reembolso/Art Rebate" project (1993) they distributed signed 10 dollar bills to undocumented workers as a symbolic recognition of their contribution to the Southern California economy. The work was developed to directly challenge conservative arguments that migrant workers constitute a negative drain on the state's resources. As Avalos, Hock and Sisco discovered, undocumented workers make a substantial contribution to the economy, not merely through the profits they provide for their employers, but also through the expenditures they make in the U.S. and the taxes that are deducted from their pay." The project received a grant from the Museum of Contemporary Art San Diego and a grant from National Endowment for the Arts. Josh Dare, a spokesperson for the National Endowment for the Arts said of the project "Those three artists are very good at, and I give them credit for, choosing art to create public dialogues. If art is supposed to create discussion and dialogue about the issues of the day, then touche."
