= Amanda M. Fanniff =

- Occupations: Professor, Clinical Psychologist, researcher

Academic background
- Education: Northwestern University; University of Arizona, Tucson

Academic work
- Discipline: Clinical Psychology
- Sub-discipline: Psychology, Policy, and Law
- Institutions: Palo Alto University

Amanda M. Fanniff is an American clinical psychologist who is an Associate Professor of Psychology and the Faculty Senate Chair at Palo Alto University's Pacific Graduate School of Psychology. Fanniff is also a clinical psychologist. At Palo Alto University, she is affiliated with the Developmentally Informed Policy and Practice Research Lab. Her research addresses forensic mental health assessment, legal system processing, and the influence of sociocultural identities.

== Education ==
Fanniff received her Bachelors of Science in Human Development and Psychological Services in 2001 from Northwestern University. Fanniff then attended graduate school at the University of Arizona, Tucson, where she obtained her Masters of Arts in Clinical Psychology in 2004 and her PhD in Clinical Psychology, with a subspecialization in psychology, policy, and law in 2009. Judith V. Becker supervised Fanniff's dissertation at the University of Arizona, Tucson. Her dissertation titled The Measurement of Juveniles' Competence Related Abilities focused on exploring the validity and reliability of the first two scales in the Competence Assessment for Standing Trial for Defendants with Mental Retardation (CAST-MR) and determining if age was associated with immature judgment, and whether or not immature judgement predicted conclusions made about the defendant's own case.

At the Western Psychiatric Institute and Clinic at the University of Pittsburgh Medical Center (UPMC), Fanniff completed her predoctoral clinical psychology internship from September 2008 to August 2009. From September 2009 until August 2011, she did a post-doctoral fellowship at the University of South Florida's Louis de la Parte Florida Mental Health Institute in the Department of Mental Health Law and Policy.

== Career ==
Beginning in 2001, Fanniff assistant taught various undergraduate and graduate level classes at the University of Arizona, Tucson, such as the Structure of Mind and Behavior, Psychology and Law, Law and Policy in Society, Statistics, and Forensic Psychology. Following her assistant teaching experience, in 2005-2006, Fanniff was an instructor on Violence and Youth at the University of Arizona, Tucson, in which she taught psychology and sociology undergraduate students. In 2002, 2003, and 2007, she was an instructor on Clinical Psychology at the University of Arizona, Tucson. Throughout this time, Fanniff obtained a significant amount of clinical experience, including acting as an assistant to forensic psychologist, Judith V. Becker. She also was a guest lecturer on Forensic Psychology at the University of South Florida in 2010, in which she taught students at undergraduate and graduate levels. Additionally, Fanniff was an ad hoc reviewer for the Journal of Forensic Psychology Practice and Journal of Behavioral Health Services and Research in 2010. During the same year, Fanniff was on the Editorial Board for Sexual Abuse: A Journal of Research and Treatment.

After Fanniff completed her post-doctoral fellowship in 2011, she became an Associate Professor of Psychology at Palo Alto University's Pacific Graduate School of Psychology, where she started at in September 2011 and still works. She is affiliated with the Association for the Treatment and Prevention of Sexual Abuse (ATSA), the American Psychology-Law Society, the Association for Psychological Science, and the American Psychological Association. She also is affiliated with the Developmentally Informed Policy and Practice Research Lab at Palo Alto University.

== Research ==
Fanniff's research is centered on forensic mental health assessment, legal system processing, and how that influences sociocultural identities. She has conducted a significant amount of research on juvenile sex offenders, such as how the process of the legal system views these offenders and what considerations to have developmentally when engaging with adolescent sex offenders.

Fanniff is most notable for her research, in collaboration with Judith V. Becker, on Specialized assessment and treatment of adolescent sex offenders, having 117 citations. In this literature review article, Fanniff and Becker review past research on the validity and reliability of assessment tools used specifically for juvenile sex offenders and highlight the importance of specialized assessment tools for this population of offenders.

Fanniff also has supervised and collaborated on research with doctoral candidates at Palo Alto University's Developmentally Informed Policy and Practice Research Lab. Their research is centered on public policy issues with regard to forensic psychology and focused primarily on juvenile and post-adolescence cohorts. Fanniff has presented research with her doctoral students at various conferences and conventions, such as the 2024 American Psychological Association Convention in Seattle, Washington, the 2024 American Psychology-Law Society Annual Conference in Los Angeles, California, the 2023 American Psychology-Law Society Annual Conference in Philadelphia, Pennsylvania, the 2018 Association for the Treatment and Prevention of Sexual Abuse (ATSA) 37th Annual Research and Treatment Conference in Vancouver, British Columbia, and the American Psychological Association 2021, Division 41 Convention, which took place virtually.
