= Henry Koffler =

Austrian-born American scientist and artist (1922–2018)

President of the University of Arizona
- In office 1982–1991
- Preceded by: John Paul Schaefer
- Succeeded by: Manuel Trinidad Pacheco

Personal details
- Born: September 17, 1922 Vienna, Austria
- Died: March 10, 2018 (aged 95) Tucson, Arizona, U.S.
- Spouse: Phyllis Pierson Koffler
- Education: University of Arizona; University of Wisconsin
- Occupation: Scientist, Educator, Administrator, Artist

Henry Koffler (born Heinrich Koffler; September 17, 1922 – March 10, 2018) was an Austrian-born American scientist, academic and artist.

== Early life ==
Koffler was born in Vienna, Austria. In 1939, at the age of 17, he emigrated by himself to the United States. The second recipient of the International Scholar by the University of Arizona, Koffler received his B.S. degree in Agricultural Chemistry in 1943 from the University of Arizona, and from the University of Wisconsin, his M.S. in Microbiology in 1944 and Ph.D. in Microbiology and Biochemistry in 1947.

== Purdue, University of Minnesota, University of Massachusetts Amherst ==
In 1947 he became an assistant professor of bacteriology at Purdue University and was rapidly promoted to a full professorship in 1952 – then the youngest full professor at Purdue. In 1953 he held a Guggenheim Fellowship at Western Reserve University medical school and in 1957 was awarded the Eli Lilly Award in Bacteriology and Immunology from the American Society of Bacteriology (now Microbiology).

From 1959–1975, Koffler served as Purdue University's Head of Biological Sciences, a department that he brought to international prominence. In 1974 he was appointed a Frederick L. Hovde Distinguished Professor of Biology. During his tenure at Purdue until 1975, his research concentrated on the physiology and biochemistry of microorganisms. His ability to identify, recruit, and help develop promising scientists, and to successfully build and lead intellectual enterprises, became widely known. This led to his appointments as Vice-President for Academic Affairs at the University of Minnesota in 1975, Chancellor of the University of Massachusetts Amherst in 1979, leaving in 1982 to become the President of The University of Arizona.

== University of Arizona ==
Koffler served as president of The University of Arizona from 1982 to 1991, the first alumnus of the University of Arizona to hold the position. Building on the successful presidencies of Richard Harvill and John Schaefer, creators of the modern University of Arizona, Koffler presided over the growth of the University during 1982–1991, which led to the election of the University of Arizona into the highly selective Association of American Universities, and to the National Science Foundation national ratings in 1991 as 20th in Research and Development among all (private and public) American institutions and as 15th among public universities. These achievements were partly fueled during his presidency through the recruitment of approximately 700 faculty members and other professionals. There was an increase in the ethnic and gender diversity of the University, with a 94 percent increase of minority faculty members, a 118 percent increase in women faculty members, and a 123 percent increase in minority students. State funding almost doubled, R&D expenditures increased almost 150 percent, university facilities were expanded almost 60 percent, and 34 research centers were created.

Koffler received numerous recognitions for his contributions to the universities, professional groups, and communities that he served. He was a Fellow of the American Academy of Microbiology since its founding in 1955 and received honorary doctorates from Purdue University in 1977 and from the University of Arizona and Amherst College in 1981. Purdue University established the Henry Koffler Distinguished Professorship in 1996 and the University of Arizona's Chemistry-Biology Building was named the Henry Koffler Building in 2000. He also received the University of Arizona Alumni Association's 2001 Alumni Achievement Award.

=== Koffler Prize ===
In 2001 the University of Arizona established the annual Koffler Prizes, through Henry and Phyllis Koffler to recognize outstanding accomplishments in the areas of teaching, research/scholarship/creative activity, or public service/outreach.

== Retirement ==
=== Academy Village and Arizona Senior Academy ===
In 1991 Koffler conceived the Arizona Senior Academy and the Academy Village retirement community in 1991 for professionals over the age of 55 who want to continue living an active life of academic and creative pursuits, and contribution to their local and global communities.

=== Art career ===
Koffler's interest in the visual arts, and in sculpture, ballet, and architecture began as a child when he attended many of Vienna's cultural offerings in music and theatre with his mother. During his 1953–54 sojourn as a Guggenheim Fellow in Cleveland, he became a conspicuous presence in the Cleveland Museum of Art, where he became acquainted with the Curator of Prints and Drawings, Leona E. Prasse, who sparked his interest in the visual arts. After his return to Purdue, Koffler became acquainted with Rudy Pozzatti, a leading printmaker in America and Distinguished Professor at Indiana University. His friendship with Pozzatti began his habit of collecting art and visiting galleries and museums. Consequently, he became well acquainted with prehistoric and primitive art, as well as modern German, French, Mexican, Japanese, and American art.

Koffler admired the painters of the American abstract expressionism movement that began in the 1940s, especially Mark Tobey, Jackson Pollock, Paul Jenkins, and Helen Frankenthaler, who influenced him significantly when, in 2013, he turned from appreciating to creating art. In 2013 at the age of 90, during a long recuperation from emergency surgery, Koffler began a career in art. Using his iPad to do abstract digital images, Koffler created thousands of digital paintings, had several art shows, and launched the Henry Koffler Art website.

==== Koffler Art Exhibitions ====
- Magical World of Henry Koffler's Abstract Art, May 21 – October 31, 2014, University of Arizona Tech Parks Arizona. First solo exhibition. See University of Arizona Tech Parks Arizona, Magical World of Henry Koffler's Abstract Art show. See online article. See paintings from the show.
- SAACA 2015 Spring Exhibition, April 23 – July 14, 2015, Ventana Medical Systems, Tucson, Arizona. See SAACA announcement and Henry Koffler Art web page. See paintings from the show.
- University of Arizona Leaders of Eminence Develop into Artists of Distinction, May 5 – December 31, 2015, law firm of Mesch, Clark, & Rothschild, Tucson, Arizona. See the Henry Koffler Art page. See paintings from the show.
- Art in the Park, January 25 – March 29, 2017, University of Arizona Tech Parks Arizona. See paintings from the show.
- 95!, January 14 – March 15, 2018, Tucson Jewish Community Center, Tucson, Arizona. See paintings from the show.

=== Death ===
Koffler died on March 10, 2018, in Tucson, Arizona at age 95. His wife of 71 years, Phyllis (Pierson) Koffler, died on March 31, 2019, in Tucson, Arizona at age 97.

== Academic career ==
- 1943: B.S., University of Arizona
- 1944: M.S., University of Wisconsin
- 1947: Ph.D., University of Wisconsin
- 1947: Assistant Professor of Bacteriology, Purdue University
- 1952: Professor, Purdue University
- 1959–1975: Head of Biological Sciences, Purdue
- 1975–1979: Vice-President for Academic Affairs, University of Minnesota
- 1979–1982: Chancellor, University of Massachusetts Amherst
- 1982–1991: President, University of Arizona

== Honors ==
- 1953: Guggenheim Fellowship, Western Reserve University School of Medicine
- 1955: Fellow, American Academy for Microbiology
- 1957: Eli Lilly Award in Bacteriology and Immunology, Society of American Bacteriologists (now named the American Society for Microbiology)
- 1974: Frederick L. Hovde Distinguished Professor of Biological, Purdue University
- 1977: Honorary doctorate, D.Sc., University of Purdue
- 1977: Chevalier, Ordre des Palmes Académiques
- 1979: Board of Regents citation, University of Minnesota
- 1981: Honorary doctorate, D.Sc., University of Arizona
- 1981: Honorary doctorate, LL.D., Amherst College
- 1982: Board of Regents citation, Court of Massachusetts
- 1991: Board of Regents citation, University of Arizona
- 2001: Alumni Achievement Award, University of Arizona
- 2016: Portraits of Excellence award, University of Arizona Hispanic Alumni Club
