= John Paul Schaefer =

American academic (born 1934)

President of the University of Arizona
- In office 1971–1982
- Preceded by: Richard Anderson Harvill
- Succeeded by: Henry Koffler

Personal details
- Born: September 17, 1934 (age 92) New York, New York, U.S.
- Education: University of Illinois
- Occupation: Chemist, photographer

John Paul Schaefer (born September 17, 1934) is an American academic. He was the president of the University of Arizona from 1971 to 1982. Having attended New York University Polytechnic School of Engineering and the University of Illinois, he was a chemistry professor. He is also a photographer, having worked with Ansel Adams.
