= Marty Rosenbluth =

American lawyer and activist

- Born: 1960 (age 65–66)
- Education: Antioch College; University of North Carolina School of Law

Marty Rosenbluth is an immigration lawyer and civil rights activist.

== Biography ==
Rosenbluth is a native of New York who attended Antioch College and University of North Carolina School of Law. He is Jewish and has said he lost many members of his family during The Holocaust. He volunteered for Amnesty International and spent seven years in the West Bank as an advocate for Palestinians He helped produce the award-winning documentary Jerusalem: An Occupation Set In Stone? in 1995, which detailed Israel's urban planning policies and the effects they had on Palestinians. He started the non-profit North Carolina Immigration Rights Project to help immigrants in the Durham, North Carolina area. He serves as an associate of Polanco Law PC in Durham, North Carolina, North Carolina.

He was part of a group of civil rights activists, including Rose Hamid, who protested Donald Trump campaign rallies in 2016 to protest Trump's treatment of Muslims. He designed the "Go Yellow Against Hate" star badges to accompany the protests. in 2016 he also provided free legal services to Syrian refugees.

In 2017 following the inauguration of President Trump, he moved from Hillsborough, North Carolina to Lumpkin, Georgia. Lumpkin has a detention center near the Alabama border and Rosenbluth decided to help refugees being detained there because there were no other lawyers in town, and the closest other lawyers were 140 miles away in Atlanta. According to a 2015 study, only about 6% of detainees had a lawyer to represent them. Rosenbluth successfully lured other lawyers to town by offering a spare bedroom in his three bedroom house.
