= Herbert Philips =

English businessman and philanthropist

Herbert Philips (18xx ? – 5 November 1905) of Sutton Oaks, Macclesfield, Cheshire, was an English philanthropist and justice of the peace.

== Background ==
Herbert Philips was the great-grandson of Nathaniel Philips, who co-founded, with his elder brother John, a tape manufacturing business in the mid-eighteenth century that became J. and N. Philips and Co. This company became one of Manchester's leading commercial enterprises, specialising in the weaving of narrow tape. By the mid-nineteenth century the extended Philips family held properties and businesses throughout Lancashire, Cheshire and Staffordshire along with the family seats in Heybridge and Heath House, Staffordshire. Herbert was the third son and youngest child of Robert Philips and Laetitia née Hibbert.

Herbert Philips' father's first cousin was Mark Philips, the elected Member of Parliament for Manchester following the campaign for Manchester's enfranchisement by the 1832 Reform Act. Mark Philips was instrumental in the provision of public open spaces, leading in 1846 to the first public park in Manchester which still bears his name: Philips Park.

== Clean air provision ==
Herbert Philips retained this commitment for clean air provision for the masses with his establishment of the permanent society, ‘The Committee for Securing Open Spaces for Recreation’ of which he was the Chairman and Treasurer. Likewise, he founded the ‘Noxious Vapours Abatement Association’ to promote the control of chemical and industrial smoke nuisances in Manchester and Salford, which proved so harmful to vegetation within these open spaces. He gave a member's address to the Manchester Statistical Society in 1896 entitled 'Open Spaces for Recreation in Manchester'.

== Philanthropy ==
His philanthropic works included numerous educational and recreational ventures. He is credited by the Oxford Dictionary of National Biography as being one of the founding supporters of the National Trust. He was president of the Young Men’s Christian Association based at the headquarters at 56 Peter Street in Manchester. This led to his involvement in the Manchester Women's Christian Temperance Association (MWCTA), which used the YMCA building for its committee meetings.

== Christian temperance ==
In October 1889, it was reported in the Manchester Guardian that Herbert Philips Esq., J.P. of Sutton Oaks, Macclesfield, had presided over a Police Court Mission meeting at the YMCA on Peter Street, and he reported that £700 had been raised and an inebriate's home at Ash Lodge, Halliwell Lane, Cheetham was being negotiated. He suggested that what was needed was to commit habitual offenders to such homes for a period of one to three years. At the AGM of the MWCTA in April 1890 it was reported that Herbert Philips Esq., J.P. had bought a house, namely ‘The Grove’ on Egerton Road, Fallowfield and had leased it to the committee on nominal terms for another such inebriate home or retreat.

== Freedom of the City of Manchester ==
He was awarded the Freedom of the City of Manchester in 1897. He was commissioned as a major in the 1st Manchester Volunteer Rifles, and on his death, he was honoured with a memorial service at Manchester Cathedral. His obituaries in the Manchester Guardian were numerous and extensive. The MWCTA memorial resolution stated that their members,

'Greatly record the help and counsel so often received and so cheerfully accorded by him, their admiration for the steady and unostentatious support given to every cause which had for its aim the alleviation of suffering or the uplifting of the fallen, and especially for the way in which he championed the cause of the tortured and defenceless'.

Herbert Philips was walking home on a country lane from Church with his wife on Sunday 5 November 1905 when he became unwell and collapsed. He was taken into a cottage nearby but died shortly afterwards without reaching his home. His funeral service was held at his childhood parish church of St Mary's Checkley, and he was buried in the family burial ground. His wife Ellen Josephine (Nelly) née Langton died in 1919 and was buried alongside.
