= Monica Bisordi =

American artistic gymnast

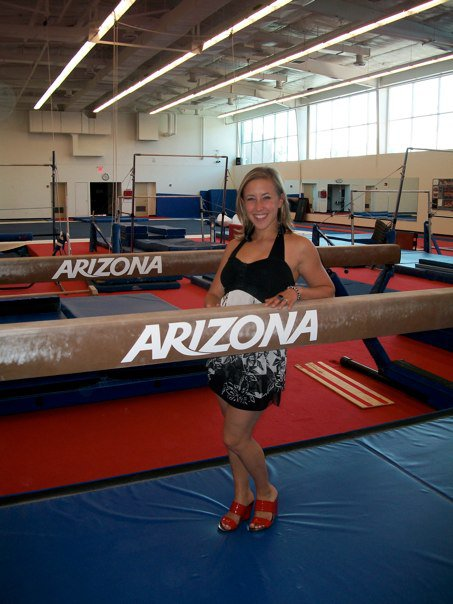

Personal information
- Full name: Monica Marie Bisordi
- Born: October 21, 1982 (age 43) Daly City, California
- Height: 5 ft 1 in (155 cm)

Gymnastics career
- Discipline: Women's artistic gymnastics
- College team: Arizona Wildcats (2002-2005)
- Club: Airborne Gymnastics Club (1998-2001)
- Head coach: Bill Ryden
- Music: You Shook Me All Night Long by AC/DC
- Retired: Yes

Monica Marie Bisordi (born October 21, 1982) is a former American artistic gymnast. She competed for the University of Arizona from 2002 - 2005. She is the University of Arizona's all-time leading scorer with 2,120.790 career points.

== Personal life ==
Monica was born in Daly City, California, the daughter and eldest child of Jim and Carol Bisordi. As a baby, Monica was diagnosed with nocturnal epilepsy. Her father, Jim, discovered that by keeping his firstborn active on a daily routine, the seizures could be controlled. So Monica never went on medication; instead she kept active with gymnastics.

Monica is the oldest of four children. She married fellow University of Arizona student Frank Orrell in 2012. They have three daughters. Monica and her family recently moved back to California after living on Oahu for five years. Her oldest brother, Matt (41), was a diver for the University of Texas before transferring to the University of Arizona after his sophomore year. His diving score contributed to the NCAA Swimming and Diving Championship in 2008. Her younger brother James was a collegiate basketball player and 6X national diver. Her sister, Jaclyn (36), was the starting point guard (3 of her 4 years) point guard at Sonoma State University. In her last semester of her final year she was the women's basketball student coach and she ran cross county.

Monica attended Notre Dame High School, a private, All-Female, Catholic, college preparatory high school in Belmont, California.

Monica graduated from the University of Arizona with a major in communications and a minor in sociology.

Monica was a certified pilates instructor in San Mateo, California before moving to Oahu.

== Early gymnastics history ==
Monica was a four-year member of the Airborne Gymnastics Club from 1998 - 2001. She was a level 10 competitor and a five-time national competitor.

=== Achievements & Awards ===
- 1997: Magnificent 10 Performer (Bars)
- 1997: National Junior Team Member
- 1999: Regional All-Around Champion
- 2000: National Beam Champion
- 2001: Regional Floor Champion
- 2001: Regional Vault Champion
- 2001: Regional All-Around Champion
- 2001: State All-Around Champion

== College gymnastics career ==
Monica amassed 49 individual titles (3x Vault, 5x Bars, 15x Beam, 10x Floor, 16x All-Around), 163 top 5 finishes and 2,120.790 total points in her four-year career at Arizona.

=== 2005 ===
- 14 Individual Titles (1x Vault, 1x Bars, 6x Beam, 2x Floor, 4x All-Around)
- 40 Top 5 Finishes
- 503.815 Total Points

=== 2004 ===
- 14 Individual Titles (2x Vault, 2x Bars, 1x Beam, 5x Floor, 4x All-Around)
- 44 Top 5 Finishes
- 610.500 Total Points

=== 2003 ===
- 17 Individual Titles (2x Bars, 6x Beam, 3x Floor, 6x All-Around)
- 47 Top 5 Finishes
- 576.725 Total Points

=== 2002 ===
- 4 Individual Titles (2x Beam, 2x All-Around)
- 32 Top 5 Finishes
- 429.750 Total Points

=== Achievements & Awards ===
- 2005: South Central Region Co-Gymnast of the Year
- 2005: First Team All-Pac-10 (All-Around)
- 2005: Pac-10 Gymnast of the Week (Feb. 14-21)
- 2004: Second Team All-America (Floor)
- 2004: First Team All-Pac-10 (All-Around)
- 2004: Pac-10 Gymnast of the Week (Feb. 2-8)
- 2002: First Team All-Pac-10 (Beam, All-Around)
