= Robert Miller (architect) =

American architect

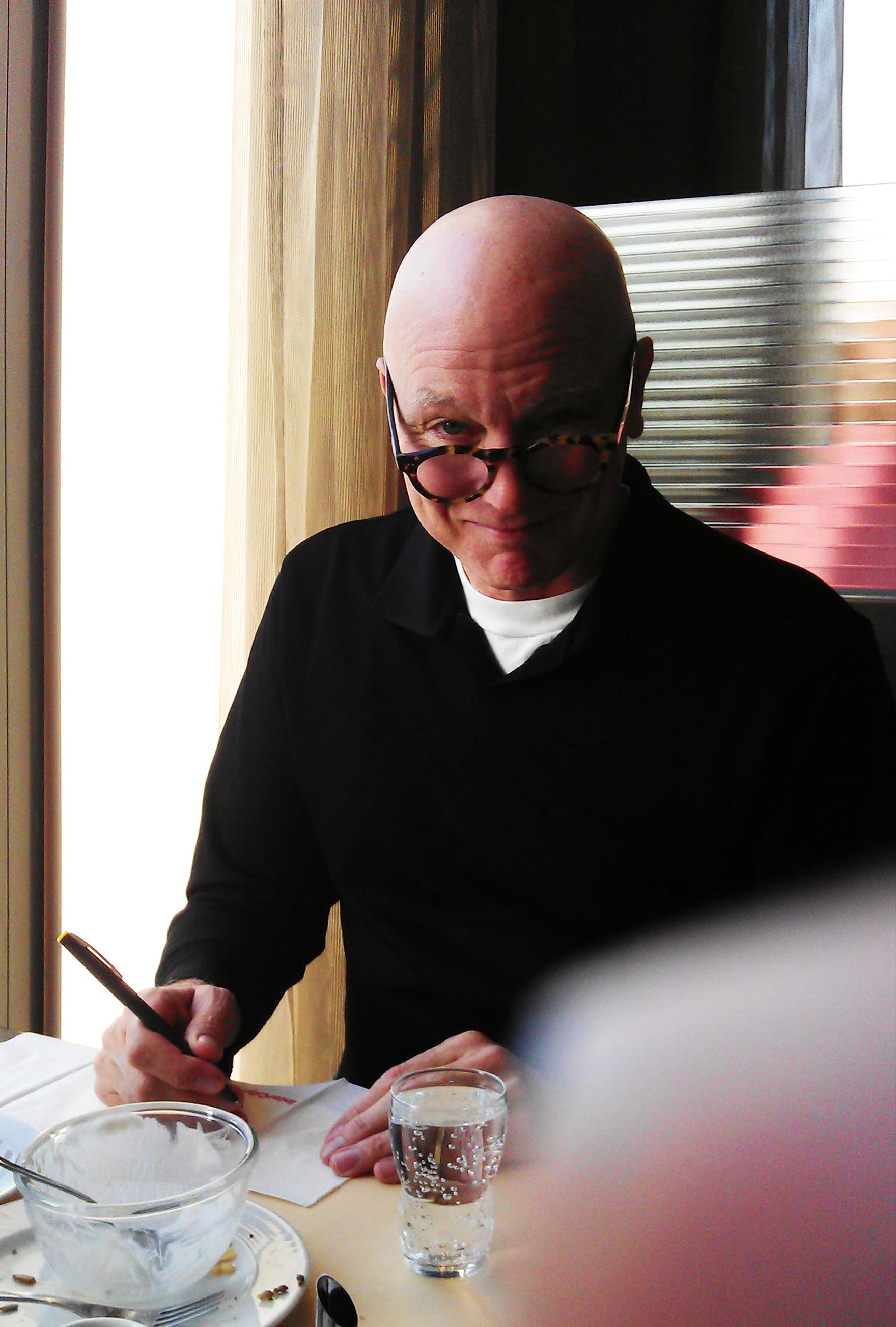
Robert Miller

Rob (Robert J.) Miller (born 1954) is an American architect.

== Early life ==
Rob Miller was born on March 12, 1954, in Oxford, Ohio. Due to the influence of his grandfather, who owned a lumberyard and construction company, and his uncle, who was an architect and teacher, he determined to become an architect while in junior high school. He worked for several architects while in college: Carpenter-Dalton Architects, Clemson (1974); Ernest Verges & Associates, New Orleans (1975); Duer Butler Architects Inc., Winter Park (1976); Caudill Rowlett Scott Architects, Houston (1977); Peter C. Papademetriou, Architect, Houston (1978). He received a Bachelor of Architecture from Clemson University (1976) and a Master of Architecture from Rice University with a certificate in Urban Design (1979). While working on his master's thesis, he worked occasionally as a musician and as a Staff Associate doing environmental research at The Rice Center: a research + development corporation, Houston (1978-79).

== Career ==
From 1979 to 1981 he was a designer for Thompson Ventulett Stainback & Associates, Atlanta. After he became a registered architect in Georgia in 1981, he worked as an Associate at RHPMHR Architects (also Rabun Hatch & Dendy, Architects), Atlanta (1981-1985). After becoming frustrated by the confines of commercial architecture, he incorporated his own firm, Robert Miller, Architect (Atlanta, 1985-1997; Charleston, 2001-2010), and began teaching part-time: Georgia Institute of Technology (1986-1990), Emory University (1993), and Clemson University (1982, 1986, 1990-1996).

During this era, Miller was heavily involved with the Architecture Society of Atlanta (1986-1993). His artist's book for the ASA, Implementing Architecture (Nexus Press, 1988), won the Grand Prize in Macworld's graphic design competition (1989), was the United States' entry to the Leipzig Book Show (1989), and was exhibited in the Ausstellung Amerikanischer Buchkunst (1992-1993). After meeting theoretical architect Douglas Darden in 1991 (Condemned Building, Princeton Architectural Press, 1993) and, learning of his recently diagnosed leukemia, Miller procured a grant from the Clemson Advancement Foundation to make a documentary on the ideas behind his work: “Douglas Darden: Looking After the Underbelly.” Darden died in 1996. The documentary was screened at a dozen museums and universities in North America between 1992-2014.

In the 1990s, Miller used components of his professional commissions to offer design/build courses for students, often collaborating with sculptor David Detrich: Teague Photography Studio, Atlanta (1994-1995); the Child Welfare Institute (1994-1995); and the Nexus Press Intervention (1997, 1999-2000). Based on his design/build work of the early 1990s, Miller won a Regional Visiting Artist residency at the American Academy in Rome (1997), sponsored by that institution and the Southern Arts Federation, after which he became professor in residence for Clemson University at the Charles E. Daniel Center in Genoa (Italy, 1997–1999).

In 1999 he returned to Clemson's main campus before accepting his first tenure-track appointment, becoming the first full-time Director of the Clemson Architecture Center in Charleston (2000-2010). In Charleston he applied the design/build pedagogy he had developed for small groups of students in a studio setting to a small graduate/undergraduate program. Typically, the CAC.C offered service-oriented studios in urban design and design/build pedagogy and a selection of practice-oriented courses offered by practicing architects. Under Miller’s leadership, the Charleston center won three NCARB Prizes for the Creative Integration of Practice and Education (2003, 2004, 2008) plus the national AIA’s Best Mentoring Practices award (2006). In 2009 Miller was awarded the ACSA Creative Achievement Award for a design/build project, the MINImuseum of Richard McMahan. Miller won first prize in the competition Präsenz der Zeit-European Cultural Capital 2010 Braunschweig, Germany (2004).

In 2010 Miller became the Director of the School of Architecture, at the University of Arizona in Tucson. During Miller’s tenure as Director of the UArizona SofA, a new M.Arch was developed and accredited (2016) and its Bachelor of Architecture was consistently ranked by the Design Futures Council in the nation’s top-25. From 2013-2015 he Co-Chaired HeadsNETWORK, the advocacy and professional development association of UArizona department heads, and from 2018 to 2021 was its inaugural Executive Director. Miller was awarded Educator of the Year by AIA Arizona (2014); then served as President of both AIA-Southern Arizona (2015) and AIA Arizona (2018). In 2020 he was recognized as a Senior Fellow of The Design Futures Council and awarded the Architect’s Medal by AIA Arizona, followed by the state AIA College of Fellows Chairman’s Award in 2022.

== Writings and research ==
- Implementing Architecture, Robert Miller, designer/editor (Atlanta: Nexus Press, 1988). Essays by Marco Frascari, Giuseppe Zambonini, Durham Crout, John Jacques, George Johnston, Robert Miller. Graphic design by Robert Miller + Pattie Belle Hastings. Sponsored by the Architecture Society of Atlanta.
- A Punchlist for Gold's Gym: the echoing of a dumbbell; in: Assemblage 15 (Aug 1991): 89-98.
- Dropping Hints: Peter Eisenman and the Inversion of Corbusian Aesthetics; in: Writing and the Architect (Charlotte: University of North Carolina, 1991).
- Stereotype and Architectural Journalism; in: Art Papers, Jan/Feb. 1996: cover, 20-25.
- The Analogue and the Real: two paradigms for architectural education; in: W. Carpenter (ed), Learning the Building, New York, Van Nostrand, 1997: 86-97 / also in German
- Das Analoge und das Wirkliche im architektonischen Diskurs; Ausdruck und Gebrauch—Dresdner wissenschaftliche Halbjahreshefte für Architektur Wohnen Umwelt 2 (Aachen, Germany: Shaker Verlag GmbH, 1 Halbjahr 2003) 17-43.
- Praxis als Ausbildung; in: Kl. Hornung, A. Schäfer (ed), Stadt-Bau-Kunst Braunschweig, Münster, Germany, Waxmann Verlag, 2004: 77-82. / also in Spanish:
- Pablo Esteban Marcelo Szelagowski, ed. translator, La práctica como (pedagogía como práctica); 47 Al Fondo 12 (La Plata, Argentina: Universidad Nacional de la Plata, December 2004): cover, 2-27.
- Architecture is what Blows off in a Hurricane; in: Wolkenkuckucksheim | Cloud-Cuckoo-Land | Воздушный замок, Vol. 12, Issue 23, 2008.
- El MINImuseum de Richard McMahan, trans. Pablo E.M. Szelagowski, 47 Al Fondo 17 (La Plata, Argentina: Universidad Nacional de la Plata), 2008, 2-13.

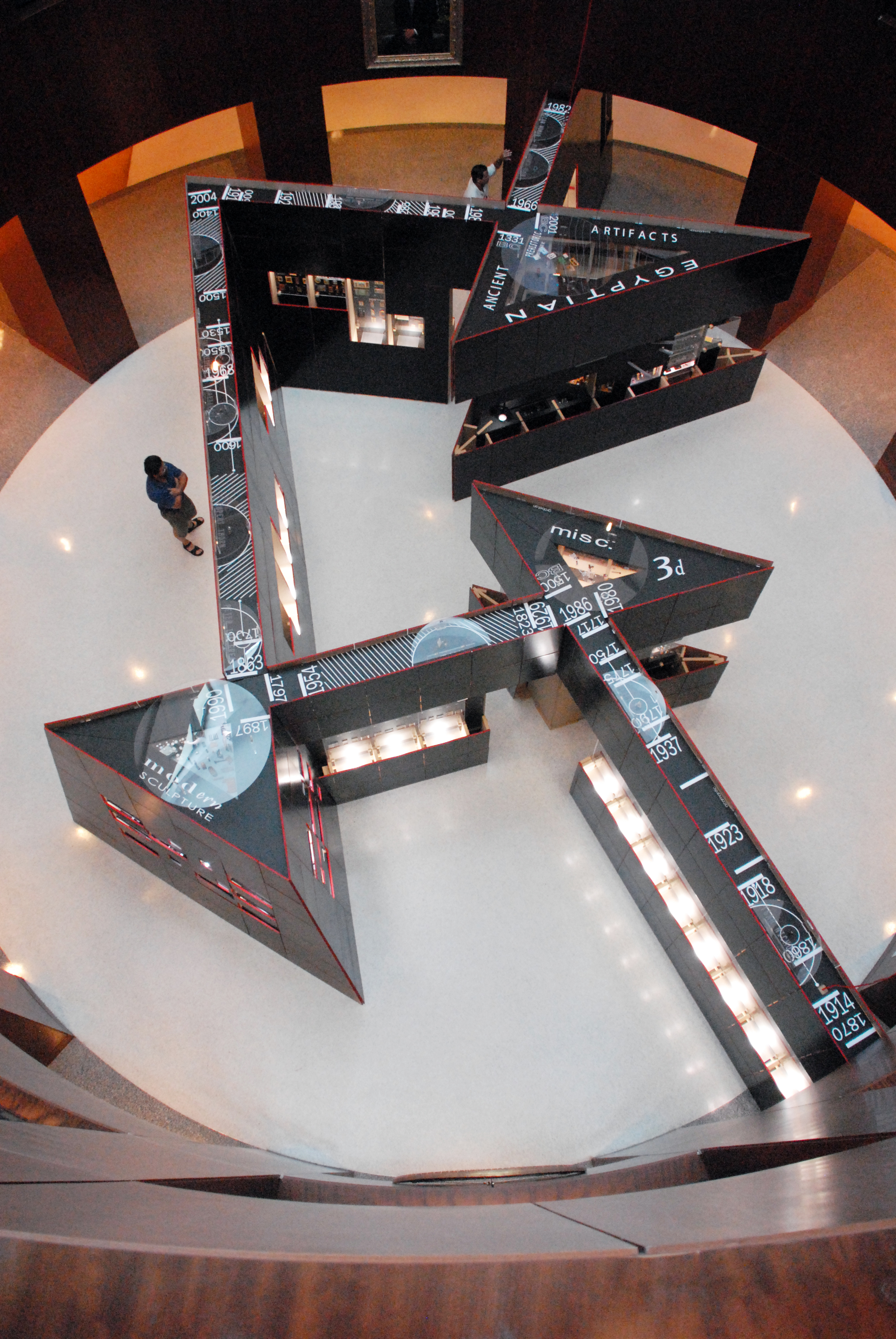
MINIMuseum

- Snapshots from a Professor in Residence,; in: Ufuk Ersoy, ed., 100 Years of Clemson Architecture: Southern Roots + Global Reach, (Clemson: Clemson University Press, 2015), 11-22. ISBN 978-1-942954-07-01
- Expanding the Expanded Field; in: Ute Poerschke and Sebastian Feldhusen, eds, Theory of Architecture. Contemporary Positions (Berlin: Birkhäuser, Bauwelt Fundamente series, 2017), 97-119. ISBN 978-3-0356-1458-9
- Verum Seri (“Truth Serum”), in: Brian Delford Andrews, Verum Fictum: Architectural Delineation and Speculation, 1984-2020. (Ames, Iowa: Culicidae Architectural Press, 2021), 39-51. ISBN 978-1-68315-025-1

== Works and projects ==
- GRAND’S GENERAL STORE; Powder Springs, GA (1986)
- ATLANTA BAKERY INTERVENTION, NABISCO BRANDS INC.; Atlanta, GA (1988)
- CHILD WELFARE INSTITUTE; Atlanta, GA (1994-1995) (demolished)
- SPA SYDELL; Cumberland Mall, Atlanta, GA (1992)
- TERRI TEAGUE PHOTOGRAPHY STUDIO; Decatur, GA (1994)
- NEXUS PRESS INTERVENTION; Atlanta, GA (1997–2000) (demolished)
- THE MINImuseum OF RICHARD MCMAHAN (Halsey Institute of Contemporary Art) College of Charleston, assisted by David Pastre, Sean Ahern (temporary installation)

== Teaching ==
Miller believed the primary purpose of architectural education was to prepare students for the profession but felt the academy's culture was poorly equipped for this mission. Consequently, he focused on "hybrid learning": merging educational content with professional practices. He argued that students could only learn what was relevant to them, so that professional practices must be applied to academic content. For example, to learn to deal with client idiosyncrasies he would have students cast dice at various points in a project to randomly change the assignment; rather than teach specifications, he taught students to write with precision on academic issues.

== About Miller and his works ==
- Court Street Center, in: Architectural Record,(August 1983): 53. and in: Inland Architect, July/Aug. 1984: 16-19.
- Grand's Convenience Store, in: Art Papers, (July/August 1987): 19.
- Nabisco Bakery Intervention, in: Progressive Architecture, March 1988
- Miniature Masterworks, in: South Carolina Architecture, 2009
- ATLANTA BUSINESS CHRONICLE

Kent Hoover, “Art, architecture married in new Nexus Press book,” Atlanta Business Chronicle (05 Dec 1988).

- MACWORLD

Joe Matazzoni, “Macintosh Masterpieces,” MacWorld (August 1989) 132-3.

- AUSSTELLUNG AMERIKANISCHER BUCHKUNST

Rebecca Ziegler, Ph.D., “Georgia Book Arts / Fine and Private Press Exhibition,” catalogue for Ausstellung Amerikanischer Buchkunst, (Statesboro: Georgia Southern University, 1992).

- ARCHITECTURE/GEORGIA

Kemp Mooney, “Art + Architecture Married,” Architecture/Georgia (summer 1992): 13.

- STADT-BAU-KUNST BRAUNSCHWEIG

“Praxis als Ausbildung (Ausbildung durch Praxis),” Alexandra Schäfer, Klaus Hornung, et al., eds., Stadt-Bau-Kunst Braunschweig (Berlin: Waxmann Verlag GmbH, 2004): 181-186.

- ERA

Lukáš Kohl, “Vice architektur,” Era 21 (June 2004): 57-64.

- FORCE OF NATURE

Mark Sloan and Brad Thomas, Force of Nature: Site Installations by Ten Japanese Artists (Charleston, SC: Halsey Institute of Contemporary Art, 2007) 68-71, 104-105, 110-111, 113, 132.

- THE POST & COURIER (CHARLESTON)

Allison L. Bruce, “Expanding on a School,” Post & Courier, 4 DEC 2001, 1D-2D. Francia McCormack, “Preserving Borough’s Heritage,” Post and Courier, 13 SEP 2002. “Navigating Home event will focus on Land Issues,” Post and Courier, 5 JUN 2003. Stephanie Harvin, “Social Sculpture takes neighbors home again,” Post & Courier, 6 JUN 2003. David Slade, “Evening Post weighs land use possibilities,” Post & Courier, 01 APR 2007. David Slade, “Clemson students devise rising sea level responses,” Post & Courier, 07 MAY 2007. Robert Behre, “Neighborhood Concept built on Bricks,” Post & Courier (24 May 2004): 1B, 6B. Robert Behre, “Tiny art, Big achievement” Post and Courier, 26 MAY 2008. Robert Behre, “Building a lot of Hope,” Post and Courier, 26 MAY 2009.

- CHARLESTON CITY PAPER

Bill Davis, “Building a New Charleston,” Charleston City Paper, 15 JAN 2003, 4, 7. Lindsay Koob, “Under the Sea,” Charleston City Paper, 12 SEP 2007, 27-29.
