= Mary Stiner =

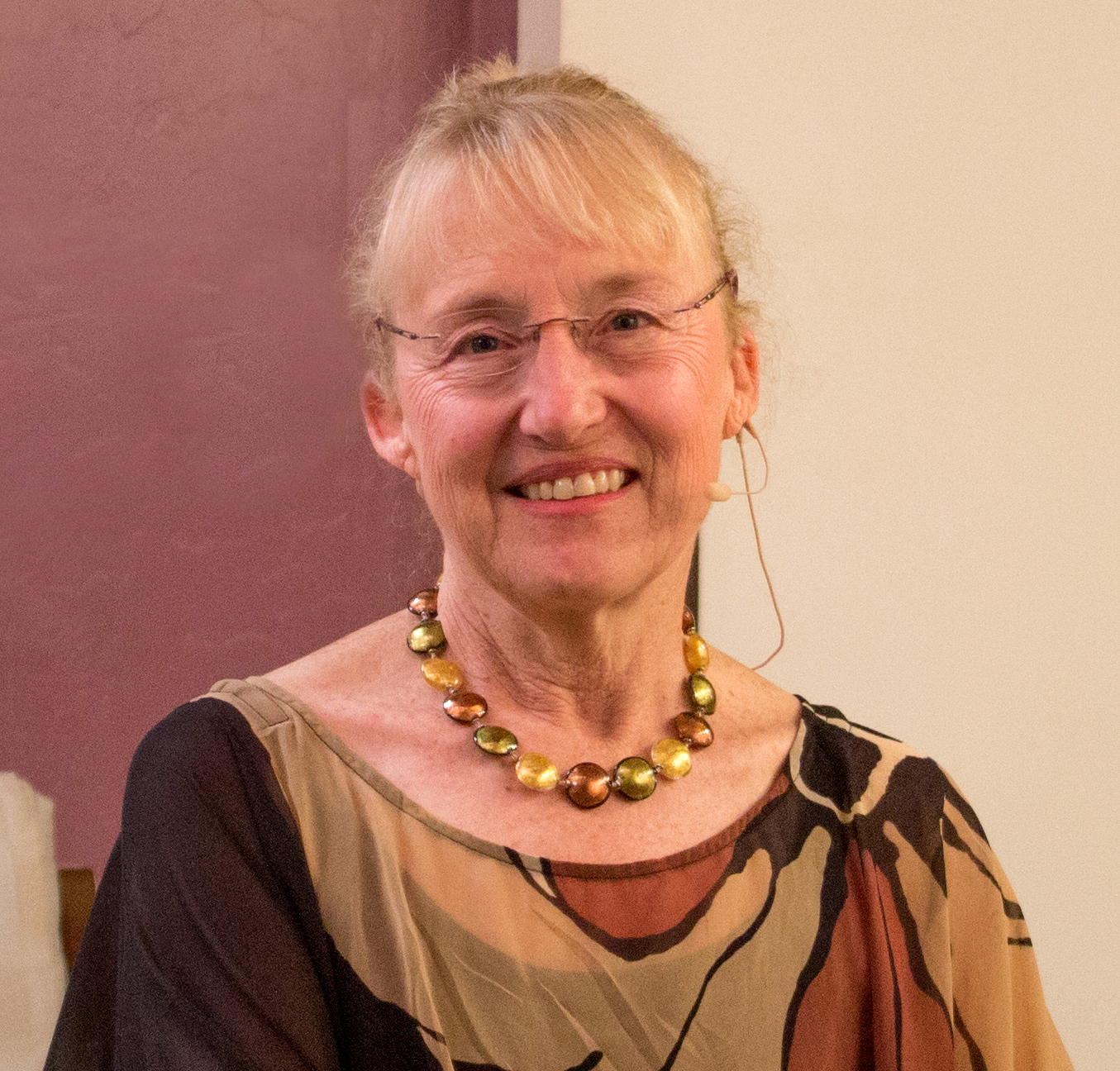

Mary C. Stiner is the Regents' Professor of Anthropology (emerita) in the School of Anthropology, University of Arizona, Tucson and Curator of Zooarchaeology (emerita) at the Arizona State Museum. She is known for her research on the economy and social behavior of ancient humans, as well as her analysis of burial rituals of early hominids. She was elected a Member of the National Academy of Sciences in 2025.

== Education ==
- Ph.D. Anthropology (Archaeology), University of New Mexico, Albuquerque, New Mexico
- M.A. Anthropology (Archaeology), University of New Mexico, Albuquerque, New Mexico
- B.A. Anthropology, University of Delaware, Newark, Delaware
- B.F.A. Fine Arts (Painting and Ceramic Sculpture), University of Delaware, Newark, Delaware

== Professional biography ==
Stiner was born in Newark, Delaware. She attended the University of Delaware as an undergraduate, where she earned a BA degree in Anthropology and a BFA in Fine Arts. She obtained her Ph.D. in 1990 from the University of New Mexico, where she worked with Lewis R. Binford. Other important influences were Lawrence G. Straus, Erik Trinkhaus, Diane Gifford-Gonzalez, and Henry Harpending.

Her first academic position was at Loyola University of Chicago (1993-1994). In 1994, she moved to the Department (later School) of Anthropology at the University of Arizona in Tucson, where she taught until her retirement in May 2025.

== Research ==
Stiner's research focuses on the evolution of humans' ecological niche and diet over the past half-million years. Her work is rooted in principles of ecological and evolutionary theory. She investigates the economies, social lives and symbolic practices of Paleolithic and early Neolithic humans, mainly through the study of animal remains from archaeological sites (zooarchaeology). In addition to generating complete accounts of faunal assemblages from archaeological sites, her approach emphasizes time series and inter-regional comparisons of high-resolution datasets. She often engages in interdisciplinary collaborations with geoarchaeologists and other scientists.

Stiner has conducted research on Paleolithic hunter gatherers and early Neolithic farming communities across the Mediterranean Basin—Italy, Israel, Türkiye, Greece, Serbia, and Portugal—in collaboration with local scholars and students. Stiner's research contributions include:

- Identification of dietary expansion stimulated in part by demographic pressure, during the Upper Paleolithic period. This process began much earlier than previously recognized and is most evident from the ways in which small prey animals were exploited ;
- Studies of changes in the predatory econiche of humans and human ancestors over the past 500,000 years based on prey mortality patterns, prey species composition, bone modification, and other faunal evidence. Her work tracks shifts in early humans' position in Pleistocene food webs and in large predator guilds, early marine foraging, resource intensification, and innovations in tool-assisted food processing methods including fire;
- Theoretical and empirical exploration of symbolic expression by Neanderthals in the form of burial practices and uses of body ornaments as proxies for expanding scales of social interaction;
- Confirmation of an early (and largely independent) center of sheep and goat domestication at Aşıklı Höyük in central Anatolia, supporting a multi-regional model of how animal domestication arose, and elucidating the mechanisms and stages of in-situ sheep and goat domestication at this site;
- Examining evolving social relations in early humans over the course of the Pleistocene geological epoch, particularly in connection with the development of residential camp sites.

Stiner has also been instrumental in developing widely emulated methods for the study of age structures in the prey populations of human hunters, the investigation of fire technology in early contexts, and inter-disciplinary work on early animal management practices.

== Honors and awards ==
- 1986 Fulbright Fellow - Institute for International Education
- 1989-90 American Fellow, American Association of University Women Foundation
- 1995-2000 National Science Foundation CAREER grant recipient
- 1996 Society for American Archaeology Book Award for Honor Among Thieves (Princeton)
- 2010 Leverhulme Trust Visiting Professorship, University College London, UK
- 2014 Elected Regents Professor, University of Arizona, Tucson.
- 2021 Fryxell Award for Interdisciplinary Studies, Society for American Archaeology
- 2025 Elected to the United States National Academy of Sciences.
