= Robert K. Phillips =

Robert K. Phillips is a San Francisco trial attorney currently serving as a Marin County Commissioner. Phillips also serves as Trustee for Garrett Theological Seminary and recently received Commendation from the United States Department of Justice for his contributions in trial advocacy. He has been a frequent guest on the legal program, Legal InCite.

Phillips has a B.A. degree from the University of Arizona, a M.Th. from Boston University, a J.D. from the University of Notre Dame and an LL.M. from the London School of Economics and Political Science.

Phillips is founding partner of Phillips, Spallas & Angstadt LLP which is based in San Francisco and is a veteran of over 100 trials. He has numerous published appellate decisions.

== Published Appellate Decisions ==
- Creditors’ Collection Service v. Hanzell Vineyards, Ltd., 5Cal. App. 4th Supp. 1 (1992)
- State Farm Fire and Casualty Company v. Yu Kiyo, Ltd., etal., 870 Fed. Supp. 292 (1994)
- Edwards v. A.L. Lease & Co., (1st Dist., Div. 5) 46 Cal. App. 4th 1029 (1996)
- Wilson v. Wal-Mart Stores, Inc., 72 Cal. 2 App. 4th 382 (1999)
- Moore v. Wal-Mart Stores, Inc., 111 Cal. App. 4th 472 (2003)
- Sanchez v. Wal-Mart Stores, Inc. et al., 221 P.3d 1276 (2009)
- V&P Trading Co., Inc. v. United Charter LLC, CA 3rd C070571. (2012)
