= Jerzy W. Rozenblit =

Professor of Electrical and Computer Engineering

Dr. Jerzy W. Rozenblit
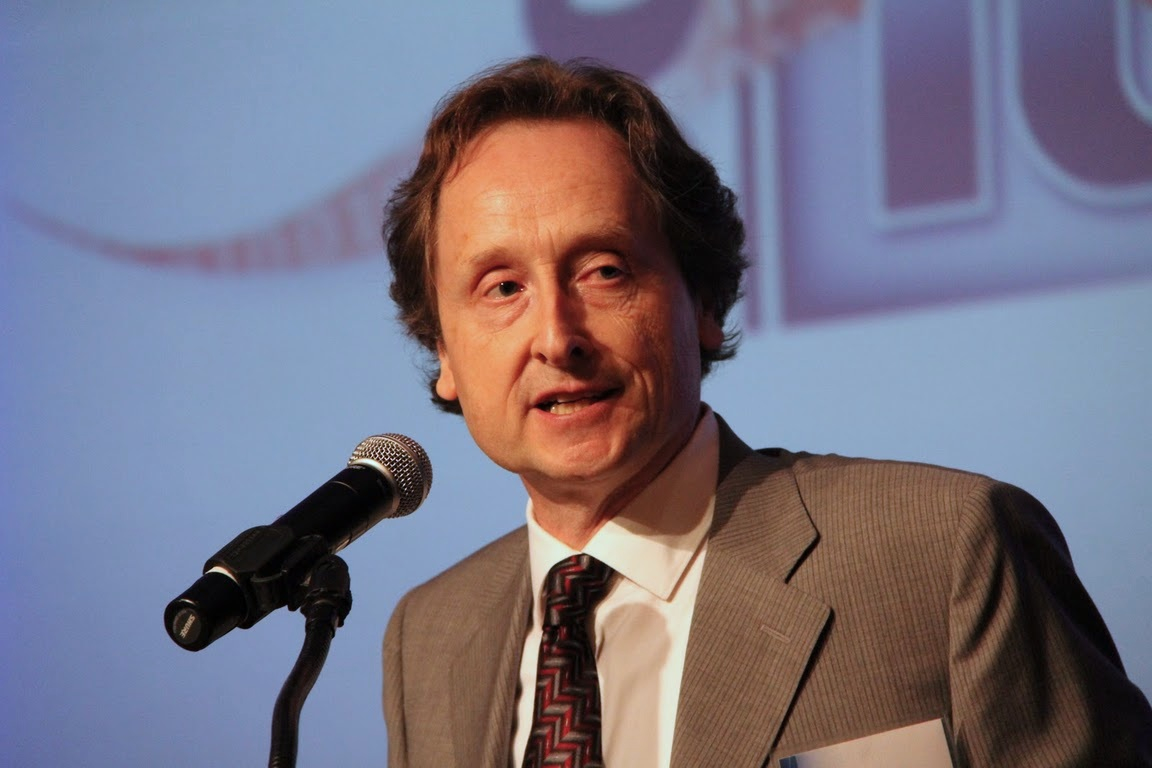
- Born: June 2, 1956, Poland
- Education: Wrocław University of Science and Technology, Poland Wayne State University, Detroit, Michigan
- Employer: The University of Arizona
- Title: University Distinguished Professor Raymond J Oglethorpe Endowed Chair Professor of Electrical and Computer Engineering

Jerzy W. Rozenblit is a University Distinguished Professor and Raymond J. Oglethorpe Endowed Chair in the Department of Electrical and Computer Engineering (ECE) at the University of Arizona, in Tucson, Arizona. He also holds a joint appointment as Professor of Surgery at the University of Arizona College of Medicine. From 2003 to 2011 he served as the ECE Department Head. During his tenure at the University of Arizona, he established the Model-Based Design Laboratory with major projects in complex systems design hardware software codesign, modeling, and computer-aided minimally-invasive surgical training. He presently serves as Director of the Life-Critical Computing Systems Initiative, a research enterprise intended to improve the reliability and safety of technology in life-critical applications.

== Background ==
Rozenblit grew up in Wrocław, Poland, and received his undergraduate degree summa cum laude from the Wrocław University of Science and Technology specializing in systems science and control engineering. He had spent time in the United Kingdom and the Netherlands prior to emigrating to Detroit, Michigan, where he completed his MSc and PhD in computer science at Wayne State University. In 1986, he joined the University of Arizona as a junior faculty, where he has worked ever since.

Rozenblit has been active in professional service in capacities ranging from editorship of Association for Computing Machinery, Institute of Electrical and Electronics Engineers, and Society for Computer Simulation Transactions, program and general chairmanship of major scientific conferences. Among several visiting assignments, he was a Fulbright Program Senior Scholar and visiting professor at the Institute of Systems Science at Johannes Kepler University of Linz, Austria, Research Fellow at the United States Army Research Laboratory, Visiting professor at the Technical University of Munich and University of Perugia. He served as a research scientist and visiting professor at Siemens AG and Infineon AG Central Research and Development Laboratories in Munich, where he was instrumental in the development of design frameworks for complex, computer-based systems.

== Accomplishments ==
Rozenblit is one of the founders of the area known as the engineering of computer-based systems (ECBS). His key contributions are seminal works in model-based design that established the theoretical basis of ECBS and bringing ECBS principles to practice in a number of significant engineering applications, namely VLSI design and manufacturing embedded systems design and testing, computer-assisted surgery (clinical medicine), and national security.

Specific technical innovations of his approach include the development of heuristics for design space search (a problem well known and proven to be NP-complete). The developed heuristics that use a rule-based approach to reduce the search complexity from exponential to polynomial and allow for rapid construction of simulatable design models.

Leveraging from his work in design and modeling. Rozenblit developed the model-based codesign approach that integrated hardware and software development paths, solving the "model continuity" problem by providing techniques to map formal specification onto executable design models. Rozenblit's recent work in design and engineering of systems for minimally invasive surgical training and computer-assisted surgery has strong societal implications, namely the improvement of patients' safety. He has developed the first ever system that improves the situational awareness in laparoscopic surgery using vision, sensor, and haptic-based guidance

In 2009, he was named University Distinguished Professor by the University of Arizona and its Arizona Board of Regents for exceptional contributions to research and undergraduate education.
